= Deputy governor of Kwara State =

Second highest-ranking official in the executive branch of Kwara State in Nigeria

Deputy Governor of Kwara State
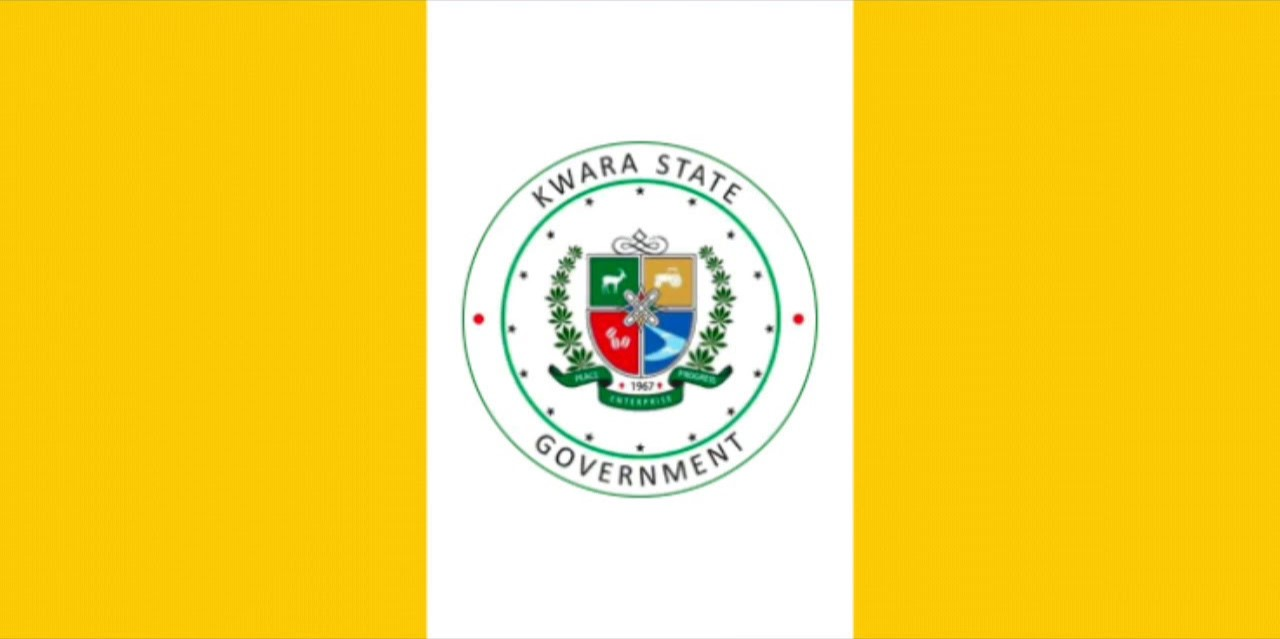
- Flag of Kwara State

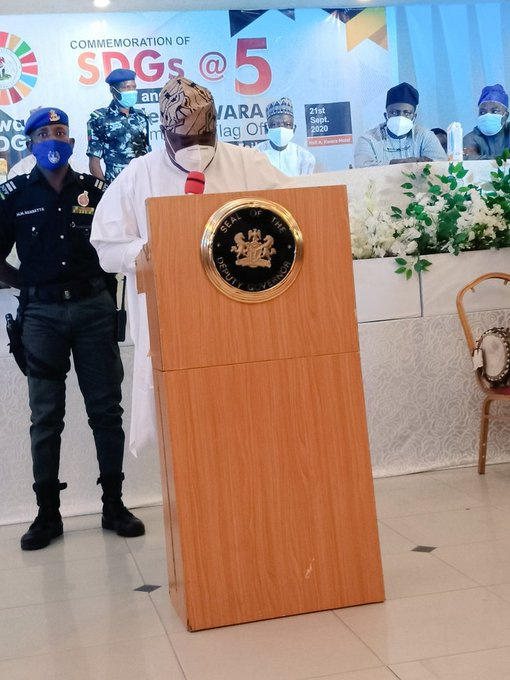
- Incumbent; Kayode Alabi since 29 May 2019
- Executive Branch of the Kwara State Government
- Style: Deputy Governor (informal); His Excellency (courtesy)
- Status: Second highest executive branch officer
- Member of: Kwara State Executive Branch; Kwara State Cabinet
- Residence: Deputy Governor's House
- Seat: Ahmadu Bello House
- Nominator: Gubernatorial candidate
- Appointer: Direct popular election or, if vacant, Governor via House of Assembly confirmation
- Term length: Four years, renewable once
- Constituting instrument: Constitution of Nigeria
- Inaugural holder: Josiah Adigun Adegoke (Second Republic)
- Succession: First
- Website: kwarastate.gov.ng

The deputy governor of Kwara State is the second-highest officer in the executive branch of the government of Kwara State, after the governor of Kwara State, and ranks first in line of succession. The deputy governor is directly elected together with the governor to a four-year term of office.

Kayode Alabi is the current deputy governor of Kwara State, he assumed office on 29 May 2019.

== Qualifications ==
As in the case of the Governor, in order to be qualified to be elected as Deputy Governor, a person must:

- be at least thirty-five (35) years of age;
- be a Nigerian citizen by birth;
- be a member of a political party with endorsement by that political party;
- have School Certificate or its equivalent.

== Responsibilities ==
The Deputy Governor assists the Governor in exercising primary assignments and is also eligible to replace a dead, impeached, absent or ill Governor as required by the 1999 Constitution of Nigeria.

== List of deputy governors ==
Name	Took office	Left office	Time in office	Party	Elected	Governor
Incumbent	7 years, 101 days	All Progressives Congress	2019; 2023	AbdulRahman AbdulRazaq		
