= Executive Council of Kwara State =

Executive arm of a state government in Nigeria

The Kwara State Executive Council (also known as the Cabinet of Kwara State) is the highest formal governmental body that plays important roles in the Government of Kwara State headed by the Governor of Kwara State. It consists of the Deputy Governor, Secretary to the State Government, Chief of Staff, Commissioners who preside over ministerial departments, and the Governor's special aides.

== Functions ==
The Executive Council exists to advise and direct the Governor. Their appointment as members of the Executive Council gives them the authority to execute power over their fields.

== Current cabinet ==
The current Executive Council is serving under the AbdulRahman AbdulRazaq administration.

=== Principal Officers ===
Office	Incumbent
Governor	AbdulRahman AbdulRazaq
Deputy Governor	Kayode Alabi
Secretary to the State Government	Mamman Saba Jibril
Acting Head of Service
Chief of Staff	
Deputy Chief of Staff	Princess Bukola Babalola
Senior Advisor and Counsellor	Sa'adu Salahudeen
Chief Press Secretary	Rafiu Ajakaye

=== Commissioners ===
In January 2021, AbdulRazaq dismissed all commissioners and ordered the outgoing appointees to hand over to the top civil service officer in their ministries. On 4 September 2023, Governor AbdulRahman AbdulRazaq formally inaugurated the members of his Cabinet for his second term in office.

On 25 February 2025, following a cabinet meeting, Governor AbdulRazaq announced the creation of two new ministries—the Ministry of Livestock Development and the Ministry of Transportation—to enhance governance and service delivery in these sectors. He subsequently forwarded the names of two commissioner nominees to the Kwara State House of Assembly for confirmation.

On 10 March 2025, the governor swore in the newly confirmed commissioners and announced a cabinet reshuffle to optimize governance.

Office	Incumbent
Commissioner for Agriculture and Rural Development	Dr. Afeez Abolore
Commissioner for Business, Innovation, and Technology	Damilola Yetunde Yusuf-Adelodun
Commissioner for Communications	Bola Olukoju
Commissioner for Education and Human Capital Development	Dr. Lawal Olohungbebe
Commissioner for Energy	Abdulazeez Kola Abdulganiy
Commissioner for Environment	Nafisat Buge
Commissioner for Finance	Dr. Hauwa Nuru
Commissioner for Health	Dr. Amina Ahmed El-Imam
Commissioner for Housing and Urban Development	Dr. Segun Ogunsola
Commissioner for Justice	Barr. Senior Ibrahim Sulyman
Commissioner for Livestock Development	Oloruntoyosi Adebayo Thomas
Commissioner for Local Government, Chieftaincy Affairs, and Community Development	Abubakar Abdullahi Bata
Commissioner for Planning and Economic Development	Dr. Mary Arinde
Commissioner for Social Development	Dr. Mariam Nnafatima-Imam
Commissioner for Solid Minerals Development	Abosede Olaitan Buraimoh
Commissioner for Special Duties	Bello John Olanrewaju
Commissioner for Tertiary Education	Sa'adatu Modibbo Kawu
Commissioner for Transportation	Aliyu Kora Sabi
Commissioner for Water Resources	Usman Yunusa Lade
Commissioner for Works	Abdulquawiy Olododo
Commissioner for Women Affairs	Opeyemi Afolashade
Commissioner for Youth Development	Shehu Ndanusa Usman

=== Special Advisers ===
==== Special Advisers ====
Office	Incumbent
Special Adviser, Legal Matters	Murtala Sambo
Special Adviser, Security Matters	Salihu Tunde Bello
Special Adviser, Media	Bashir Adigun
Special Adviser, Youth Engagement	Attahiru Umar Mohammed
Special Adviser, Strategy	Atiku Bahinda Abdulsalam
Special Adviser, Special Duties	Abdulrazaq Jiddah
Special Adviser, Education	Adetola Ariyike Salau
Special Adviser, Education Infrastructure	Mohammed Onikola Oyawoye
Special Adviser, Civic Engagement	Ummulkhairat Onaolamipo Ahmed Alaye
Special Adviser, Political	Abdulwahab Femi Agbaje Whyte
Special Adviser, Girl Child Empowerment	Joanna Kolo
Special Adviser, Legislative Affairs	Abdulgafar Ayilara
Special Adviser, Environment and Disaster Management	Remilekun Banigbe
Special Adviser, Party Affairs	Moshood Alaka
Special Adviser, Health Interventions	Dr. Raji Razaq
Special Adviser, Social Investments	Abubakar Saddiq Buhari

==== Senior Special Assistants ====
Office	Incumbent
Senior Special Assistant, Culture and Tourism	Muka Ray Eyiwumi
Senior Special Assistant, SDGs	
Senior Special Assistant, Community Development	
Senior Special Assistant, New Media	Fafoluyi Olayinka Michael
Senior Special Assistant, Media and Public Relations	Kolo Majin Isaiah
Senior Special Assistant, Herdsmen Community Outreach	Aishat Yusuf
Senior Special Assistant, Communications	Ibraheem Abdullateef
Senior Special Assistant, Geographical Information Service	Abdulmutalib Shittu
Senior Special Assistant, Women Mobilization	Lawal Abimbola Monsurat
Senior Special Assistant, Social Development	Mindadi Umar Ndagi
Senior Special Assistant, Grassroots Sensitisation	Isiaka Yakubu Agodi
Senior Special Assistant, Religion (Islam)	Ibrahim Danmaigoro
Senior Special Assistant, Religion (Christianity)	Reverend Timothy Akangbe

==== Special Assistants ====
Office	Incumbent
Special Assistant, Digital Innovations	Kayode Ishola

=== Permanent Secretaries ===
==== Permanent Secretaries for Ministerial Departments ====
Office	Incumbent
Permanent Secretary for Agriculture & Rural Development	Funke Sokoya
Permanent Secretary for Business, Innovation, and Technology	
Permanent Secretary for Education & Human Capital Development	Rebecca Bake
Permanent Secretary for Energy	Afolabi Olaitan
Permanent Secretary for Environment	Dr. Ayinla Abubakar Olayiwola
Permanent Secretary for Finance	Abdulrazaq Folorunsho
Permanent Secretary for Health	Taoheed Abdullahi Ayodeji
Permanent Secretary for Housing and Urban Development	Abdulazeez Tinuke Risikat
Permanent Secretary for Solid Minerals Development
Permanent Secretary for Justice	Barr. Sabitiyu Kikelomo Grillo
Permanent Secretary for Livestock Development	Yahaya Mohammed
Permanent Secretary for Local Government, Chieftaincy Affairs, and Community Development
Permanent Secretary for Planning and Economic Development	
Permanent Secretary for Social Development	
Permanent Secretary for Special Duties	
Permanent Secretary for Youth Development	
Permanent Secretary for Tertiary Education	
Permanent Secretary for Transportation	Salau Kabiru Abdullahi
Permanent Secretary for Water Resources	Omolola Christiana Asonibare
Permanent Secretary for Women Affairs
Permanent Secretary for Works	Abu Anthony Gana
Permanent Secretary for the Accountant General's Office	
Permanent Secretary for the State Auditor-General	
Permanent Secretary for the Local Government Auditor-General	

==== Permanent Secretaries for Extra-Ministerial Departments ====
Office	Incumbent
Permanent Secretary for Political Cabinet
Permanent Secretary for General Services	Abdulganiyu Yita
Permanent Secretary for Service Welfare	Olufunke Mercy Shittu
Permanent Secretary for the Civil Service Commission	Kafayat Jimoh
Permanent Secretary for the Teaching Service Commission	
Permanent Secretary for State Universal Basic Education	
Permanent Secretary for the Local Government Service Commission	
Permanent Secretary for the Government House	
Clerk of the Kwara State House of Assembly	
Permanent Secretary for the Bureau of Statistics	
Permanent Secretary for the Kwara Liaison Office, Abuja
