= Abdulganiyu =

Abdulganiyu can be a masculine given name or a middle name. Notable people with the name include:

== Given name ==
- Abdulganiyu Abdulrasaq, Nigerian civil servant and lawyer
- Abdulganiyu Audu, Nigerian politician
- Abdulganiyu Saka Cook Olododo, Nigerian politician

== Middle name ==
- Abdulquawiy Abdulganiyu Olododo, Nigerian politician, entrepreneur, and engineer
