= Tajul Adab =

Nigerian Islamic scholar, Sufi and educational reformer (1877–1922)

- تاج الأدب
- Born: Muhammad Juma Alabi; 1877; Ilorin, Kwara State, Nigeria
- Died: 1922 (aged 44–45); Nigeria
- Occupations: Islamic scholar, preacher, poet and educator
- Known for: Al-Zumra al-Adabiyya movement

Shaykh Tajul Adab (born Muhammad Juma Alabi; c. 1877 – 1922) was an Islamic scholar, Sufi, preacher, and educational reformer from Ilorin, Nigeria. He is widely recognized as one of the pioneer scholars in Yorubaland to introduce structured syllabi, prescribed textbooks, and formal timetables to modern Arabic education, and was the founder of the Al-Zumra al-Adabiyya movement.

== Lineage and Early Life ==
Tajul Adab was born in 1877 into a scholarly and religious family in the Masingba (Okekere) quarters of Ilorin, Kwara State. His father, Abd al-Qadir bin Salih bin Ali bin Yusuf al-Malawi, was a prominent Islamic scholar and deputy Imam of the (Fulani) community in Ilorin, whose ancestral lineage traced back from Mali through Sokoto during the movement of Usman dan Fodio to Oyo and Ilorin. His mother, Khadijah, was the daughter of Salih, the second Galadima of Ilorin in the Galadima Gegele quarter.

Tajul Adab began his early Arabic and Qur'anic education under the tutelage of his father. Accounts regarding his formal higher mentorship vary among local historians; according to scholar Dr. Muhammad Kamalud-deen Habibullah al-Adabi, Tajul Adab had no recorded physical teacher and was said to have received spiritual instruction from Shaykh Abd al-Qadir al-Jilani through dreams a claim that drew opposition from some contemporary scholars in Ilorin at the time. He later embarked on extensive study travels across Southwestern Nigeria, establishing a reputation for profound spiritual devotion and expertise in Arabic literature and Islamic jurisprudence.

== Spiritual Path and Educational Reforms ==
Tajul Adab was affiliated with the Qadiriyya Sufi order, establishing a distinct branch known as the Qadiriyya Adabiyya. He adopted the title "Tajul Adab" (Crown of Manners), reflecting his primary educational philosophy that character and manners precede intellectual knowledge (al-Adab fawq al-'Ilm).

Upon establishing his movement, Al-Zumra al-Adabiyya, Tajul Adab introduced systemic reforms to traditional Arabic education in Yorubaland, including:

- The introduction of formal lesson plans, standardized curricula, and fixed timetables.
- The use of blackboards, chalk, and printed textbooks for teaching Arabic.
- Public preaching tours across cities such as Abeokuta, Ibadan, and Iwo.

His reforms profoundly shaped modern Islamic scholarship in Southwestern Nigeria, directly influencing key figures such as Shaykh Muhammad Kamalud-Deen Al-Adaby, founder of the Ansarul Islam Society of Nigeria.

== Literary Works ==
Tajul Adab authored over fifty works in Arabic prose and poetry spanning morphology, grammar, ethics, and supplications. Among his surviving works are:

- Durar al-Murjan A 290 verse poem on Arabic morphology (Sarf).
- Mirqat al-Manabir A 53 verse didactic poem on Arabic grammar (Nahw), composed in Ogbondoroko near Ilorin.
- Kitab al-Shagrab (also known as ‘Addid) A 55 verse treatise on Arabic literature and rhetoric.
- Tali'at al-Da'wah al-Mustajabah An 87 verse devotional poem of supplications.

== Personal Life and Disciples ==
Tajul Adab was married to four wives: Mangu Ayiluko of Masingba (married in 1902), Salamah of Pakata, Zaynab of Omoda, and Inna Ko (Iya Isale Gambari) of Ojagboro.

Through his teaching movement, he graduated two major cohorts of students upon whom he bestowed scholarly titles. Prominent direct disciples included:

- Shaykh Muhammad Tukur (bestowed the title Kamal al-Din)
- Shaykh Zakariyya "Baba Kini" (bestowed the title Taj al-Mu'minin)
- Shaykh Yahya Adafila of Okene (bestowed the title Taj al-Din)
- Shaykh Muhammad al-Muzammil of Abeokuta (bestowed the title Taj al-'Arifin)
- Shaykh Salman Ake of Abeokuta (bestowed the title Mufti al-Din)
- Shaykh Aqib of Iwo (bestowed the title Sadr al-Din)
- Shaykh Abdul Rauf of Lagos (bestowed the title Husam al-Din)

Other notable disciples who studied under his guidance included:

- Alhaji Junaid (Abeokuta)
- Alhaji Hassan (Abeokuta)
- Alfa Amin Owolojobi (Ede)
- Imam Sanusi Ibrahim (Ode-Omu)
- Alhaji Muslim (Oke Gege, Abeokuta)
- Alhaji Bushra Yusuf (Ede)
- Muhammad al-Jami (Ilobu)
- Alfa Makola
- Shaykh Sharif (Ode Adana)
- Baba Nile Ami (Iwo)

== Death and Legacy ==
Tajul Adab passed away on the night of November 19, 1922 (30 Rabi' al-Awwal 1341 AH) during a preaching visit to Abeokuta, Ogun State. He was interred adjacent to the Ake Mosque in Abeokuta, where his tomb remains a notable landmark. His educational framework continues to serve as the foundation for modern Arabic colleges across Southwestern Nigeria.
