= Adenike Harriet Afolabi-Oshatimehin =

Nigerian politician and Kwara State commissioner

Commissioner for Solid Minerals Development Kwara State
- Incumbent
- Assumed office 2022
- Governor: AbdulRahman AbdulRazaq

Commissioner for Youth Development Kwara State
- Governor: AbdulRahman AbdulRazaq

Commissioner for Communications Kwara State
- Incumbent
- Assumed office 2019
- Governor: AbdulRahman AbdulRazaq

Personal details
- Born: Okeayo/Ora, Ifelodun Local Government Area, Kwara State, Nigeria
- Party: All Progressives Congress
- Education: University of Ilorin; Kwara State Polytechnic; Abadina College, University of Ibadan
- Occupation: Politician; Public administrator

Adenike Harriet Afolabi-Oshatimehin is a Nigerian public administrator and politician from Kwara State. She has served in various positions, as a commissioner in the Kwara State Executive Council, including Commissioner for Communications, Commissioner for Youth Development, and Commissioner for Solid Minerals Development. She is also a party member of the All Progressives Congress (APC).

== Early life and education ==
Afolabi-Oshatimehin is from Okeayo Ora Community in Ifelodun, LGA, Kwara State, Nigeria. She went to Abadina College, University of Ibadan, before leaving to Kwara State Polytechnic and later obtained a degree in economics from the University of Ilorin.

== Political career ==
Afolabi-Oshatimehin served under the leadership of His Excellency, Governor AbdulRahman AbdulRazaq in 2019 as a commissioner in the Kwara State Executive Council. Thereafter, her appointment was approved by the Kwara State House of Assembly.

Her political portfolio includes:

- Commissioner of Communication.
- Commissioner for Youths and Sports.
- Commissioner for Solid Minerals Development.
