= Sa'adatu Modibbo Kawu =

Nigerian politician

- Born: Sa’adatu Gobir; Nigeria
- Education: Usmanu Danfodiyo University Sokoto; University of Ilorin
- Occupation: Politician
- Office: Commissioner for Education and Human Capital Development, Kwara State
- Spouse: Ishaq Modibbo-Kawu

Hajia Sa'adatu Modibbo Kawu is a Nigerian politician currently serving as the Commissioner for Tertiary Education in Kwara State.

She previously served as the Commissioner for Education and Human Capital Development and was the Commissioner for Tertiary Education, Science, and Technology during the first tenure of Governor AbdulRahman AbdulRazaq (CON).

== Early life and education ==
In 1997, she studied economics at Usmanu Danfodiyo University Sokoto and then obtained a Masters in Business Administration from the University of Ilorin, Ilorin.

== Career ==
As Commissioner for Tertiary Education, Science, and Technology, 1.592 billion Naira was spent to clear the arrears of salaries to transform education in the State.

She has held significant positions such as Head Human resources and Lead Facilitator at organizations including Kinder Comfort Learning Centre, SOG Management Consultants and WSV Multimedia Limited between 2003 and 2012. Her experience also includes roles at Zenith Bank branches in Kaduna, Ilorin and Maiduguri from 2001 to 2003, and a stint at the Ministry of Finance in Kaduna from 1998 to 1999.

Beyond her professional roles, Sa’adatu has actively participated in various committees and initiatives, underscoring her dedication to societal welfare. Notably, she was a member of the former president Yar’Adua Campaign Organization in 2007 and chaired the Rainstorm Disaster Assessment Committee in Kwara State in September 2020.

== Personal life ==
She is married to the ex-director-general of the National Broadcasting Commission, Is'haq Modibbo Kawu. She has 5 children.

== See also ==
- AbdulRahman AbdulRazaq
- Bolanle Olukoju
- Kwara State Executive Council
