= Kwasu Library =

Largest Academic Library in Nigeria

Muhammadu Buhari Library
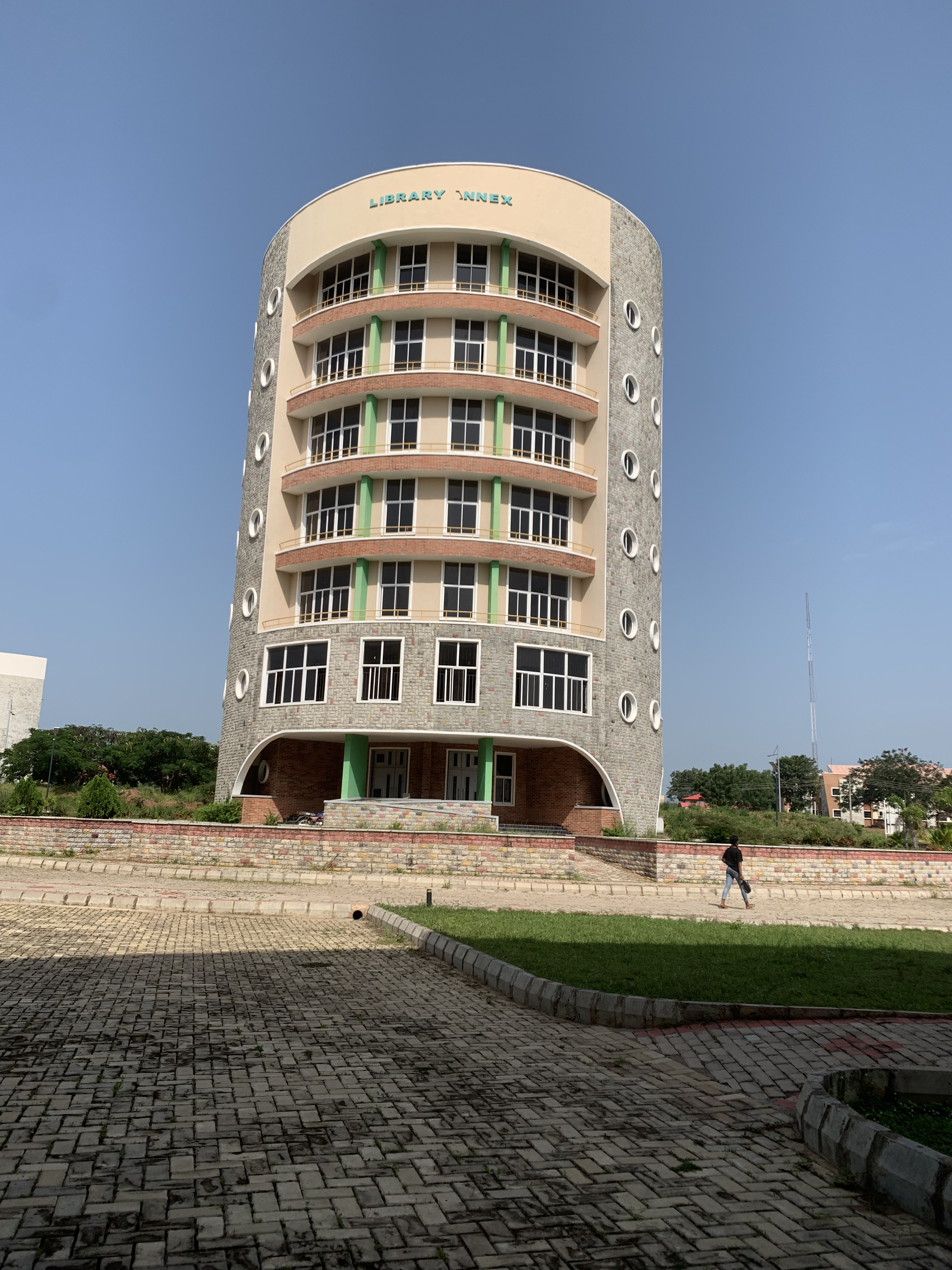
- An image of Muhammadu Buhari Library
- 8.721870788267076°N 4.483732010984788°E
- Location: Malete, Kwara State, Nigeria
- Type: academic library
- Established: 2009

Other information
- Affiliation: Kwara State University

Kwasu Library is the main library for Kwara State University. It was established in 2009 to meet the learning purposes of KWASU. It comprises two buildings, a three-storey main library and a six-storey library annex.

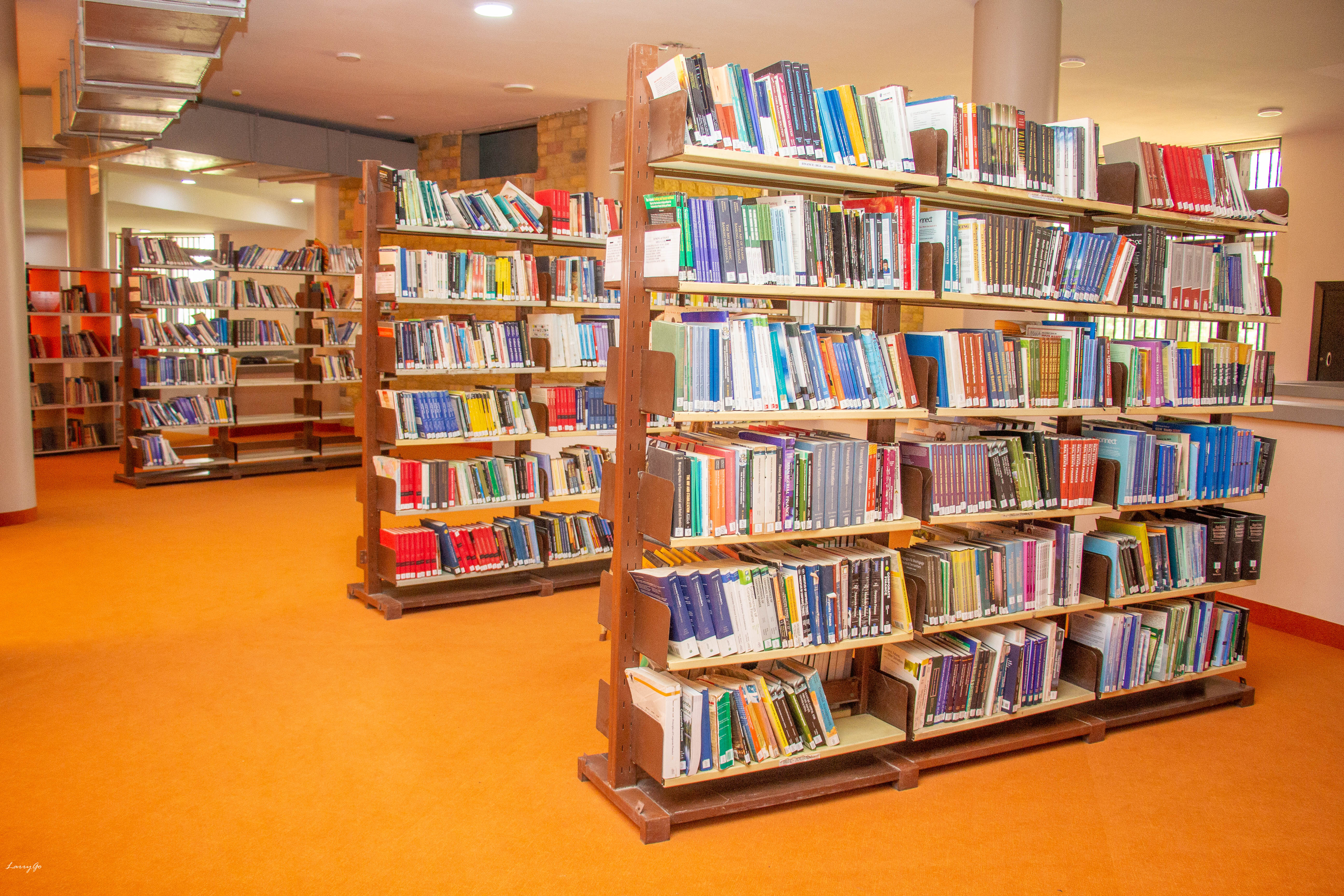
Books on the shelf at the Kwara State University Library

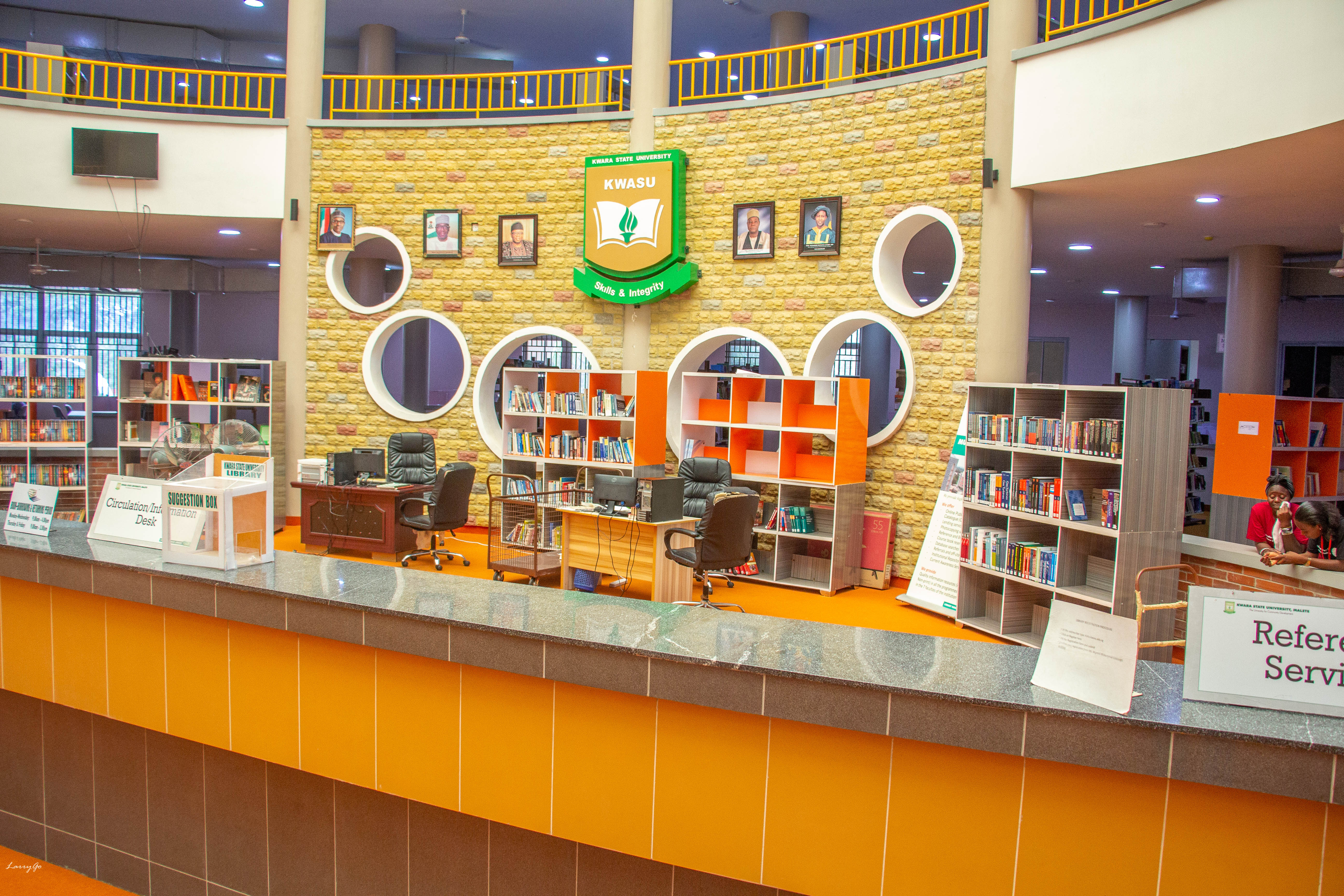
The Circulation desk of the Kwara State University Library

== History ==
The institution's library was established in 2009. It was set up in the Faculty of Pure & Applied Science before the building was moved to the Faculty of Agriculture with the virtual library brought about in 2012. The main library is at Malete, a reading section at Oke Osi and Ilesha-baruba. The library building was opened to the public in 2020 after it was commissioned and named after President Muhammad Buhari on July 6, 2019. The structure is located in the Kwara State University campus in Malete.

== See also ==
- Kwasu FM
- List of libraries in Nigeria
