= Olukoju =

Olukoju is a surname. Notable people with the surname include:

- Adewale Olukoju (born 1968), Nigerian athlete
- Ayodeji Olukoju (born 1959), Nigerian professor
- Bolanle Olukoju (fl. 2023), Nigerian public relations expert, community organiser, and administrator
- Fatima Yusuf-Olukoju (born 1971), Nigerian athlete
