= Abdul Rasheed Na'Allah =

Nigerian academic and educator (born 1962)

Vice-Chancellor of the University of Abuja
- In office July 2019 – June 30, 2024
- Preceded by: Michael Umale Adikwu
- Succeeded by: Aisha Maikudi

Vice-Chancellor of Kwara State University
- In office 2009–2019
- Preceded by: Founding VC
- Succeeded by: Professor Mohammed Mustapha Akanbi

Personal details
- Born: 1962 (age 63–64) Nigeria
- Education: University of Ilorin; University of Alberta
- Occupation: Academic, Professor and writer

Abdul Rasheed Na'Allah (born 1962) is a Nigerian academic, educator and professor who served as the 6th Vice chancellor of University of Abuja from 2019 until June 2024. Prior to this, he was the Vice chancellor of Kwara State University from 2009 to 2019 before he was appointed as Vice chancellor of University of Abuja. He was succeeded by Professor Aisha Maikudi.

== Biography ==
He received a BA in 1988 from University of Ilorin, with a thesis "Dadakuada: the trends in the development of Ilorin traditional oral poetry", subsequently published in African Notes., and in 1992 received a M.A. Literature in English from the same university. In 1999, he received his PhD in Comparative Literature from the University of Alberta, Edmonton, Canada, and was subsequently professor and chair of African-American Studies at Western Illinois University. He later served as the pioneer Vice-Chancellor of Kwara State University in Nigeria and subsequently as the 6th substantive Vice-Chancellor and Chief Executive of the University of Abuja, located in Nigeria's capital city, a position he held until June 30, 2024.

He is the author and co-author of numerous books, but most books of his that are most recent are Yoruba Oral Tradition in Islamic Nigeria: A History of Dadakuada (Routledge, 2019), Globalization, Oral Performance, and African Traditional Poetry (Palgrave Macmillan, March 2018), African Discourse in Islam, Oral Traditions, and Performance (Routledge, 2010) and Africanity, Islamicity, and Performativity: Identity in the House of Ilorin (Bayreuth African Studies, 2009), and edited a poetry book, Obama-Mentum: An Anthology of Transformational Poetry.. Dr. Abdul-Rasheed Na'Allah's other books, include: coauthor with Ladan Sulaiman and Ahmad Sambo, Functional Literacy Primer in Hausa, sponsored by the European Economic Commission and Federal Government of Nigeria, 1992; coauthor, Instructors' Guide to Functional Literacy Primer in Hausa, 1992; coauthor with Bayo Ogunjimi, Introduction to African Oral Literature (Oral Prose), University of Ilorin Press, 1991; author, Introduction to African Oral Literature (1994); and Editor, Ogoni's Agonies: Ken Saro-Wiwa and the Crisis in Nigeria (Africa World Press, 1998)

Dr. Na'Allah has been nominated for and received numerous honors and awards, including The Nelson Mandela Distinguished Africanist award, June 2024, and 2018, Exemplary Leadership in Higher Education in Africa Award, by GUNi-Africa, 2017's Hero and Icon of Good Leadership award, by National Association of Nigerian Students (NANS), Joint Campus Committee, Kwara State; in 2016, African Patriot Award, by Commonwealth Youth Council; 2015, Inducted into the Member, WASU Hall of Fame, as Kwame Nrumah Leadership Award, by West African Students Union, WASU; also awarded Fellow, Association of Nigerian Authors, 2023, Fellow of the Nigeria Academy of Letters, 2019, and Fellow, the Literary Society of Nigeria, in March, 2014; also in 2014, given Meritorious Award as Notable Academician, by Rotaract Zone JD9125, Nigeria Rotary International; in 2013, decorated with the Leading Light Award, by the University of Ilorin Alumni Association, National; awarded in November 2013, the Award of Recognition of Sterling Achievements/Outstanding Contributions, by the Unilorin Alumni Association, Abuja Chapter; in 2012, given the Meritorious Award, by the Ilorin Emirate Students Union; also in 2012, decorated with the Honorary Membership and Merit Award, by the Man ‘O’ War Nigeria; in 2009, he received the Cathy O’Neill Couza Award for Outstanding Leadership in Diversity, Western Illinois University (WIU), USA; also in 2009, he was awarded the WIU’s Administrative Achievement Award 2008-2009 for achievements as Department Chair by Western Illinois University, USA; also in 2008, he was presented both Western Illinois University Certificate of Recognition, and Inducted into The Honor Society of Phi Kappa Phi Membership, USA; he received the Gold Key Recognition Award, University of Alberta Student Union, in 1998; the Graduate Student Service Award, GSA, University of Alberta; The Alberta Heritage Charles S Noble Award for Student Leadership, in 1998 by the province of Alberta, Canada; and the Black Achievements Award, Post-Secondary—Scholastic, 1998, by the Black Achievement Awards Society of Alberta.

He wrote the article on Kwame Anthony Appiah for The Oxford Encyclopedia of African Thought He was the Vice-Chancellor of Kwara State University from 2015 to 2019 and subsequently served as the Vice-Chancellor of the University of Abuja from July 2019 to June 30, 2024.

== Publications ==
=== Books ===
- NaʼAllah, Abdul Rasheed. Yoruba Oral Tradition in Islamic Nigeria: A History of Dàdàkúàdá. New York: Routledge, 2020.
- NaʼAllah, Abdul Rasheed. Cultural Globalization and Plurality: Africa and the New World. Trenton, NJ: Africa World Press, 2011.
- NaʼAllah, Abdul Rasheed. African Discourse in Islam, Oral Traditions, and Performance. New York: Routledge, 2010. ISBN 0203863585.
  - Reviewed by Robert Cancel in African Studies Review, vol. 50, no. 1 (April 2007): 211–213.
  - Reviewed by Beverly B. Mack in Research in African Literatures, vol. 42, no. 1 (2011): 185.
- Ogunjimi, Bayo, and NaʼAllah, Abdul Rasheed. Introduction to African Oral Literature and Performance. Trenton, NJ: Africa World Press, 2005.
  - Reviewed by Robert Cancel in African Studies Review, vol. 50, no. 1 (2007): 211.
- NaʼAllah, Abdul Rasheed. Ahmadu Fulani: An African Poetry. Trenton, NJ: Africa World Press, 2004.
- NaʼAllah, Abdul Rasheed, and Osundare, Niyi. The People's Poet: Emerging Perspectives on Niyi Osundare. Trenton, NJ: Africa World Press, 2003.
  - Reviewed by Fidelis Odun Balogun in Research in African Literatures, vol. 35, no. 4 (2004): 186–188.
- NaʼAllah, Abdul Rasheed. Almajiri: A New African Poetry. Trenton, NJ: Africa World Press, 2001.
- NaʼAllah, Abdul Rasheed. Ogoni's Agonies: Ken Saro-Wiwa and the Crisis in Nigeria. Trenton, NJ: Africa World Press, 1998. ISBN 9780865436473.
