= Lawal Olohungbebe =

Nigerian politician and lecturer

Honourable Lawal Olohungbebe

Commissioner for Education and Human Capital Development
- Incumbent
- Assumed office March 2025

Personal details
- Born: Ilorin, Kwara State, Nigeria
- Party: All Progressives Congress (APC)
- Occupation: Lecturer, politician

Lawal Olalekan Olohungbebe is a Nigerian politician and lecturer at Kwara State University. He held position as the Senior Special Assistant to the Kwara State Governor on Community Development until his appointment as the Commissioner for Education and Human Capital Development by Governor Abdulrahman Abdulrazaq.

== Early life and education ==
Olohungbebe holds doctorate degree from Bayero University, Kano (BUK), obtained masters degree in community development from Ladoke Akintola University, Ogbomosho and obtained his bachelor's degree in Sociology and Anthropology from the University of Maiduguri, Borno State.

== Career ==
Olohungbebe was primarily a lecturer at the Kwara State University, Malete before his appointment as the Senior Special Assistant to Governor Abdulrahman Abdulrazaq on community developmenton 3 December 2023. On 10 March 2025, After a cabinet reshuffling by Governor Abdulrahman Abdulrazaq, Dr. Olohungbebe was appointed as the Commissioner of Education and Human Capital Development in Kwara state.

On 10 December 2025, he became the chairman of the Nigerian Education Commissioners, being the face and representative of other education commissioners across the states of the country at the federal level working alongside the Minister of Education, Tunji Alausa.
