= Abdulquawiy Abdulganiyu Olododo =

Nigerian Politician

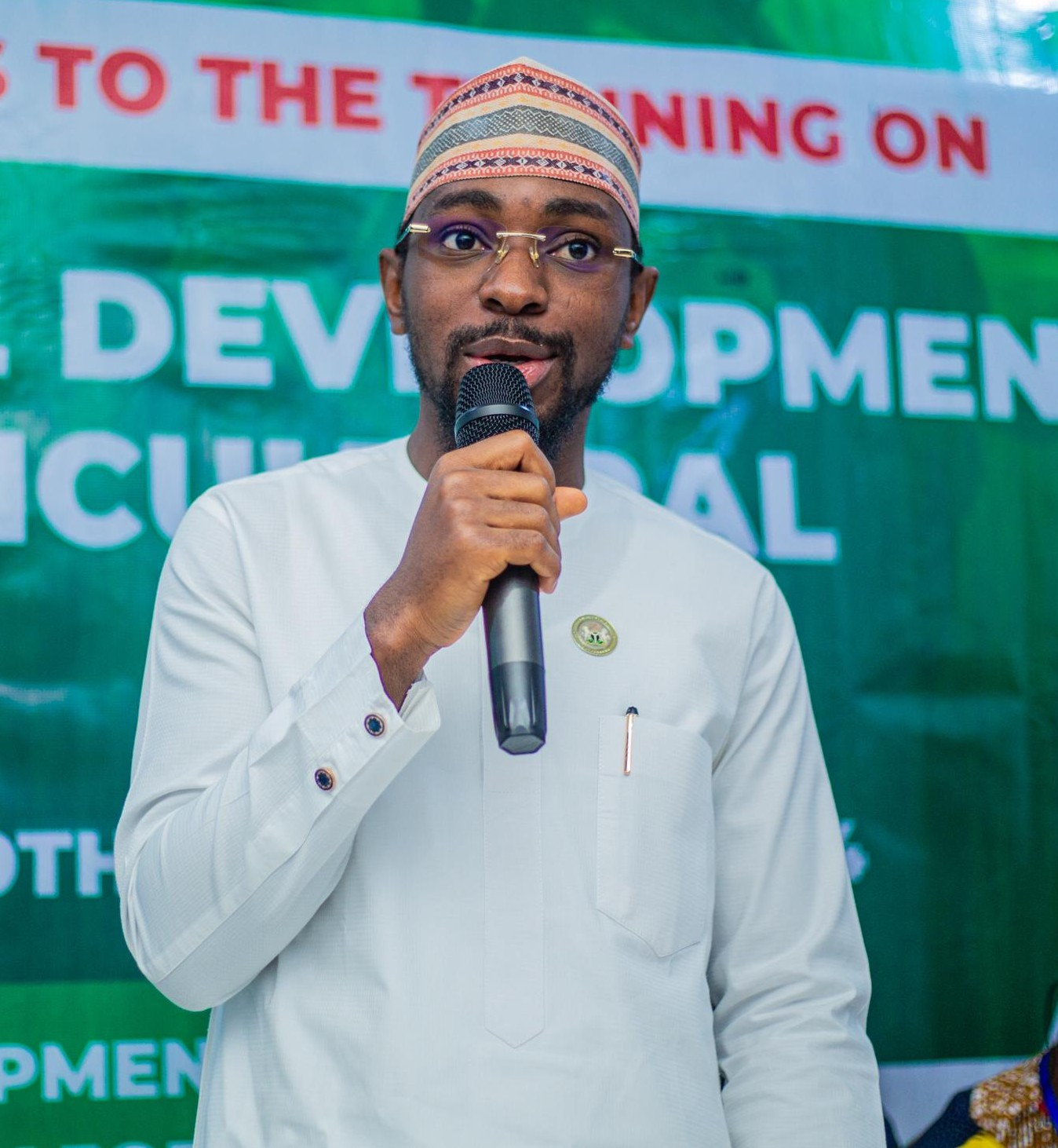
- Olododo during a presentation

Kwara State Commissioner for Works
- Incumbent
- Assumed office April 2024

Kwara State Commissioner for Solid Minerals Development
- In office September 2023 – April 2024

Acting Kwara State Commissioner for Works and Transport
- In office October 2023 – April 2024

General Manager, Kwara State Social Investment Programme (KWASSIP)
- In office July 2022 – May 2023

Technical Assistant on Agriculture to Governor AbdulRahman AbdulRazaq
- In office April 2020 – June 2022

Personal details
- Born: Abdulquawiy Abdulganiyu Olododo
- Citizenship: Nigeria
- Party: All Progressives Congress
- Education: Kwara State University
- Occupation: Politician; Entrepreneur; Engineer

Abdulquawiy Abdulganiyu Olododo is a Nigerian politician, entrepreneur, and engineer. He is a former Commissioner for Works in Kwara State and the All Progressives Congress (APC) candidate for the Ilorin East/Ilorin South Federal Constituency in the 2027 Nigerian House of Representatives election.

Olododo is from Ilorin East, Ilorin, and graduated from Kwara State University.

== Career ==
Olododo was the General Manager of the Kwara State Social Investment Programme (KWASSIP) between July 2022 to August 2023. He was the Technical Assistant on Agriculture to the Governor AbdulRahman AbdulRazaq between 2020 and 2022. In 2023, he was the Commissioner for Solid Minerals Development and the Supervising Commissioner for Works and Transport in Kwara State, Nigeria.

=== Commissioner for Works and Transport, Kwara State ===
Early 2024, Abdulquawiy Olododo was appointed as the Commissioner for Works and Transport in Kwara State by Governor AbdulRahman AbdulRazaq. This appointment followed a cabinet reshuffle where Olododo, who had been serving as the Commissioner for Solid Minerals, took on the role of Commissioner for Works and Transport. Prior to this, he had held the Works and Transport portfolio in an acting capacity while simultaneously overseeing the Ministry of Solid Minerals.

Following a restructuring by the Kwara State Executive Council in February 2025, the Ministry of Works and Transport was split into two separate ministries—the Ministry of Works and the newly established Ministry of Transportation. With this change, in 2025, Olododo served as the Commissioner for Works, while a separate Commissioner is expected to oversee the Ministry of Transportation.

In 2026, Olododo won the All Progressives Congress (APC) primary election to contest the Ilorin East/Ilorin South Federal Constituency seat in the 2027 Nigerian House of Representatives election.
