= Kwara State Ministry of Health =

Ministry in Kwara State, Nigeria

Osun State Ministry of Education

Ministry overview
- Jurisdiction: Government of Osun State
- Headquarters: State Government Secretariat
- Ministry executive: Hon. Amina Ahmed El-Imam, Commissioner
- Website: https://www.kwarastate.gov.ng/

The Kwara State Ministry of Health oversees the development and implementation of health policies and programs in Kwara State, Nigeria. The Ministry is responsible for coordinating, supervising, and regulating various activities in the health sector to deliver quality healthcare services to citizens. In November 2017 with the approval of the Kwara State House of Assembly, the Ministry helped create the Kwara State Health Insurance Scheme (KWSHIS), established by the state government to improve citizens' access to healthcare at a minimal cost. The scheme aims to make healthcare management and insurance more accessible to the people of Osun State. Amina Ahmed El-Imam is currently serving as the Commissioner for Health in the Kwara State.

== See also ==
- List of governors of Kwara State
- Ikirun College of Health Technology
- Kwara State University
- Osun Health Insurance Scheme
