= Kwasu FM =

Radio station in Ilorin, Nigeria

Malete; Nigeria
- Broadcast area: Kwara State
- Frequency: 103.9 MHz

Programming
- Languages: English and Yoruba
- Format: Local news, international news, educational talk, sports, politics and music

Ownership
- Owner: Kwara State University

History
- First air date: 2016

Links
- Website: Kwasu FM Online

Kwasu Radio is an indigenous radio station operated by the Kwara State University, Malete, in Kwara State, Nigeria. The radio station operates on the 103.9 MHz frequency. The radio station started operations on 20th of March 2019. Aside the radio station for the institution, a television station has been proposed since 2014 by the Vice-Chancellor of the institution, Professor AbdulRasheed Na'Allah.
