= Hawau Nuru =

Nigerian politician

Hauwa Nuru

Commissioner for Finance, Kwara State
- Incumbent
- Assumed office 2023
- Governor: AbdulRahman AbdulRazaq

Personal details
- Education: MBA, DBA
- Occupation: Financial expert, public administrator, politician

Hauwa Nuru (also spelled Hawau Nuru) is a Nigerian financial expert, public administrator, and politician who serves as the Commissioner for Finance in Kwara State, Nigeria.

She has over three decades of experience in finance, taxation, and public sector management across both private and public institutions.

== Early life and education ==
Hauwa Nuru holds a Master of Business Administration (MBA) in Banking and Finance and a Doctor of Business Administration (DBA) with a specialization in leadership. She has also attended executive training programmes at institutions including Harvard Business School and Manchester Business School.

== Career ==
Nuru has over 30 years of professional experience in banking, finance, taxation, and public administration. She served as Chief Financial Officer (General Manager, Finance) at Eko Electricity Distribution Company, where she managed financial operations and contributed to institutional reforms.

She has also held board positions in various organisations across different sectors including finance, energy, and agribusiness.

== Political career ==
In 2023, she was appointed Commissioner for Finance in Kwara State by Governor AbdulRahman AbdulRazaq.

As commissioner, she has played a role in strengthening fiscal policies, improving revenue administration, and promoting transparency in public finance.

She has also been involved in various policy decisions relating to workers' registration, pension administration, and financial governance in the state.

== Honours and recognition ==
Nuru has received recognition for her contributions to public financial management and taxation, including an award from the Society of Women in Taxation (SWIT) for her role in advancing tax administration and promoting female leadership.
