= Office of the Governor of Kwara State =

Head of government of Kwara State in Nigeria

Governor of Kwara State
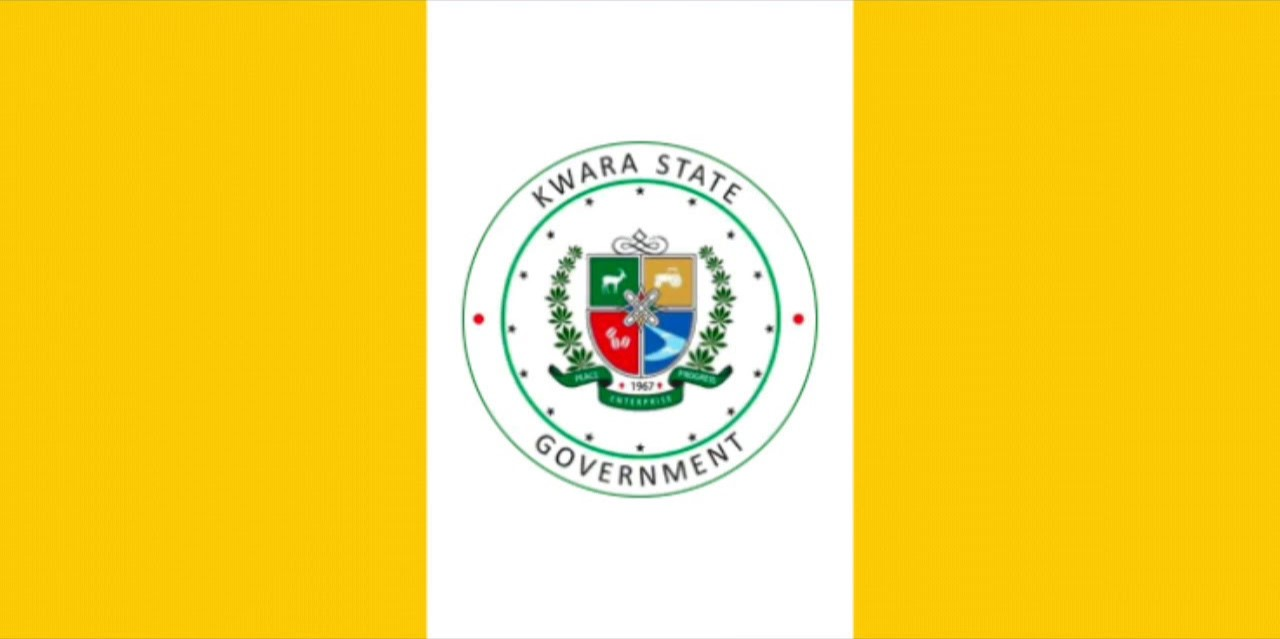
- Flag of Kwara State

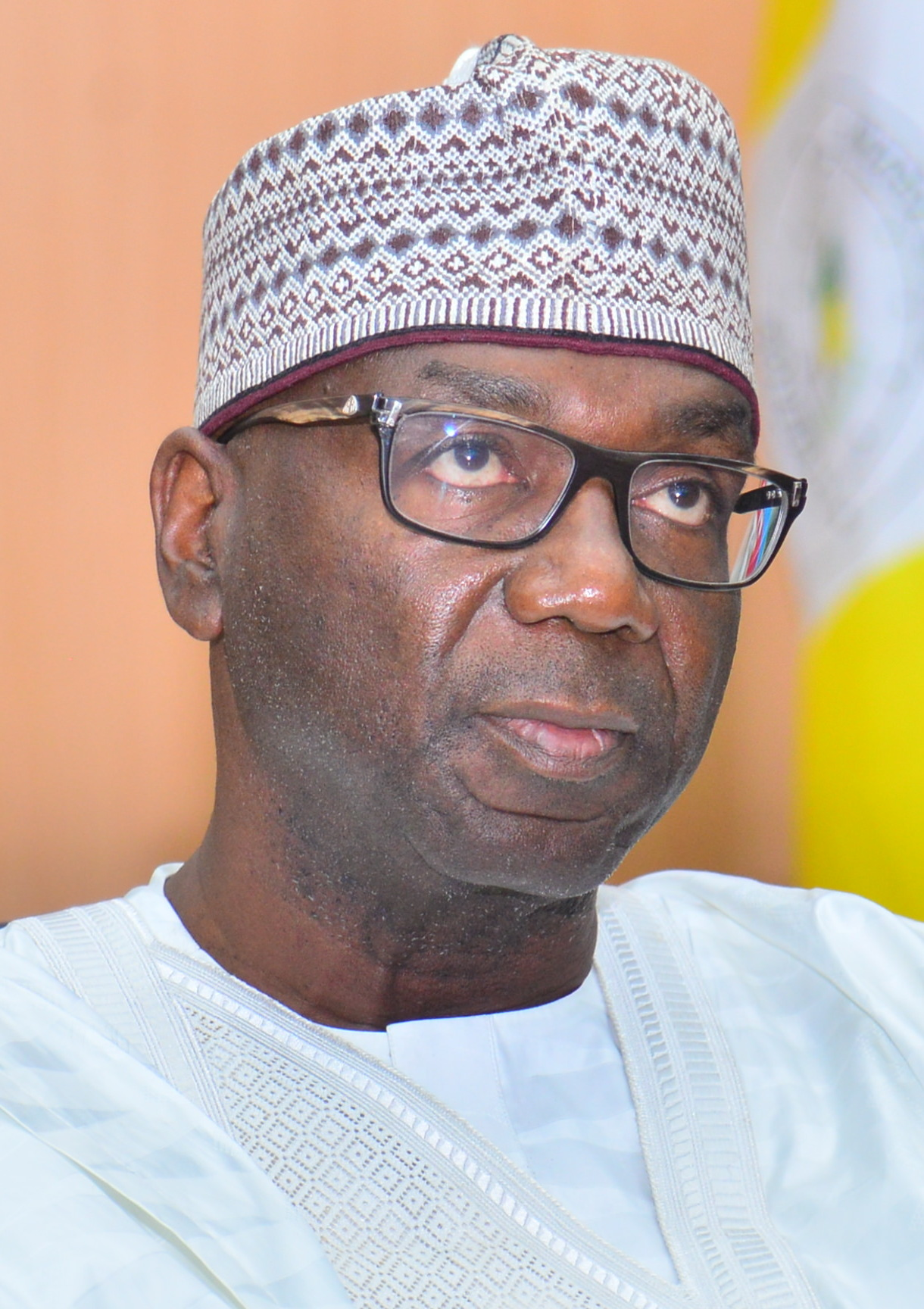
- Incumbent; AbdulRahman AbdulRazaq since 29 May 2019
- Executive Branch of the Kwara State Government
- Style: His Excellency
- Type: Head of state; Head of government
- Member of: Kwara State Executive Council
- Residence: Kwara House
- Seat: Ilorin
- Appointer: Direct popular election or via succession from deputy governorship
- Term length: Four years renewable once
- Constituting instrument: Constitution of Nigeria
- Formation: 27 May 1967 (59 years ago)
- First holder: David Bamigboye
- Deputy: Deputy Governor of Kwara State

The governor of Kwara State is the head of government of Kwara State in Nigeria. The governor heads the executive branch of the Kwara State Government. This position places its holder in leadership of the state with command authority over the state activities and affairs. The Governor is described to be the number one citizen of the state. According to Article II of the Constitution of Federal Republic of Nigeria vests the executive power of the state in the governor and charges him with the execution of state law, alongside the responsibility of appointing state executive, diplomatic, regulatory, and judicial officers subject to the approval of the Assembly members.

== Powers and duties ==
=== Legislative role ===
The main source of power of the governor is the Constitution that confers the veto power upon the governor. The Presentment Clause requires any bill passed by the Kwara State House of Assembly to be presented to the governor before it can become law. Once the legislation has been presented, the governor has three options:

1. Sign the legislation; the bill then becomes law.
2. Veto the legislation and return it to the state house of assembly expressing any objections; the bill does not become law, unless the member of the house votes to override the veto by a two-thirds vote.

=== Administrative powers ===
The Kwara State Governor is the sole repository of the executive powers of the State, and the powers entrusted to him as well as the duties imposed upon him are awesome indeed. The governor is the head of the executive branch of the state government and is constitutionally obligated to "take care that the laws be faithfully executed." The governor makes numerous executive branch appointments: commissioners and other state officers, are all appointed by the governor with subject to the approval of the state assembly. The power of the governor to sack executive officials has long been a contentious political issue. Generally, the governor may remove purely executive officials at his discretion. However, the assembly can curtail and constrain a governor's authority to sack commissioners of independent regulatory agencies and certain inferior executive officers by statute. The governor additionally possesses the ability to direct much of the executive branch through executive orders that are grounded in Law of the Kwara State or constitutionally granted executive power.

=== Juridical powers ===
The executive governor has the power to nominate the chief judge of the state. However, these nominations do require the house of assembly confirmation/approval. Governors may face significant challenges in getting legislative approval to shape the state judiciary according to their ideological views. Governors may also grant pardons and reprieves, as is often done just before the end of a governorship term, not without controversy.

== See also ==
- List of state governors of Nigeria
