= Ansarul Islam Society of Nigeria =

The Ansarul Islam Society of Nigeria is a non-political Islamic voluntary organization headquartered in Ilorin, Kwara State, Nigeria. Founded on May 28, 1942, by the Islamic scholar and first Mufti of Ilorin, Muhammad Kamalud-Deen Al-Adaby (1893-2005), it was the first voluntary Muslim organization established in Northern Nigeria. The society was founded to propagate Islamic education and address the monopoly of Christian missionary societies over Western education in colonial Nigeria by introducing a harmonized dual curriculum that blended Arabic and Islamic literacy with Western formal education. Today, the organization oversees more than 200 primary schools, 17 secondary schools, and the Muhammad Kamalud-deen University, with branches extending across Nigeria and into Benin, Togo, and Ghana.

== History and foundation ==
The Ansarul Islam Society of Nigeria was officially established on May 28, 1942, in Ilorin by the prominent Islamic scholar, Shaykh Muhammad Kamalud-Deen Al-Adaby. The formation of the society was an organized response to the prevailing socio-religious environment in colonial Nigeria, where Western formal education was heavily monopolized by Christian missionary societies, which often required Muslim students to convert to Christianity to access formal schooling.

Shaykh Kamalud-Deen organized local Muslim scholars and community leaders, including elders such as Alhaji Salman Ake and Alhaji Muhammad Dendi, to establish a non-political voluntary agency aimed at providing Western literacy while preserving the Islamic identity of Muslim youths. Initially conceived as the "Ansarul Islam Adabiyyah Society," it was later unequivocally resolved to be named the Ansarul Islam Society of Nigeria. Following its inception, the defunct Northern Nigerian Government formally recognized Ansarul Islam, making it the first indigenous Muslim body to be granted "Voluntary Agency" status in Northern Nigeria.

=== Historical challenges and opposition ===
The establishment of the society's reformed educational framework faced significant domestic opposition from traditional Islamic scholars (Malams) in Northern Nigeria. Critics viewed the combination of secular Western curriculum with Islamic education as a form of bid'ah makruhu (undesirable innovation). The introduction of physical educational aids such as blackboards, chalk, dusters, printed textbooks, and the collection of school fees into traditional Arabic schools was aggressively resisted, with some critics labeling the initiatives as contrary to ancestral traditions. To overcome financial constraints and staff recruitment deficits, the founder initially relied on voluntary service from senior graduates and personal fund-raising under the concept of fisabilillah (donations in the cause of Allah).

== Educational framework ==
The core philosophy of the Ansarul Islam Society relies on a harmonized educational framework that integrated Western sciences and English literacy alongside structured Arabic language and Islamic studies, introducing a synchronized dual curriculum to replace traditional informal Quranic schools.

=== Primary education ===
The society’s premier primary school emerged from Al-Madrasat Al-Adabiuyyah (established by the founder in 1938). On January 5, 1947, the society established its first formal primary school on Kamalud-deen Street, which was later relocated to its permanent site at Okekere, Ilorin, in January 1955. Officially commissioned as the Ansarul Islam Local Government Education Authority Primary School Okekere on January 3, 1955, it commenced with an initial intake of 23 pupils and achieved government recognition and certificate-granting status by December 1957. The institution grew from 751 pupils and 18 trained teachers in 1972 to an enrollment of 3,733 pupils with 92 teachers by January 1988.

The Okekere primary school campus historically serves as a major community anchor for the society, hosting the iconic Ansarul Islam Friday weekly lecture gathering, which draws large numbers of members for regional spiritual sermons and communal solidarity. The society systematically expanded its primary network across Northern Nigeria, building its first external Islamiyyah primary school in Kano (Sabon-Gari Street) in 1945, followed by Nguru (1947), Kaduna (1960), and Jos (1970).

List of Islamiyyah Primary Schools Founded by Ansarul Islam (1945–2002)
! Name of School	Location	Year Founded	
1	Ansarul Islam Society of Nigeria Islamiyyah School	Kano	1945
2	Ansarul Islam Society of Nigeria Islamiyyah School	Nguru	1947
3	Ansarul Islam Society of Nigeria Islamiyyah School	Kaduna	1960
4	Ansarul Islam Society of Nigeria Islamiyyah School	Jos	1970
5	Ansarul Islam Society of Nigeria Islamiyyah School	Zaria	1980
6	Ansarul Islam Society of Nigeria Islamiyyah School	Sokoto	1990
7	Ansarul Islam Society of Nigeria Islamiyyah School	Buruku	1990
8	Ansarul Islam Society of Nigeria Islamiyyah School	Saminaka	1990
9	Ansarul Islam Society of Nigeria Islamiyyah School	Katsina	1991
10	Ansarul Islam Society of Nigeria Islamiyyah School	Jibya	1991
11	Ansarul Islam Society of Nigeria Islamiyyah School	Abuja	2007
12	Ansarul Islam Society of Nigeria Islamiyyah School	Maiduguri	2002

Source: Eliasu Yahaya (2020) via LASU Journal of Religions & Peace Studies.

=== Secondary education ===
In 1970, the society expanded into secondary infrastructure by establishing the Ansarul Islam Society Secondary School at Ijomu-Oro, which holds the historic distinction of being the first co-educational secondary school established by the society. To further advance the academic legacy of its founder, the society established its premier flagship urban college, the Muhammad Kamaludeen College, alongside various secondary branches across diverse local government areas.

Chronological Growth of Ansarul Islam Secondary Schools (1970–2002)
! Name of School	Year Founded	
1	Ansarul Islam Society Secondary School, Ijomu-Oro	1970
2	Ansarul Islam Society Secondary School, Ogidi	1971
3	Ansarul Islam Society Secondary School, Maloko	1980
4	Ansarul Islam Society Secondary School, Igbonla	1980
5	Ansarul Islam Society Secondary School, Samora	1981
6	Ansarul Islam Society Secondary School, Budo-Are	1981
7	Ansarul Islam Society Secondary School, Ikotun	1982
8	Ansarul Islam Society Secondary School, Oko-Ode	1982
9	Ansarul Islam Society Secondary School, Jos	1985
10	Ansarul Islam Society Secondary School, Marafa Oja	1986
11	Ansarul Islam Society Secondary School, Laduba	1992
12	Ansarul Islam Society Secondary School, Omu-Aran	1998
13	Ansarul Islam Society Secondary School, Gure	2000
14	Ansarul Islam Society Secondary School, Teberu	2002

Source: Eliasu Yahaya (2020) via LASU Journal of Religions & Peace Studies.

=== Tertiary education ===
In 1962, the founder visited Egypt and secured a historic academic partnership with Al-Azhar University. This collaboration culminated in the 1963 launch of the Al-Mahad ad-Dīnī al-Azharī (Ma'had Institute of Higher Islamic Studies) in Ilorin. The institute was initially staffed by native Egyptian tutors sponsored directly by the Egyptian government, establishing a rigorous intermediate standard for advanced Arabic and theological studies in the region.

Following the federal deregulation of private tertiary institutions in Nigeria in 1993, the society initiated a multi-decade tertiary development blueprint to crown its educational pipeline. In further efforts to advance higher education in Nigeria, the Ansarul Islam Society launched the first phase of its university in Ilorin on January 19, 2003, naming the institution in honor of its revered founder, Shaykh Kamalud-Deen.

The university project culminated after years of development when the institution received official approval and its operational license from the National Universities Commission (NUC) in 2023, immediately commencing full academic activities thereafter. Named directly after the founder, MKU was established to actualize his lifelong vision of a top-tier Islamic-integrated university framework, allowing students to transition from the society's primary and secondary streams directly into specialized tertiary research.

== Organizational structure and leadership ==
The Ansarul Islam Society operates under a centralized structural model that distinguishes between ultimate spiritual-operational guidance and subordinate day-to-day administrative executive council management.

Supreme administrative and spiritual direction of the society is held by the Khalifah Adabiyyah, a title honoring the scholastic lineage of the founder. In this dual capacity, the Khalifah acts as both the ultimate spiritual leader and the overarching General Manager of the society's institutional affairs, sitting at the apex of the organizational hierarchy. Following the passing of the previous spiritual head, Shaykh Abdulqodir Adisa Kamaldeen, leadership transitioned to Shaykh Mustapha Muhammad Kamaldeen.

Day-to-day operational policies, asset control, and international branch relations are handled by the National Executive Council, which functions under the grand supervision of the Khalifah. This council is led by a National President and a National Vice President, who govern executive affairs alongside the Secretary-General.

The spiritual propagation, dawah, and public lectures are driven by the Mission Board. The executive spiritual administration is directed by the National Missioner.

To facilitate specialized outreach, the society incorporates active demographic sub-wings, including the Ansarul Islam Women's Wing and the Youth Wing, which focus on targeted community activities and regional conferences.

The society preserves deep ties with traditional institutions, with the Emir of Ilorin serving as its permanent Grand Patron.

== Social impact ==
Beyond standard classrooms, the society interacts functionally with community frameworks across West Africa. It Employs structured Islamic social finance initiatives to fund targeted health interventions, feeding schemes, and educational scholarships for vulnerable populations. It has introduced localized adult literacy programs and vocational skill centers focused on the economic self-reliance of Muslim women.
