= Adetola Ariyike Salau =

Nigerian author and politician (born 1977)

Adetola Salau
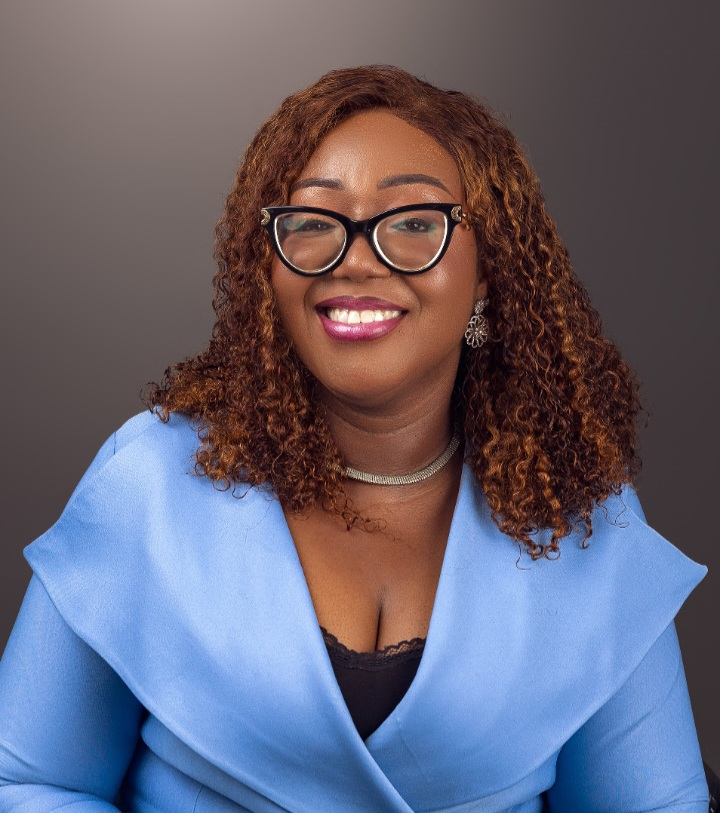
- STEMM Education Advocate

Special Adviser on STEMM Education and Corporate Sector Engagement to the Minister of Education
- Incumbent
- Assumed office July 2025
- Minister: Maruf Tunji Alausa

Special Adviser on Education, Policy Formulation and Human Capital Development to the Governor of Kwara State
- In office November 2023 – 2025
- Governor: AbdulRahman AbdulRazaq

Senior Special Assistant on Education to the Governor of Lagos State
- In office 2020–2023
- Governor: Babajide Sanwo-Olu

Personal details
- Born: 24 June 1977 (age 49) Elizabeth, New Jersey, U.S.
- Education: Fordham University; Syracuse University; University at Buffalo
- Occupation: Educator, engineer, author
- Known for: STEM and STEAM education

Adetola Ariyike Salau (born 24 June 1977) is a Nigerian-American educator, education policy specialist, and author. She has worked in education policy and STEM education in Nigeria and the United States. Salau served as Senior Special Assistant on Education to the Governor of Lagos State, Babajide Sanwo-Olu, from 2020 to 2023, and as Special Adviser on Education, Policy Formulation, and Human Capital Development to the Governor of Kwara State, AbdulRahman AbdulRazaq, from 2023 to 2025. Currently serves as Special Adviser to the Honourable Minister of Education on STEMM (Science, Technology, Engineering, Mathematics, and Medical Sciences) and Corporate Sector Engagement.

== Early life and education ==
Adetola Ariyike Salau was born on 24 June 1977 in Elizabeth, New Jersey, USA. Her mother is Dr (Mrs) Oreoluwa A. Salau, a climatologist, environmentalist and the first female meteorologist in Nigeria. Her father is Prof. Ademola T. Salau, an environmentalist at the United Nations in New York and the former Vice-Chancellor of the University of Port Harcourt. She studied chemistry at Fordham University and later obtained master's degrees in chemical engineering and engineering management from Syracuse University.

Adetola subsequently earned a PhD in Curriculum, Instruction and the Science of Learning from the University at Buffalo, State University of New York. She also holds a mathematics educator licence in New York and has taught in schools and higher-education institutions in the United States, including in New York, California, South Carolina and North Carolina.

== Career ==
=== New York City ===
Adetola started her career as a mathematics public-school teacher in New York City and also taught in California, South Carolina, and North Carolina. She previously served as an adjunct lecturer at Fordham University before her appointment as Senior Special Assistant on Education to the Executive Governor of Lagos State in 2020.

=== Lagos State ===
In 2020, Adetola was appointed by Babajide Sanwo-Olu, the executive governor of Lagos State, as Senior Special Assistant on Education. She served in the role until 2023, working on education policy, STEM and STEAM education, teacher development and education technology initiatives.

=== Kwara State ===
In November 2023, AbdulRahman AbdulRazaq, the executive governor of Kwara State, appointed Adetola as Special Adviser on Education, Policy Formulation and Human Capital Development. Her portfolio included education policy, STEM and STEAM programmes, digital learning and partnerships within the education sector.

=== Federal Ministry of Education ===
In July 2025, Maruf Tunji Alausa, the Federal Minister of Education, appointed Adetola as his pecial Adviser on STEMM Education and Corporate Sector Engagement. In the role, she advises the minister on STEMM education and supports engagement between the Federal Ministry of Education and the corporate sector.

== Awards and recognition ==
Salau has participated in several international education and innovation programmes, including the MIT Innovation and Entrepreneurship Bootcamp, the HP Cambridge Partnership for Education EdTech Fellowship and the MovingWorlds Institute. She has also received recognitions including the Ambassador of STEM Award and the Africa Award for Excellence.

== Foundation and initiatives ==
In 2015, Adetola founded Carisma4U Educational Foundation, an organisation focused on STEM education, teacher development and educational innovation. The organisation subsequently developed into ELIA Africa, which works in education, leadership, innovation and related capacity-development programmes.

== Author ==
Adetola has authored educational books and resources on STEM and education, including STEM Is Key, STEM Activities in Algebra, Geometry & Personal Finance. In 2025, she published Bridging Two Worlds and Reimagining African Education, which examine her professional journey and approaches to education reform in Africa.
