= Abdulwahab Femi Agbaje Whyte =

Nigerian politician

Honourable Abdulwahab Femi Agbaje Whyte

Special Adviser to the Governor of Kwara State on Political Matters
- Governor: AbdulRahman AbdulRazaq

Commissioner for Energy
- In office December 2022 – 2023
- Governor: AbdulRahman AbdulRazaq

Commissioner for Water Resources
- In office August 2022 – December 2022
- Governor: AbdulRahman AbdulRazaq

Commissioner for Enterprise
- In office October 2019 – August 2022
- Governor: AbdulRahman AbdulRazaq

Personal details
- Born: Abdulwahab Femi Agbaje Whyte; June 13, 1967 (age 59) Offa, Kwara State, Nigeria
- Education: Ladoke Akintola University of Technology National Diploma (Accounting); Higher National Diploma (Accounting); Master of Public Administration
- Occupation: Politician, public administrator, businessman
- Known for: Public service and politics in Kwara State

Hon. Abdulwahab Femi Agbaje Whyte, also known as Femi Whyte, is a Nigerian politician, businessman and public administrator from Offa, Kwara State. He has served as the Commissioner for Enterprise, Water Resources, and Energy in the Kwara State Executive Council under Governor AbdulRahman AbdulRazaq. He later served as the Special Adviser to the Governor on Political Matters.

== Early life and education ==
Whyte is from Offa, Kwara State, Nigeria.

He obtained a National Diploma (ND) and Higher National Diploma (HND) in Accounting before earning a Master of Public Administration (MPA) from Ladoke Akintola University of Technology (LAUTECH).

== Political career ==
Whyte was elected Councillor-elect for Shawo South West Ward, Offa, in 1996. He later became State Chairman of the All Nigeria People's Party (ANPP) in Kwara State in 2006 and subsequently served as the party's National Vice Chairman. During the 2019 general election, he served as Director of the Contact and Mobilisation Committee of the AbdulRahman AbdulRazaq Campaign Organisation after previously serving on the Contact and Mobilisation Committee of the Muhammadu Buhari Campaign Organisation

=== Commissioner ===
In October 2019, Whyte was nominated by Governor AbdulRahman AbdulRazaq as a commissioner and was confirmed by the Kwara State House of Assembly. He was initially assigned the portfolio of Commissioner for Enterprise following the inauguration of the State Executive Council. In August 2022, he was reassigned as Commissioner for Water Resources during a cabinet reshuffle. In December 2022, another cabinet reshuffle saw him become Commissioner for Energy, a position he held until leaving the cabinet.

=== Special Adviser on Political Matters ===
In 2024, Governor AbdulRahman AbdulRazaq appointed Whyte as Special Adviser on Political Matters, making him a member of the Kwara State Executive Council responsible for political coordination and stakeholder engagement.

=== 2027 House of Representatives aspiration ===
In April 2026, Whyte declared his intention to contest for the Ifelodun/Offa/Oyun Federal Constituency seat in the House of Representatives on the platform of the All Progressives Congress (APC) ahead of the 2027 Nigerian general election.
