= Amina Ahmed El-Imam =

Nigerian microbiologist and politician

- Born: 27 July 1983 (age 43)
- Citizenship: Nigerian
- Education: Ahmadu Bello University; University of Nottingham
- Employer(s): Kwara State Government, University of Ilorin
- Title: Kwara State Commissioner for Health

Amina Ahmed El-Imam (born 27 July 1983) is a Nigerian microbiologist, academic and politician who is Commissioner for Health in Kwara State. She is a Native of Offa, Kwara State and senior lecturer in microbiology at the University of Ilorin, Nigeria.

== Early life and education ==
Born on 27 July 1983, in Nigeria, El-Imam obtained a microbiology degrees at Ahmadu Bello University, Zaria, Nigeria. She was on a 9-month fellowship as a Fulbright Visiting Scholar at the North Carolina State University, Raleigh, North Carolina.

== Career ==
Ahmed El-Imam, a senior lecturer specializing in food and industrial microbiology at the University of Ilorin, is serving as a faculty member in microbiology. She completed her Ph.D. in Biological Systems and Organisms at the University of Nottingham in the United Kingdom in 2017. Her academic journey also includes a Master's degree in the same field from Ahmadu Bello University in 2007 and an undergraduate degree in Biological Systems and Organisms from the same university in 2003.

=== Academic ===
El-Imam is a senior lecturer in microbiology at the University of Ilorin, Nigeria, specializing in food and industrial microbiology. Her research has primarily focused on food preservation and understanding the microorganisms associated with the spoilage of various traditional foods. She leads a research group specializing in the statistical optimization of fermentative processes.

=== Politics ===
El-Imam assumed the position of Kwara State Commissioner for Health on 5 September 2023 after being nominated on 27 July 2023 and receiving confirmation on 29 August 2023.

== Notable achievements ==
El-Imam joined the Advisory Board of PressPayNg, an Education Technology Company offering creative funding solutions for tertiary institution students in Nigeria. She authored two books, "Knowing Microbes" and "Time Management for Professional Women," which were launched on her birthday.

El-Imam's appointment was confirmed on 29 August 2023, as the head of the Kwara State Ministry of Health, with the title of Kwara State Commissioner for Health.

El-Imam is a member of the Organisation for Women in Science for the Developing World.

== Medical Outreach in Kwara ==
El-Imam participated in various initiatives including medical outreach programs across the state, a visitation to Offa Specialist Hospital, and an official visit to a victim of a fallen tree in Ilorin. Additionally, she played a key role in the flag-off of the 2023 Measles Campaign and Routine Immunization Outreach in Ilorin The Governor's approval of a statewide health outreach further underscored the significance of these efforts. Moreover, Dr. El-Imam took charge of the Cancer Treatment Center, addressing the alarming statistic of 62,000 annual cancer deaths in Nigeria, as highlighted by Governor Abdulrahaman Abdulrazaq on 6 October 2023. This comprehensive approach reflects her commitment to enhancing healthcare and addressing critical health issues in Kwara State.
