= Kwara State Governor's House =

Official residence of the governor of Kwara State

Kwara State House
- Interactive map of the Kwara State House area

General information
- Location: Ahmadu Bello Way, Ilorin, Kwara State, Nigeria
- Coordinates: 8°29′10″N 4°34′38″E
- Current tenants: AbdulRahman AbdulRazaq, Governor of Kwara State and Kwara State First family.
- Construction started: 1988
- Completed: 2007
- Owner: Kwara State Government

Kwara State House, also known as Ahmadu Bello House, is the official residence of the governor of Kwara State. Located along Ahmadu Bello Way in Ilorin, Kwara State, it serves both official and residential purposes.
