= Olufolake Abdulrazaq =

Nigerian public servant (born 1967)

Ambassador Prof. Olufolake Abdulrazaq

First Lady of Kwara State, Nigeria
- In office 2019–Present
- President: Bola Tinubu

Director at the Nigeria Ministry of Foreign Affairs
- In office March 2019 – October 2021

Personal details
- Born: Olufolake Molawa Davies; August 2, 1967 Lagos, Nigeria
- Spouse: AbdulRahman AbdulRazaq
- Education: University of Lagos
- Occupation: Diplomat, Humanitarian

Olufolake Molawa Davies Abdulrazaq (born 2 August 1967), is a Nigerian diplomat, public servant, and humanitarian. She was born in Lagos and graduated from University of Lagos in 1991. Olufolake is the First Lady of Kwara State since 2019, and she served as a Director of the Economic and Legal Department at Nigeria's Ministry of Foreign Affairs until 2021. Her career as a diplomat started in 1993, and she has held senior roles in Nigeria’s foreign missions in the United Kingdom, South Africa, and France, including as Counsellor at the Nigerian High Commission in London between 1998 and 2004.

In 2019, Olufolake founded the Ajike People Support Centre, a non-profit focused on women's empowerment, healthcare, education, and youth development. Recognition she has earned for her work include being named First Lady of the Year by The Sun Nigeria in 2023.

== Early life and education ==
Olufolake was born on 2 August 1967 in Lagos, Nigeria. During the Nigerian Civil War, her father Hezekiah Olufela Davies was posted to the United States as an information attaché to the Nigerian embassy, where she spent part of her early childhood. She later returned to Lagos to complete her primary and secondary education.

Olufolake earned a degree in history from the University of Lagos in 1988 and completed her National Youth Service Corps programme with the 1st Mechanized Infantry Division of the Nigerian Army in Kaduna. In 1990, she earned a postgraduate qualification in Mass Communication, followed by a master's program in international law and diplomacy she completed in 1991, both from the University of Lagos.In 2019, she was conferred with a Doctor of Science (Honoris Causa) by the Paris-based European American University.

In 2020, the Geofidel Institute for Leadership and Management (UK) conferred on her an Honorary Doctorate in Gender Development. In September 2022, she received an Honorary PhD in Social Policy and Administration from Prowess University, United States. In August 2023, she was also conferred with an Honorary Professorship in International Relations by the International Entrepreneur University, also based in Delaware, USA.

== Diplomatic career ==
Olufolake began her diplomatic service in 1993 with the Nigeria Foreign Affairs Ministry. Between 1994 and 1998, she served as Third Secretary and Foreign Service Officer at the Ministry’s Lagos liaison office. From 1998 to 2004, she was designated Counsellor in charge of Political Affairs, Investment, Administration, and Trade at the Nigerian High Commission in London.

Between 2004 and 2007, she served as Head of Chancery and Head of Trade and Investment at the Nigerian High Commission in Pretoria, South Africa. From 2007 to 2010, she was Minister Counsellor at the Ministry’s headquarters in Abuja. She was appointed to the Nigerian Embassy in Paris from 2010 to 2013.

From 2013 to 2014, Olufolake served as Assistant Director in the Office of the Honourable Minister. She then returned to the London High Commission as Minister Head Commonwealth desk in 2015 and Minister Head of Consular, Education and Welfare in 2016.

Between November 2017 and September 2018, Olufolake served as Acting Director at the Foreign Affairs Ministry’s headquarters in Abuja. She was subsequently appointed as Acting Director and led the Trade and Economic Cooperation Division until 2019. Since March 2019, she served as Director of the Economic, and Legal Department until October 2021. She also serves as the Ministry’s alternate representative on the board of the NIPC.

== Role as First Lady ==
Olufolake founded the Ajike People Support Centre, a non-profit focused on empowering women, youth, and vulnerable groups founded in 2019. Through the Centre, she has led humanitarian programmes including engaging young people through creative arts, sports, and awareness campaigns on drug abuse and cybercrime.

In 2020, Olufolake provided COVID-19 relief to vulnerable communities across Kwara State. As reported, over 200 households received palliatives under the Northern Governors' Wives' Forum. She also donated ₦100,000 to the Kwara Ladies Football Club and distributed locally made face masks from the state's Female Tailors Association.

In 2023, Olufolake was appointed Malaria Ambassador of Kwara State after leading the advocacy efforts that contributed to a drop in malaria prevalence among children under five. In 2025, she was appointed Chairperson of the Board of Advisors for the Global Sustainability Summit and Awards (GSSA).

== Appointments ==
- 2020: Ambassador in Situ.
- 2023: Chairperson, Nigeria Governors’ Spouses Forum.
- Patron, Africa Fashion Week London.
- Matron, Kwara State Drug Control Committee.
- Matron, Nigerian Red Cross Society.
- National Vice President, Nigeria Baseball and Softball Association.

== Recognition ==
- 2021: Most Outstanding State TB Champion.
- 2021: African Peace Legend Award.
- 2021: Named North‑Central First Lady of the Year and First Lady of the Year by Independent Nigeria.
- 2022: West Africa Youth Council Award.
- 2023: The First Lady of the Year by The Sun Nigeria.
- 2024: Honoured at the Annual Afro Awards.
