= Bolanle Olukoju =

Nigerian politician

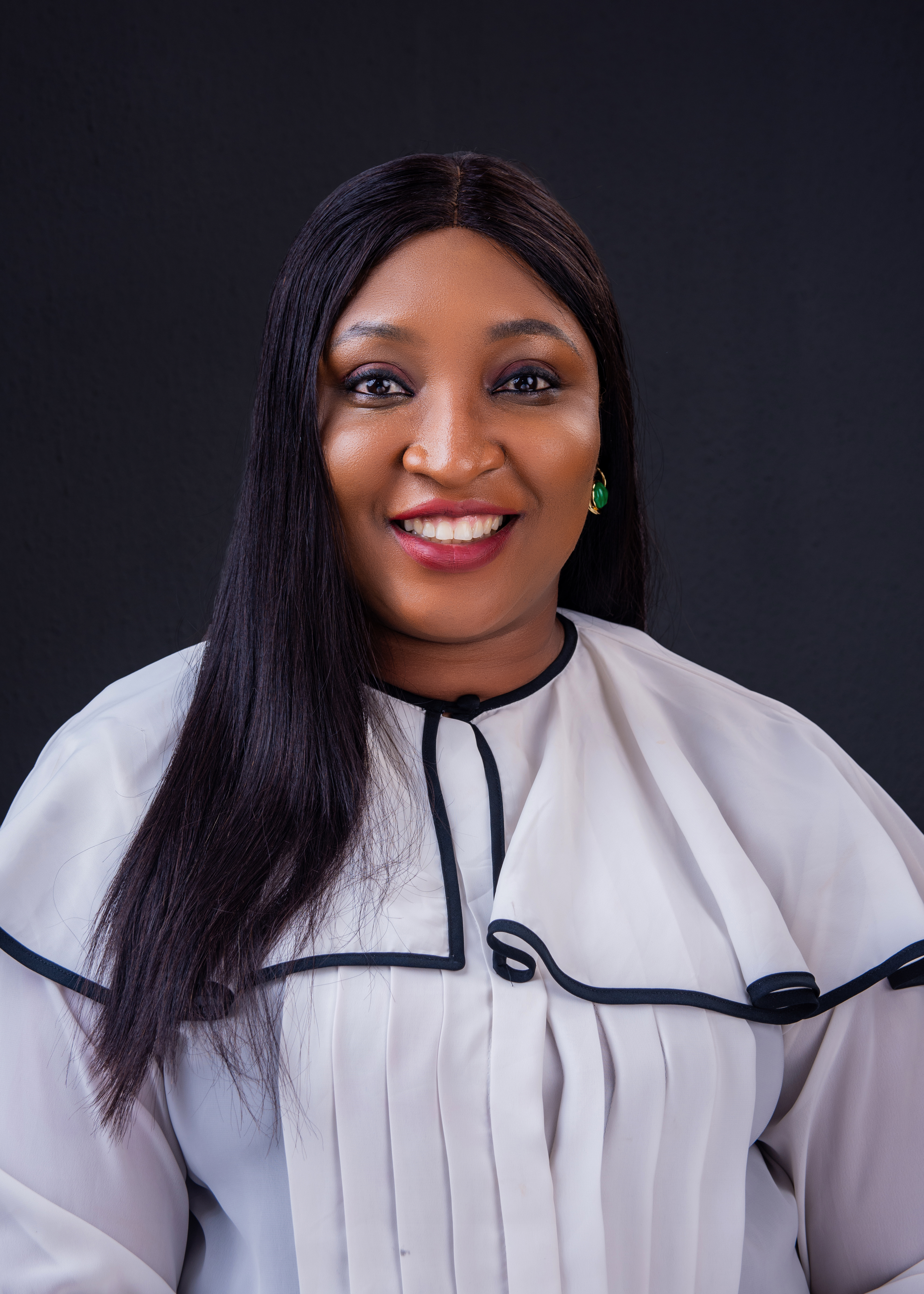

Commissioner for Communications, Kwara State
- Incumbent
- Assumed office September 4, 2023
- Preceded by: Abubakar Saddiq Buhari

Personal details
- Born: Bolanle Bello
- Citizenship: Nigerian
- Education: Ahmadu Bello University
- Occupation: Public Relations Professional; Public Speaker; Entrepreneur; Politician

Bolanle "Bola" Olukoju is a Nigerian public relations expert, entrepreneur, community organiser, and technocrat. She currently serves as the Honourable Commissioner for Communications (Arts, Culture, Tourism, Information, and Creative Economy) in Kwara State and is a member of the State Executive Council under Governor AbdulRahman AbdulRazaq (CON). She was sworn into office on 4 September 2023.

Prior to this role, she was the Director of Communications for KwaraLEARN. Before joining KwaraLEARN, Bola was the Team Lead for Marketing and Communications at Rising Phoenix Holdings Corporation. She also co-founded The Eureka Tribe, a Public Relations, Advertising, and Sponsorship agency based in Lagos. Additionally, she served as the executive director of the Babyhood Foundation.

Bola is also recognised for her advocacy in digital literacy, raising awareness about the dangers of fake news in various public forums. She is an advocate for good governance and supports the principles of effective, ethical, and accountable management within governments. Additionally, Bola is a strong proponent of gender and youth inclusion in politics, emphasising the need for increased participation and representation of women and young people in Nigerian political processes and decision-making.

== Background ==
Bola is from Iludun-Oro in Irepodun Local Government Area of Kwara State.

== Education and professional affiliations ==
Bola attended Comprehensive High School in Iludun-Oro and holds a degree in Land Survey and Geoinformatics from Ahmadu Bello University, Zaria. She is also a member of the Nigerian Institute of Public Relations (NIPR).

== Role as commissioner ==
As the State Commissioner for Communications (Arts, Culture, Tourism, Information, and Creative Economy), Bola Olukoju has been actively involved in several key initiatives and events. She serves as one of the steering committee members for implementing the Adolescent Girls Initiative for Learning and Empowerment (AGILE) Project, a collaboration between the Federal Government of Nigeria and the World Bank. The project aims to improve access to quality secondary education for adolescent girls in Kwara State.

In November 2023, she was part of the Kwara State delegation that accompanied Governor AbdulRahman AbdulRazaq to the Intra-African Trade Fair in Cairo, Egypt. During this event, the Kwara State Government signed a partnership deal with the Nigerian Export-Import Bank (NEXIM) to facilitate export-related industrialisation and promote investment in the state's local resources.

In March 2024, she received the Excellence in Corporate Governance Award at the Nigeria Institute of Public Relations (NIPR) National Spokespersons Awards in Abuja, on behalf of the Kwara State Government.

The following month, in April 2024, she was elected Treasurer of the Forum of Commissioners for Culture, Tourism, Arts, Heritage, and Creative Economy in Nigeria during a meeting of the Forum held in Abuja.

In May 2024, she presided over the Kwara State Government's first-ever Inter-Ministerial Press Briefing, where the administration's achievements during the first year of Governor AbdulRazaq's second term were presented.

In August 2024, Bola was named as a member of the 18-member Kwara State Minimum Wage Tripartite Committee. The committee was constituted by Governor AbdulRazaq to work out the consequential adjustments required following the new national minimum wage of ₦70,000.

== Recognition ==
In July 2024, Bola was named one of the Top 50 Nigerians shaping the future of communications, recognised for driving innovation and impact across Nigeria and the diaspora. She was ranked 3rd on the 2024 PR Power List, compiled by GLG Communications in partnership with The Guardian newspaper.

Bola was a featured fireside speaker and award recipient at the 9th Lagos Digital PR Summit, an event held at the Muson Centre in Onikan, Lagos, which celebrated notable contributions to public relations and digital communications.

== See also ==
- AbdulRahman AbdulRazaq
- Kwara State Executive Council
