= Michael Umale Adikwu =

Nigerian academic

Vice-Chancellor of the University of Abuja

Personal details
- Born: Michael Umale Adikwu; 19 April 1963 (age 63)
- Education: University of Nigeria, Nsukka
- Occupation: Academic; author
- Profession: pharmacist

Michael Umale Adikwu (born 19 April 1963) is a Nigerian academic, pharmacist and the former Vice-Chancellor of the University of Abuja. He was appointed on 30 June 2014.

== Education ==
Adikwu attended St. Paul's Primary School, Utonkon, from 1970 to 1975 and Federal Government College, Jos, from 1976 to 1981. After graduating from Federal Government College, he obtained his Pharmacy degree at University of Nigeria, Nsukka, in 1986 and later obtained his Master's in 1989 and his Doctorate in 1994 from the same university.

== Career ==
Adikwu worked as a hospital pharmacist at the Health Services Management Board in Benue starting in 1988. He began as a Lecturer II at the University of Nigeria, Nsukka in 1990. He served as head of department from 1995 to 1998 and 2002–2004 and was named as Professor of Pharmaceutics in 1998. He served as Vice Chancellor of the University of Abuja from 2014 to 2019. He served as visiting professor at the University of Manchester and has written more than 170 journal articles.

Adikwu has won many scholarships in the course of his career, including Associate of the Third World Academy of Sciences in Trieste in Italy (2008) and a Global Technological Entertainment and Development (TED) Conference Travel Fellowship, Arusha Tanzania, in 2007. He held an Alexander Von Humboldt Foundation Fellowship in Germany from 1999 to 2000; Matsumae International Foundation Fellowship, Japan in year 2002; Federal Scholarship for Best 20 Students, University of Nigeria, Nsukka in year 1982–1986; Federal Scholarship for Best 3 Students, Federal Government College, Jos.

== Awards and honors ==
Adikwu has received research grants from the Royal Society of Chemistry of Great Britain, the Third World Academy of Sciences, the International Foundation for Science in Sweden, the Raw Materials Research and Development Council in Abuja, and the National Institute for Pharmaceutical Research and Development in Abuja.

He received the Nigerian Academy of Science's Outstanding Scholar in Science award in 2006 and the May and Baker Professional Service Award in Pharmacy in 2009. Also in 2009, he was named Fellow of the Nigerian Academy of Science.

Adikwu can communicate in English, French and German.

Professor Adikwu married Victoria; they have six children.
