= Aisha Maikudi =

Vice Chancellor of the University of Abuja 2024-2025

Aisha Sani Maikudi

Vice-Chancellor of the University of Abuja
- In office 30 June 2024 (acting); 1 January 2025 (substantive) – 6 February 2025
- Preceded by: Abdul-Rasheed Na’Allah

Personal details
- Born: 31 January 1983 (age 43) Zaria, Kaduna State, Nigeria
- Education: University of Reading; London School of Economics and Political Science; University of Abuja

Aisha Sani Maikudi is a Nigerian professor of international law who briefly served as the 7th Vice-Chancellor of the University of Abuja. She was initially appointed as Acting Vice-Chancellor on 30 June 2024 following the end of Abdul-Rasheed Na’Allah's tenure. Her appointment as substantive Vice-Chancellor took effect on 1 January 2025 but was terminated on 6 February 2025 following a federal directive dissolving the university's governing council.

== Early life and education ==
Aisha Maikudi was born on 31 January 1983 in Zaria, Kaduna State. She completed her secondary education at Queen's College, Lagos in 1999. She obtained a Bachelor of Laws (LL.B.) from the University of Reading in 2004 and later earned a Master of Laws (LL.M.) from the London School of Economics and Political Science in 2005. In 2015, she completed a Doctor of Philosophy (Ph.D.) in International Law at the University of Abuja. She became a professor in 2022.

== Career ==
Maikudi joined the University of Abuja in 2008 as a Lecturer II in the Faculty of Law. In 2014, she was appointed as the Head of the Department of Public and International Law. She later served as Deputy Dean of the Faculty of Law and became the pioneer Director of the University of Abuja’s International Centre in 2018.

In June 2024, she was appointed as the Acting Vice-Chancellor of the University of Abuja and later confirmed as the substantive Vice-Chancellor in January 2025. However, her tenure was cut short in February 2025 following a presidential directive dissolving the university’s governing council and reversing her appointment.

== Controversy ==
Maikudi’s appointment as Vice-Chancellor was met with criticism from some members of the academic community. In December 2024, a group of professors submitted a petition to the Federal Ministry of Education alleging irregularities in the selection process. The petitioners claimed that the governing council, led by retired Air Vice Marshal Saddiq Ismaila Kaita, had dismissed over 87 applications and shortlisted only three candidates, favoring a particular individual.

The controversy also centered on concerns that the appointment criteria were adjusted to accommodate Maikudi’s selection. The advertised requirements for the position reportedly omitted the standard prerequisite of ten years of professorial experience, which she did not meet at the time.

Following mounting pressure, President Bola Ahmed Tinubu approved the dissolution of the university’s governing council and reversed Maikudi’s appointment as Vice-Chancellor in February 2025.

== Memberships ==
Maikudi is a member of the Nigerian Bar Association and the International Federation of Women Lawyers.
