= Muhammad Kamalud-Deen Al-Adaby =

Nigerian Islamic scholar and educator

- Born: Muhammad Habibullah; 1893; Ilorin, Northern Nigeria Protectorate
- Died: 18 December 2005 (aged 111–112); Ilorin, Kwara State, Nigeria
- Occupations: Islamic scholar, educator, author
- Organization: Ansarul Islam Society of Nigeria
- Known for: Modernization of Arabic and Islamic education in Nigeria
- Title: Grand Mufti of Ilorin
- Awards: Member of the Order of the Federal Republic (MFR); Officer of the Order of the Federal Republic (OFR); Kwara State Merit Award; ORSA Award; Fellowship in Islamic Studies, Nigeria (FISN)

Muhammad Kamalud-Deen Al-Adaby (1893–2005), also known as Alhaji Agba, was a prominent Nigerian Islamic scholar who reformed educational methods in Nigeria and was the founder of a number of educational, religious, and civic organizations, including Azumratul Adabiyyah Al-Kamoliyyah, the Ansarul Islam Society of Nigeria, Muhammad Kamalud-Deen College, and Muhammad Kamalud-Deen University..

== Early life ==
Shayk Kamalud-Deen was born in 1893 to the Aragbaji family in the Okekere area of the Ilorin Emirate. This historic neighborhood was known for its association with Islamic scholarship and religious teaching, which helped shape Ilorin's role as a center for Islamic learning in Nigeria.

He studied the Quran at an early age under Mallam Ahmod Tijani and Salahud-Deen in the Baba Ita compound of Alore, Ilorin, and graduated in 1919. He continued his education under the Arabic scholar Shaykh Muhammad Taju al-Adab, and was admitted to the Adabiyyah School of Shaykh Taju al-Adab on March 28, 1920. Under his mentor's guidance he began delivering public lectures, the first of which took place in Ihumbo, Ogun State, Nigeria. His mentor Shaykh Taju al-Adab died in 1922, after which Shaykh Kamalud-Deen began his Da'wah activities.

== Career ==
Shaykh Kamalud-Deen established his Arabic school Azumratul Adabiyyah Al-Kamoliyyah in Lagos, Nigeria in 1926, with the Ilorin branch established in 1930. At first he followed traditional methods of teaching, but began his educational reform activities in 1938 after returning from the Hajj. He became the first person to introduce the use of benches, tables, blackboards, curricula, uniforms, daily exercises, and assemblies, pioneering these innovations in Southwest Nigeria. He also reduced the learning period by organizing his pupils into classes and conducting promotional examinations at the end of each term. Additionally, he introduced the staging of Arabic dramas as an extracurricular activity to enhance language acquisition among his students and promote Arabic education to the public.He is credited as the pioneer of the modernization of Arabic and Islamic studies education in Southwest Nigeria.

Some of Shayk Kamalud-Deen's notable students include Shaykh Yakub Alawo, Shaykh Sharafadeen Ajara, Sheikh Ali Olukade, Shaykh Khidir Apaokagi (second Mufti of Ilorin),Sheikh Abdul Raheem Oniwasi Agbaye, Olushola Saraki, Fatia Williams (former Chief Justice of Nigeria), Kamalud-deen Balogun (Mufti of Egbaland),Sheikh Abdulateef Bello, Moshood Mahmood Jimba , (Deputy Vice-Chancellor of Kwara State University), , and Hon Justice A. Lateef Kamaludeen (Grand Khadi of Kwara State).

== Achievements ==
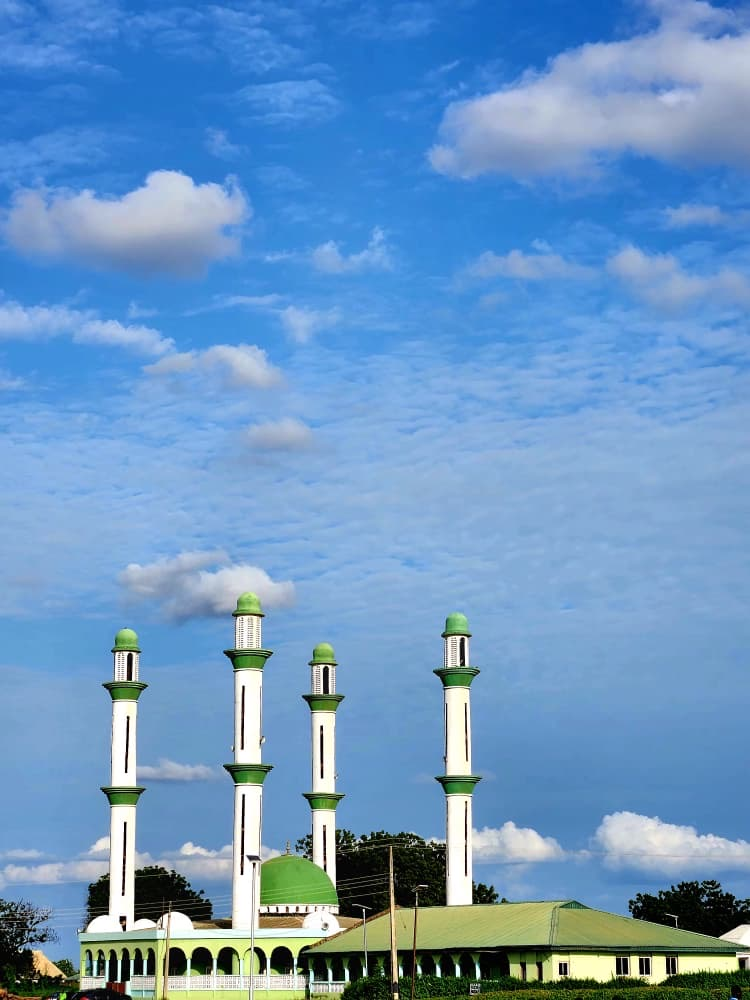
The headquarters mosque of the Ansarul Islam Society of Nigeria in Ilorin.

In 1942, Shaykh Kamalud-Deen founded the first voluntary Muslim organization in Northern Nigeria, the Ansarul Islam Society of Nigeria.

In 1962, he visited Al-Azhar University in Cairo and reached an agreement with the university's authorities to establish a branch in Ilorin, Nigeria, known as Al-Mahad ad-Dīnī al-Azharī. The school began operations in 1963, with some of its tutors being Egyptian scholars sent by the Egyptian government. In further efforts to advance higher education in Nigeria, the Ansarul Islam Society launched the first phase of its university in Ilorin on January 19, 2003, naming the university in honor of Shaykh Kamalud-Deen. The institution received official approval from the National Universities Commission in 2023, and thereafter began its academic activities.

Between 1958 and 1961, Shaykh Kamalud-Deen served as a member and a councillor of the Transition Committee of the Ilorin Native Authority, formed by the government of Northern Nigeria under Sir Ahmadu Bello. He contributed financially to infrastructure projects in the 1970s, including the Pakata-Omoda-Ita-Ogunbo-Oja-Oba road network and the Government Secondary School in Ballah. His support also extended to the construction of the Ilorin City Hall, where he was a guest speaker at fund-raising events and made significant donations.

In the early 1970s, Shaykh Kamalud-Deen was the Chairman of the Committee of the World Muslim League, overseeing the translation of the Quran into the Yoruba language. Appointed to the fundraising committee in 1974 after the initial 1964 group saw little progress, he led the effort to finance the construction of the Ilorin Central Jumaat Mosque, which was completed and commissioned in 1981.

Shaykh Kamalud-Deen had connections with several Nigerian leaders, including Olusegun Obasanjo, Murtala Muhammed, and Shehu Shagari, and he accompanied Murtala Muhammed on the 1975 Hajj pilgrimage. Other notable figures with whom he associated included M.K.O. Abiola, Sultan Abubakar III, Sultan Ibrahim Dasuki, Shaykh Junaid of Sokoto, and prominent Islamic scholars Shaykh Nasir Kabara, Shaykh Abubakar Mahmood Gumi, and Shaykh Ahmad Lemu.

== Legacy and honors ==
Shaykh Kamalud-Deen was awarded the MFR (1963) and OFR (1981) by the Federal Government of Nigeria, the Kwara State Merit Award (1988), the ORSA Award (1992) from the Egyptian government, and an honorary D.Litt. (1998) from the University of Ilorin. In addition, the Nigeria Association of Teachers of Arabic and Islamic Studies (NATAIS) honored him with a Fellowship in Islamic Studies Nigeria (FISN) in 2002, and the Emir of Ilorin conferred upon him the title of the first Grand Mufti of Ilorin in 2004, the highest honor ever bestowed upon an Islamic scholar in the emirate. The Sheikh was married and had children who are embodiment of his islamic legacy.
