= Abdulganiyu Abdulrasaq =

Commissioner of Finance (1927–2020)

Abdulganiyu Folorunsho AbdulRazaq A.G.F
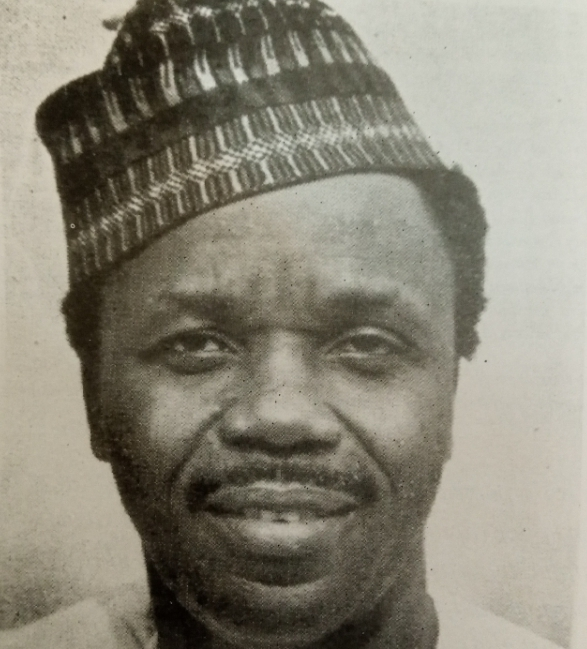

Vice-President of Nigerian Stock Exchange
- In office 1983–2000

President of Nigerian Stock Exchange
- In office 2000–2003

Personal details
- Born: November 13, 1927
- Died: July 25, 2020 (aged 92)
- Citizenship: Nigerian
- Spouse(s): Rahat Abdulrazaq, Loretta Kethleen Rasaq
- Children: 14
- Parents: Abdulrazaq (father); Munirat (mother)
- Occupation: Lawyer

Abdulganiyu Folorunsho AbdulRazaq (A.G.F) (November 13, 1927 – July 25, 2020) was the first Commissioner of Finance for Kwara State after the state was formed in 1967 under Yakubu Gowon's military administration. He was also the first lawyer from the Northern part of Nigeria. He was President of the Nigerian Stock Exchange from 2000 - 2003 and Vice-President of the Nigerian Stock Exchange from 1983 - 2000.

== Early life and education ==
Abdulganiyu was born in Onitsha on November 13, 1927, to Munirat and Abdul Rasaq. Both his parents were indigenous of Ilorin, Kwara State from Onokatapo and Yerinsa quarters (presently Adewole ward, Ilorin-West) respectively. He studied at the United African School in Ilorin from 1935 till 1936. In 1938, he started at CMS Central school, Onitsha and left in 1943 at the end of his primary education. He started his secondary education at the Kalahari National College, Buguma in 1944 and was there till 1945 when he left to attend African College, Onitsha. He was at African College till 1947. He was a foundation student at the University College, Ibadan (now University of Ibadan) in 1948.

== Career ==
Abdulganiyu Folorunsho AbdulRazaq was called to bar on February 8, 1955, at the Inner Temple, London. After his return to Nigeria, he was made a special member of the Northern House of Assembly from 1960 - 1962 following the Country's independence. Following that, he was the Nigerian Ambassador to the Republic of Ivory Coast from 1962 to 1964. He was a member of the Federal Parliament from 1964 to 1966 as the Federal Cabinet Minister of State for Transport. He then became the Kwara State Commissioner of Finance, Health and Social welfare from 1967 - 1972. Abdulganiyu was a member of the Capital Issues Commission from 1973 to 1978 and has also been a member of the International Commission of Jurists since 1959. He was the chairman of the Nigerian Council of human rights and has been the chairman since 1987.

Abdulganiyu was appointed a SAN in 1985.

== Personal life ==
AGF Abdul Razaq was married to his first wife Raliat AbdulRazaq and bore six children, Muhammad Alimi, Abdul Rahman, Khariat, Isiaka, Aisha and AbdulRauph. AGF AbdulRazaq was married outside of his tradition to an English girl called Loretta Kathleen Razaq, who was his second wife. With this marriage, he inherited two step-children whom he adopted, a son Vincent BabaTunde Macaulay and a daughter Clare Louise Macaulay. He had three daughters with Kathleen, Mary Yasmin Razaq, Katherine Amina Razaq and Suzanne Zainab Razaq. He also has another daughter called Rissicatou from Benin.
