= Kayode Alabi =

Nigerian politician (born 1963)

His Excellency Kayode Alabi

Deputy Governor of Kwara State
- Incumbent
- Assumed office 29 May 2019
- Governor: AbdulRahman AbdulRazaq

Personal details
- Born: Kayode Alabi; 1 August 1963 (age 63) Oro-Ago, Northern Region, Nigeria (now in Kwara State, Nigeria)
- Party: All Progressive Congress
- Occupation: Entrepreneur, education consultant, and politician
- Website: Kayode Alabi

Kayode Alabi ((born 1 August 1963) is a Nigerian politician, who is deputy governor of Kwara State. He was born in Oro-Ago, Kwara State, Nigeria into the family of late Yahaya Samuel Alabi (1925–2007) Oro-Ago in Kwara State, he is the third child of his parents. He has two elder brothers and a younger sister. Alabi's mother, who was 93 years old, died in the early hours of Friday, 5 April 2024. He ran on the same ticket with Governor AbdulRahman AbdulRazaq on the platform of All Progressives Congress (APC) in the 2019 General elections. Few months after he swore into office, he was appointed by Governor AbdulRahman AbdulRazaq of Kwara State as the head of COVID-19 Technical Committee in Kwara State.

== Background ==
Alabi was born on 1 August 1963 in Oro-Ago, Kwara State, Nigeria. into the family of late Mr Yahaya Samuel Alabi (1925–2007) Oro-Ago in Kwara State, he is the third child of his parents. He has two elder brothers – Femi and Dele – and a younger sister, Modupe. His mother, Mrs Ena Alabi, who was 93 years old, died on 5 January 2024.

== Career ==
- Between 1988 and 1989, Alabi started his career as a part-time lecturer in the Marketing Department of Kaduna Polytechnic.
- From 1987 to 1989, he worked with Beba Consult (Marketing Consultants) in Kaduna State, Nigeria.
- From 1991 to 1996, he worked as a sales representative for Bastone and Firminger, a British trading company in chemicals. Alabi later embarked on integrated marketing consulting services for various organisations and business concerns with his company, the Marketing Concept Limited.
- In the year, 1996, Alabi started private business from. He started a water bottling company in Lagos. He serves as the Chairman of Vantage Heights Nursery and Primary School and Chairman of Little Tots School, both in Lagos. Besides, he also served as the chief executive officer of Bayview Oil and Gas Limited and the chief executive officer of Hot Wings Foods and Investment Limited.

== Personal ==
Alabi is a Christian, married to Abieyuwa Tokunbo Alabi, they have two children.

== See also ==
- List of Yoruba people
