= AbdulRahman AbdulRazaq =

Nigerian politician (born 1960)

His Excellency AbdulRahman AbdulRazaq
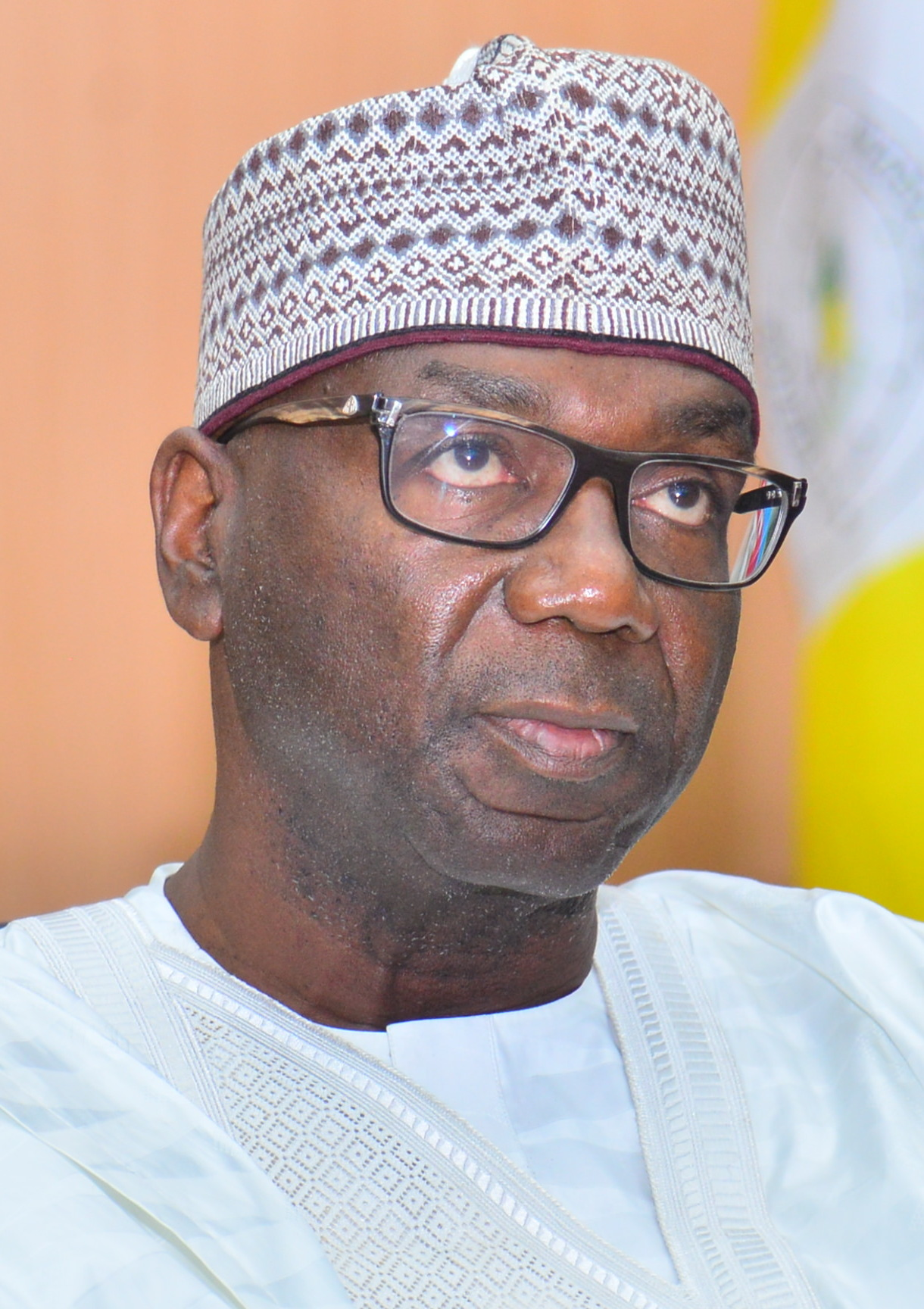

Governor of Kwara State
- Incumbent
- Assumed office 29 May 2019
- Deputy: Kayode Alabi
- Preceded by: Abdulfatah Ahmed

Personal details
- Born: 5 February 1960 (age 66) Zaria, Northern Region, Colonial Nigeria (now in Kaduna State, Nigeria)
- Party: All Progressives Congress (APC)
- Spouse: Olufolake Davies
- Occupation: Politician
- Website: Campaign website

AbdulRahman AbdulRazaq (born 5 February 1960) is a Nigerian politician who has served as governor of Kwara State since 2019.

He was previously the CEO of First Fuels Limited. He contested unsuccessfully the governorship of Kwara State in 2003, 2007 and 2011 respectively under the Congress for Progressive Change political party and was successively defeated by Bukola Saraki in 2003 and 2007, and by Abdulfatah Ahmed in 2011. However, in 2019, he contested again under the ruling political party in Nigeria, the All Progressives Congress, and emerged as the governor of Kwara State, after he won the 2019 governorship election in the state. In 2021, he introduced KwaraLEARN in basic education to empower teachers. By May 2023, during the first anniversary of KwaraLEARN's launch. On 1 August 2023, he and other six governors were in the entourage of president Bola Ahmed Tinubu to Republic of Benin for the country's 63rd independence celebration.

Image of AbdulRahman

== Early life ==
He was born in Kano State. AbdulRahman is the son of Alhaji Abdulganiyu Abdulrasaq SAN, the first northern lawyer in Nigeria.

He attended Capital School, Kaduna between 1966 and 1968; Bishop Smith Memorial School Ilorin between 1970 and 1971; and Government College Kaduna where he is said to have earned his West African Senior School Certificate Examination in 1976 (WASSCE).

== Career ==
=== Politics ===
He entered politics in 1999 when Nigeria returned to democracy. In 2011, he unsuccessfully contested the governorship election in Kwara State on the platform of Congress for Progressive Change (CPC) and again contested unsuccessfully the Kwara Central Senatorial District on the platform of Peoples Democratic Party (PDP) in both 2011 and 2015. He won the gubernatorial primary election of the All Progressives Congress for Kwara State in October 2018.

He was elected as governor of Kwara State at the 2019 governorship election held on 9 March 2019 and sworn in on 29 May 2019. On 19 March 2023, Abdulrahman Abdulrazaq was declared winner and reelected as the governor of Kwara State defeating his closest rival Yaman Abdullahi of the People Democratic Party PDP having scored majority votes in the election.

On 24 May 2023, he emerged as the new Chairman of the Nigeria Governors' Forum at a closed-door meeting of the Governors which was held in Abuja succeeding the former governor of Sokoto State, Aminu Tambuwal, who became the Forum's chairman in 2022, with the governor of Oyo State, Seyi Makinde as the deputy chairman.

=== 2027 Senatorial election Bid ===
The Independent National Electoral Commission (INEC) listed Governor AbdulRahman AbdulRazaq as the candidate for the All Progressives Congress (APC) for the Kwara Central senatorial seat, alongside Senator Saliu Mustapha listed for the Peoples Democratic Party (PDP).

== Personal life ==
He is married to Prof. Olufolake Abdulrazaq (born 2 August 1967), and the couple has three sons.
