= 10th Kwara State House of Assembly =

Kwara state legislatures

- Kwara State House of Assembly

Type
- Type: unicameral
- Term limits: 4 years

History
- Founded: October 2, 1979

Leadership
- Speaker of the Assembly: Rt. Hon. Salihu Yakubu-Danladi, All Progressives Congress (APC) since June 8, 2019
- Deputy Speaker: Hon. Ojo Olayiwola Oyebode, All Progressives Congress, APC since June 8, 2019
- Leader of the House: Hon. Oba Abdulkadir Magaji, All Progressive Congress, APC since June 8, 2019
- Deputy Leader: Hon. Abdulraheem Medinat Motunrayo, All Progressives Congress, APC since June 8, 2019
- Chief Whip: Hon. Abolarin Ganiyu Gabriel, All Progressives Congress, APC
- Minority Leader: Hon, All Progressive Congress (APC) since June 8, 2019
- Deputy Chief Whip: Yusuf Mariam, All Progressive Congress (APC) since June 8, 2019

Structure
- Seats: 24
- Length of term: 4 years

Elections
- Voting system: Direct election
- Last election: June 8, 2019

The 10th Kwara State House of Assembly is the legislative branch of the Kwara State Government inaugurated on June 13, 2023. The assembly will run its course till June 10, 2027. The assembly is unicameral with 24 representatives elected from each constituencies of the state. The incumbent Speaker of the Kwara State House of Assembly of the 9th Legislative Assembly is Rt. Hon Salihu Yakubu-Danladi and the Deputy speaker is Hon. Ojo Olayiwola Oyebode The election of representative for the 9th legislative assembly was held on April 28, 2019.

== Powers and duties ==
The legislative function of the Assembly is to make law by passing bills, which must be endorsed by the two-thirds majority of the house. Following the endorsement by the two-thirds majority, the bill is presented to the Governor, who will sign the bill to become law. The assembly also play a significant role in the appointment of the state commissioners, Chief judges and other top official by the governor.

== Members of the 10th Legislative Assembly ==
1. Rt. Hon. Engr. Yakubu D. Salihu
2. Hon. Oba Abdulkadir Magaji
3. Hon. Yusuf Atoyebi Musa
4. Hon. Abdulraheem Medinat Motunrayo
5. Hon. Owolabi Olatunde Rasaq
6. Hon. Ojo Olayiwola Oyebode
7. Hon. Yusuf Abdulwaheed Gbenga
8. Hon. Yusuf Mariam
9. Hon. Arinola Fatimoh Lawal
10. Hon. Abdullahi Halidu Danbaba
11. Hon. Mohammed Baba Salihu
12. Hon. Ganiyu Folabi Salahu
13. Hon. Shittu Rukayat Motunrayo
14. Hon. Saba Yisa Gideon
15. Hon. Abolarin Ganiyu Gabriel
16. Hon. Omotosho Olakunle Rasaq
17. Hon. Ahmed Saidu Baba
18. Hon. Bello Yinusa Oniboki
19. Hon. Lawal Ayanshola Salihu
20. Hon. Babatunde Ayi Olatundun
21. Hon. Olushola Odetundun
22. Hon. Muhammed Kareem Musa
23. Hon. Otunba Afolabi Taiye
24. Hon. Bamigboye Joseph Olajure
25. Hon. Ogunniyi David Oluwaseun
