= 9th Kwara State House of Assembly =

Kwara state legislatures

- Kwara State House of Assembly

Type
- Type: unicameral
- Term limits: 4 years

History
- Founded: October 2, 1979

Leadership
- Speaker of the Assembly: Rt. Hon. Salihu Yakubu-Danladi, All Progressives Congress (APC) since June 8, 2019
- Deputy Speaker: Hon. Adetiba-Olanrewaju Raphael Olalekan, All Progressives Congress, APC since June 8, 2019
- Leader of the House: Hon. Magaji Abubakar Olawoyin, All Progressive Congress, APC since June 8, 2019
- Deputy Leader: Hon. Bello John Olarewaju, All Progressives Congress, APC since June 8, 2019
- Chief Whip: Hon. Yusuf Atoyebi Musa, All Progressives Congress, APC
- Minority Leader: Hon, All Progressive Congress (APC) since June 8, 2019
- Deputy Chief Whip: Jimoh Ali Yusuf, All Progressive Congress (APC) since June 8, 2019

Structure
- Seats: 24
- Length of term: 4 years

Elections
- Voting system: Direct election
- Last election: June 8, 2019

The 9th Kwara State House of Assembly was the legislative branch of the Kwara State Government from June 10, 2019 to June 10, 2023. The assembly is unicameral with 24 representatives elected from each constituencies of the state. The incumbent Speaker of the Kwara State House of Assembly of the 10th Legislative Assembly is Rt. Hon Salihu Yakubu-Danladi and the Deputy speaker is Hon. Adetiba-Olanrewaju Raphael Olalekan The election of representative for the 9th legislative assembly was held on April 28, 2019.

== Powers and duties ==
The legislative function of the Assembly is to make law by passing bills, which must be endorsed by the two-thirds majority of the house. Following the endorsement by the two-thirds majority, the bill is presented to the Governor, who will sign the bill to become law. The assembly also play a significant role in the appointment of the state commissioners, Chief judges and other top official by the governor.

== Members of the 9th Legislative Assembly ==
1. Rt. Hon. Engr. Yakubu D. Salihu
2. Hon. Adetiba-Olanrewaju Raphael Olalekan
3. Hon. Magaji Abubakar Olawoyin
4. Hon. Bello John Olarewaju Olarewaju
5. Hon. Yusuf Atoyebi Musa
6. Hon. Jimoh Ali Yusuf
7. Hon. Owolabi Olatunde Rasaq
8. Hon. Abdulkareem Babatunde Paku
9. Hon. Aliyu Wahab Opakunle
10. Hon. Abdulgafar Olayemi Ayinla
11. Hon. Awodiji Omotayo Felix
12. Hon. Ojo Olayiwola Oyebode
13. Hon. Yusuf Abdulwaheed Gbenga
14. Hon. Ahmed Saidu Baba
15. Hon. Awolola Olumide Ayokunle
16. Hon. Abdullahi Halidu Danbaba
17. Hon. Mohammed Baba Salihu
18. Hon. Ganiyu Folabi Salahu
19. Hon. Ndamusa M, Guyegi
20. Hon. Ambali Olatunji Ibrahim
21. Hon. Popoola Saheed Adekeye Lekan
22. Hon. Abolarin Ganiyu Gabriel
23. Hon. Ahmed Rufai Adam
24. Hon. Jimoh Raheem Agboola
