= 8th Kwara State House of Assembly =

Kwara state legislatures

- Kwara State House of Assembly

Type
- Type: unicameral
- Term limits: 4 years

History
- Founded: October 2, 1979

Leadership
- Speaker of the Assembly: Rt. Hon. Ali Ahmad, All Progressives Congress (APC) since June 8, 2015
- Deputy Speaker: Okedare Matthew, People's Democratic Party, PDP since June 8, 2015
- Leader of the House: Hon. Hassan Oyeleke, People's Democratic Party (Nigeria), PDP since June 8, 2015
- Deputy Leader: Hon. Abdulkadir Segilola Ramat, All Progressives Congress, APC since June 8, 2015
- Chief Whip: Hon. Umar Mohammed Gunu, People's Democratic Party, PDP
- Minority Leader: Hon, Peoples Democratic party (PDP) since June 8, 2015
- Deputy Chief Whip: Felicia Ebun Owolabi , People's Democratic Party (PDP) since June 8, 2015

Structure
- Seats: 24
- Length of term: 4 years

Elections
- Voting system: Direct election
- Last election: June 8, 2015

The 8th Kwara State House of Assembly is the legislative branch of the Kwara State Government inaugurated on June 8, 2015. The assembly ran its course till June 3, 2019. The assembly is unicameral with 24 representatives elected from each constituencies of the state. The incumbent Speaker of the Kwara State House of Assembly of the 8th Legislative Assembly is Rt. Hon Ali Ahmad (lawyer) and the Deputy speaker is Hon. Okedare Matthew. The election of representative for the 8th legislative assembly was held on April 28, 2015.

== Powers and duties ==
The legislative function of the Assembly is to make law by passing bills, which must be endorsed by the two-thirds majority of the house. Following the endorsement by the two-thirds majority, the bill is presented to the Governor, who will sign the bill to become law. The assembly also play a significant role in the appointment of the state commissioners, Chief judges and other top official by the governor.

== Members of the 8th Legislative Assembly ==
1. Rt. Hon Ali Ahmad (lawyer)
2. Hon. Okedare Matthew
3. Hon. Hassan Oyeleke
4. Umar Mohammed Gunu
5. Felicia Ebun Owolabi
6. Abdulkadir Segilola Ramat
7. Jimoh Akanni Abdulraman
8. Ibrahim Aishat Bodunrin
9. Amosa Mohammed Mobolaji
10. Shuaib Ahmed Abdulkadir
11. Babaoye Olaitan Matthew
12. Afolayan Musa Moses
13. Adebayo Babatunde Mohammed
14. Muhammed Ba'Aziki Suleiman
15. Emmanuel Folorunsho Abodunrin
16. Abdulrafiu Abdulrahman
17. Adamu Usman
18. Moshood Olanrewaju Bakare
19. Adams Aliyu Ishiaku
20. Ahmed Ibn Mohammed
21. Abdullahi Taiwo Abdulrasheed
22. Popoola Saheed Adekeye
23. Sikirat Anako
24. Kamal Oyekunle Fagbemi
