= Bello Yinusa Oniboki =

Nigerian politician

The Honourable Bello Yinusa Oniboki

Member of the Kwara State House of Assembly from Asa Local Government
- Constituency: Afon

Personal details
- Born: 7 June 1968 (age 58) Budo-Egba, Asa Local Government Kwara State Nigeria
- Party: All Progressive Congress
- Education: Kwara State Polytechnic
- Alma mater: Kwara State University
- Occupation: Politician

Bello Yinusa Oniboki Pronounciation is a Nigerian academician and politician representing the Afon constituency, Asa local government area in the Kwara State House of Assembly at the 10th Assembly.

== Early life and education ==
Bello was born on 7 June 1968 in Budo-Egba, Asa Local Government Area of Kwara State, Nigeria. Between 1976 and 1981, he attended Otte L.S.M.B. school for his First School Leaving Certificate and obtained his General Certificate of Examination (GCE) in 1990. He studied Public Administration at Kwara State Polytechnic to obtain his Ordinary National Diploma, Higher National Diploma, and postgraduate diploma in 2000, 2005, and 2008 respectively. He also studied Business Administration at Kwara State University to obtain his bachelor's degree in 2017 and his master's degree in Business Administration in 2023.

== Career ==
Bello is an academician and politician he was a staff member of Kwara State Polytechnic. He worked as a registry staff at the Kwara State Polytechnic from 2008 to 2022. During this period, he was deployed to different departments, including the Institute of Basic and Applied Science (IBAS) from 2008 to 2011, the Electrical/Electronic Department, Institute of Technology from 2011 to 2015, and the Institute Secretary Office, Institute of Technology from 2015 to 2022.

Between 1991 and 1993, Honourable Bello was elected as a Councilor, representing Budo-Egba Ward in Asa Local Government Area of Kwara State. He also served as a Member of the Local Government Creation Committee, Asa local government authority, in 2004, and as a Board member of the Kwara State Agency for Mass Literacy from 2001 to 2002. Furthermore, he was elected as a member of the Kwara State House of Assembly, representing Afon constituency during the 2023 general election at the 10th Assembly.
