= Speaker of the Kwara State House of Assembly =

Presiding officer of the Kwara State House of Assembly, Nigeria

- Incumbent; Salihu Yakubu-Danladi since 11 June 2019
- Legislative Branch of the Kwara State Government
- Style: Mr/Madam Speaker (informal); The Right Honourable (formal)
- Member of: Kwara State House of Assembly
- Seat: Kwara State House of Assembly, Ilorin
- Appointer: Indirect House Election
- Term length: 4 years renewable
- Constituting instrument: Constitution of Nigeria
- Formation: 2 October 1979; 46 years ago
- First holder: Hon
- Succession: Second
- Deputy: Deputy Speaker of the Kwara State House of Assembly

The speaker of the Kwara State House of Assembly is the presiding officer of the Kwara State House of Assembly, elected by its membership. The Speaker is second in line of succession to the Kwara State governorship, after the deputy governor. The Speaker also represents the members of his or her constituency. Since inauguration of the state house of assembly on 2 October 1979, there have been 10 legislative assemblies with 8 representatives holding the office of Speaker.The current Speaker is Salihu Yakubu-Danladi who was elected on 11 June 2019.

== List of Speakers ==
Source: Kwara State House of Assembly

Name	Took office	Left office	Party	Assembly
Ali Ahmad (lawyer)	8 June 2015	7 June 2019	PDP	8th
Salihu Yakubu-Danladi	11 June 2015	Present	APC	10th

=== List of Deputy Speakers ===
Name	Took office	Left office	Party	Assembly
Mohammed Gana Yisa	8 June 2015	7 June 2019	PDP	8th
Ojo Olayiwola Oyebode	11 June 2015	Present	APC	10th
