= Lawal Ayanshola Salihu =

Nigerian politician (born 1981)

The Honourable Lawal Ayanshola Salihu

Member of the Kwara State House of Assembly
- Incumbent
- Assumed office 18 March 2023

Member of the Kwara State House of Assembly from Moro Local Government
- Incumbent
- Assumed office 18 March 2023
- Constituency: Oloru/Malete/Ipaiye

Personal details
- Born: 1 September 1980 (age 46) Elega Oju-Oja, Moro Local Government Kwara State Nigeria
- Party: All Progressive Congress
- Education: Kwara State Polytechnic
- Occupation: Politician; Procurement Officer

Lawal Ayanshola Salihu is a Nigerian procurement officer and a politician representing the Oloru/Malete/Ipaiye constituency, Moro local government area in the Kwara State 10th Assembly at Kwara State House of Assembly.

== Early life and education ==
Lawal was born on 1 September 1980 in Elega Oju-Oja, Moro Local Government area of Kwara State. He obtained his Senior Secondary School Certificate in Awoga High School, Shao, Kwara State Nigeria. He studied Purchasing and Supply at Kwara State Polytechnic for his Ordinary National Diploma and Higher National Diploma in 2003 and 2006 respectively.

== Career ==
Between 2008 and 2010, Lawal served as a Purchasing Assistant at Costain West Africa Plc. He then worked as a procurement officer.at Haulage from 2010 to 2017. Subsequently, Lawal transitioned into politics and was elected as a member of the 10th Assembly in Kwara State, representing Oloru/Malete/Ipaiye constituency, under the All Progressive Congress platform in the 2023 general election.
