= Olakunle =

Olakunle may refer to:

== People ==
=== First name ===
- Olakunle Churchill, Nigerian businessmen and philanthropist
- Olakunle Dada-Luke (born 2000), Canadian professional soccer player
- Olakunle Fatukasi (born 1999), American professional footballer linebacker
- Olakunle George, Nigerian academic
- Olakunle Oluomo (born 1963), Nigerian politician
- Olakunle Olusegun (born 2002), Nigerian professional footballer

=== Middle name ===
- Omotosho Olakunle Rasaq, Nigerian politician
- Pius Olakunle Osunyikanmi, former Director General of Nigerian Technical Aid Corps

=== Last name ===
- James Olakunle (born 1947), Nigerian sprinter
