= Abdulraheem Medinat Motunrayo =

Nigerian politician (born 1990)

The Honourable Abdulraheem Medinat Motunrayo

Dupty House Leader Kwara State House of Assembly
- Incumbent
- Assumed office 18 March 2023

Member of the Kwara State House of Assembly from Moro,Moro Local Government
- Incumbent
- Assumed office 18 March 2023
- Constituency: Lanwa/ Ejidongari

Personal details
- Born: 19 February 1990 (age 36) Moro, Moro Local Government Kwara State Nigeria
- Party: All Progressive Congress
- Education: Kwara State Polytechnic
- Alma mater: Kwara State Polytechnic
- Occupation: Politician; Public Administrator

Abdulraheem Medinat Motunrayo is a Nigerian public administrator and politician representing the Lanwa/Ejidongari constituency, Moro local government area in the Kwara State and the 10th Dupty House Leader of the Kwara State House of Assembly.

== Early life and education ==
Medinat was born on 19 February 1990 in Moro, Moro Local Government area of Kwara State Nigeria. She studied Public Administration at Kwara State Polytechnic where she earned her National Diploma and Higher National Diploma in 2009 and 2012 respectively.

== Career ==
Medinat, is a Public Administrator and teacher before joining politics she contested and won the ticket to represent Lanwa / Ejidongari constituency in the Kwara State House of Assembly under the All Progressive Congress.
