= Ibrahim Aishat Bodunrin =

Nigerian politician (born 1977)

The Honourable Ibrahim Aishat Bodunrin

Member of the Kwara State House of Assembly from Ilorin East Local Government
- Constituency: Ilorin East

Personal details
- Born: 2 January 1965 (age 61) Ilorin,Ilorin East Local Government Kwara State Nigeria
- Party: All Progressive Congress
- Education: Kwara State Polytechnic
- Occupation: Politician

Ibrahim Aishat Bodunrin (born 2 January 1965) was born in Ilorin, the state capital of Kwara State, is a Nigerian Politician and member of the 8th Kwara State House of Assembly representing Ilorin-east constituency the Kwara State House of Assembly. She sponsored a Bill to establish the Office for Disability Affairs during her term at the state assembly.
