= Bamigboye Joseph Olajure =

Nigerian politician

The Honourable Bamigboye Joseph Olajure

Member of the Kwara State House of Assembly
- Incumbent
- Assumed office 18 March 2023

Member of the Kwara State House of Assembly from Oke-ero Local Government
- Incumbent
- Assumed office 18 March 2023
- Constituency: Oke-ero constituency

Personal details
- Born: 1 February 1965 (age 61) Odo owo,Oke-ero Local Government Kwara State Nigeria
- Party: All Progressive Congress
- Education: National Open University
- Alma mater: Osun State College of Technology
- Occupation: Politician; Project Manager; Administrator

Bamigboye Joseph Olajure (born 1 January 1965) is a Nigerian politician representing the Oke-ero constituency, Oke Ero local government area in the 10th Assembly of the Kwara State House of Assembly.

== Early life and education ==
Bamigboye was born on 1 January 1965 in Odo owo Oke-Ero Local Government Area of Kwara State Nigeria and attended Osun State College of Technology, Esa Oke, where he obtained his Ordinary National Diploma and Higher National Diploma in Banking and Finance and obtained his MBA at National Open University in year 2012.

== Career ==
Bamigboye is a Nigerian politician and the chairman House Committee on Establishment and Public Service and the Deputy Chairman on House Committee on Land, Housing and Urban Development he was elected at the Honourable member at the Kwara State House of Assembly representing the Oke-ero constituency during the 2023 general election.
