= Ogunniyi David Oluwaseun =

Nigerian politician (born 1977)

The Honourable Ogunniyi David Oluwaseun

Member of the Kwara State House of Assembly
- Incumbent
- Assumed office 18 March 2023

Member of the Kwara State House of Assembly from Offa Local Government
- Incumbent
- Assumed office 18 March 2023
- Constituency: Ojomu/Balogun

Personal details
- Born: 24 July 1977 (age 49) Offa,Offa Local Government Kwara State Nigeria
- Party: All Progressive Congress
- Education: Kwara State Polytechnic, Afe Babalola University
- Alma mater: Covenant University
- Occupation: Politician; Project Manager; Administrator; Computer Scientist

Ogunniyi David Oluwaseun is a Nigerian administrator and politician representing the Ojomu/Balogun constituency, Offa local government area in the Kwara State House of Assembly.

== Early life and education ==
Ogunniyi was born on 24 June 1977 in Offa, Offa Local Government Area of Kwara State Nigeria. He studied computer science at Kwara State Polytechnic, where he earned his Higher National Diploma. He later earned his bachelor's degree from Covenant University Otta, Ogun State where he pursued undergraduate studies in Policy and Strategic Studies, followed by a Master's degree in Conflict, Peace, and Strategic Studies from Afe Babalola University, Ado-Ekiti, Ekiti State.

== Career ==
Ogunniyi is a computer scientist and administrator who joined politics, previously serving as Country Managing Director and West Africa Regional Leader of a Fortune 500 American conglomerate. Prior to his election as a member of the 10th Assembly in Kwara State under the All Progressive Congress platform in the 2023 general election.
