= Arinola Fatimoh Lawal =

Nigerian politician (born 1969)

The Honourable Arinola Fatimoh Lawal

Member of the Kwara State House of Assembly
- Incumbent
- Assumed office 18 March 2023

Member of the Kwara State House of Assembly from Idi-Ape, Ilorin East Local Government
- Incumbent
- Assumed office 18 March 2023
- Constituency: Ilorin East Constituency

Personal details
- Born: 26 October 1969 (age 57) Idi-Ape, Ilorin East Local Government Kwara State Nigeria
- Party: All Progressive Congress
- Education: Kwara State Polytechnic
- Alma mater: Kwara State Polytechnic
- Occupation: Politician; Administrator

Arinola Fatimoh Lawal is a Nigerian politician representing the Ilorin east constituency, Ilorin east local government area in the 10th Assembly at Kwara State House of Assembly.

== Early life and education ==
Arinola was born on 26 October 1969 in Idi-Ape, Ilorin East Local Government areas Kwara State Nigeria. She obtained her West African School Certificate at Queens College Ilorin in 1986. She studied Catering and Hotel Management at Kwara State Polytechnic to earned her both National Diploma and Higher National Diploma in 1988 and 1993 respectively.

== Career ==
Arinola has served in many private firms including Mohbalamira Nigeria Limited, Abuja where she recently served as the Chief executive officer prior to her appointment as the commissioner in 2019 for the Ministry of Water Resources to the executive governor of Kwara State. In 2021, she was appointed as the commissioner for Business, Innovation and Technology by His Excellency Governor AbdulRahman AbdulRazaq. In 2023, she contested and won ticket under the platform of All Progressive Congress as State assembly member that represent Ilorin East constituency in the 10th Assembly.
