= Abolarin Ganiyu Gabriel =

Nigerian politician (born 1976)

The Honourable Abolarin Ganiyu Gabriel

Member of the Kwara State House of Assembly
- Incumbent
- Assumed office 18 March 2023

Member of the Kwara State House of Assembly from Odo-Itan, Ekiti Local Government
- Incumbent
- Assumed office 18 March 2023
- Constituency: Ekiti Constituency

Personal details
- Born: 23 March 1976 (age 50) Odo-Itan, Ekiti Local Government Kwara State Nigeria
- Party: All Progressive Congress
- Education: Federal Polytechnic, Offa
- Alma mater: Federal Polytechnic, Offa
- Occupation: Politician; Accountant

Abolarin Ganiyu Gabriel is a Nigerian farmer and politician representing the Ekiti constituency, Ekiti local government area in the Kwara State House of Assembly at 9th and 10th Assembly.

== Early life and education ==
Abolarin was born on 23 March 1976 in Odo-Itan, Ekiti Local Government area Kwara State Nigeria. He studied accounting at Federal Polytechnic, Offa for his National Diploma and Kwara State Polytechnic for his Higher National Diploma in the same field which he completed in 2011.

== Career ==
Abolarin is an experienced businessman in farm produce buying and selling, specializing in cocoa. Prior to his transition into politics, he held the position of Produce Officer at Akinniyi Produce Nigeria Ltd. in Idanre, Ondo State, from 1997 to 2002. In 2019, he contested and won an election as a member of the 9th Assembly in Kwara State under the All Progressive Congress platform and won his re-election bid in the 2023 general election to represent Ekiti Constituency in the 10th Assembly at Kwara State House of Assembly.
