= Jimoh Ali Yusuf =

Nigerian politician (born 1979)

The Honourable Jimoh Ali Yusuf

Member of the Kwara State House of Assembly
- Incumbent
- Assumed office 18 March 2023

Member of the Kwara State House of Assembly from Ilorin, Ilorin East Local Government
- Incumbent
- Assumed office 18 March 2023
- Constituency: Ilorin East Constituency

Personal details
- Born: 1 March 1979 (age 47) Ilorin, Ilorin East Local Government Kwara State Nigeria
- Party: All Progressive Congress
- Education: Kwara State Polytechnic
- Alma mater: Kwara State Polytechnic
- Occupation: Politician; Accountant

Jimoh Ali Yusuf is a Nigerian accountant and politician representing the Ilorin east constituency, Ilorin-east government area in the Kwara State House of Assembly and the 9th deputy whip.

== Early life and education ==
Jimoh was born on 1 March 1979 in Ilorin in Ilorin east local government of Kwara State. He attended Kwara State Polytechnic for his National Diploma and Higher National Diploma in accounting.

== Career ==
Jimoh is a practising accountant, he previously served as the Manager, LilifiedAntob Nig. Ltd and payment voucher officer, in Ondo State prior to his election as the state assembly member that represents the Ilorin east constituency at the Kwara State House of Assembly in the 9th Assembly where he served as the deputy house whip.
