= Motunrayo =

Motúnráyọ̀
- Gender: Feminine
- Language: Yoruba

Origin
- Language: Nigeria
- Meaning: I see joy again
- Region of origin: Southwest

Other names
- Short form: Túnráyọ̀ | Ráyọ̀

Motúnráyọ̀ audio is a female Yoruba name from the Southwestern region of Nigeria. It means "I see joy again" This name is usually given to a child given birth to after a family has gone through a bad event like the death of a child or family member.

== Notable people bearing the name ==
- Motunrayo Alaka, Nigerian activist
- Rukayat Motunrayo Shittu, Nigerian journalist and politician
