= Yusuf Atoyebi Musa =

Nigerian politician (born 1976)

The Honourable Yusuf Atoyebi Musa

Chief Whip Kwara State House of Assembly
- In office 18 March 2019 – 18 March 2023

Member, Kwara State House of Assembly from Oyun Local Government
- Incumbent
- Assumed office 18 March 2019
- Constituency: Odo-Ogun

Personal details
- Born: 26 October 1976 (age 50) Ilemona, Oyun Local Government Kwara State Nigeria
- Party: All Progressive Congress
- Education: Federal Polytechnic, Offa
- Alma mater: Federal Polytechnic, Offa
- Occupation: Politician; Administrator

Yusuf Atoyebi Musa is a Nigerian politician representing the Odo-Ogun constituency, Oyun local government area in the 9th and 10th Assembly, he served as the chief whip of the 9th Assembly of the Kwara State House of Assembly between 2019 and 2023.

== Early life and education ==
Atoyebi was born on 26 July 1976 in Ilemona, Oyun Local Government Area of Kwara State, Nigeria, within the Oke-Ogun Constituency. He pursued his academic interests in financial studies and accountancy, earning both his Ordinary National Diploma and Higher National Diploma from the Federal Polytechnic, Offa.

== Career ==
Atoyebi is a politician he was elected as a councillor representing Ilemona ward at the local council, serving from 2007 to 2013. Prior to his appointment as the supervisory councillor for works in Oyun Local Government Area, a position he held from November 2017 to May 2018.

In 2019, Atoyebi contested for the post of Kwara State House of Assembly members under the All Progressives Congress platform and was elected as the 9th Assembly chief whip. He won his re-election bid during the 2023 general election, making him serve concurrently in both the 9th and 10th Assemblies.
