= Aliyu Wahab Opakunle =

Nigerian Politician

Member of the Kwara State House of Assembly

Member of the U.S. House of Representatives from Kwara State
- Constituency: Afon

Chairman, House Committee on Local Government and Chieftaincy Affairs

Personal details
- Born: April 12, 1964 (age 62) Foko-Oja, Asa, Kwara State, Nigeria
- Party: All Progressives Congress
- Education: Kwara State Polytechnic; Ahmadu Bello University
- Occupation: Politician

Aliyu Wahab Opakunle is a Nigerian Politician and member of the 8th Kwara State House of Assembly representing the Afon constituency, Asa local government area in the Kwara State House of Assembly.

== Early life and education ==
Aliyu was born on 12 April, 1964 in Foko-Oja, Asa Local Government Area of Kwara State Nigeria. He attended Kwara State Polytechnic to studied Salesmanship and held his bachelor's degree in Business Administration from Ahmadu Bello University, Zaria.

== Career ==
Aliyu previously served as manager at Onward Fisheries and revenue Officer under Kwara State ministry of finance before joining politics he was elected to serve in the 9th Assembly under the platform of All Progressive Congress where he served as the Chairman, House Committee on Local Government and Chieftaincy Affairs.
