= Adamu Usman =

Nigerian politician (born 1978)

The Honourable Adamu Usman

Member of the Kwara State House of Assembly
- In office 18 March 2015 – 18 March 2019

Member of the Kwara State House of Assembly from Kaiama Local Government
- In office 18 March 2015 – 18 March 2019
- Constituency: Okuta/Yashikira

Personal details
- Born: 4 April 1978 (age 48) Okuta,Kaiama Local Government Kwara State Nigeria
- Party: People's Democratic Party (Nigeria)
- Education
- Occupation: Politician

Adamu Usman (born April 4, 1978) is a Nigerian Politician and member of the 8th Assembly representing Okuta/Yashikira constituency at the Kwara State House of Assembly.
