= Gunu =

Gunu may refer to:

- Abdul-Samed Muhamed Gunu (born 1966), Ghanaian politician
- Gunu language, spoken in Cameroon
- Sherifa Gunu, Ghanaian musician
- Umar Mohammed Gunu (born 1954), Nigerian Politician
