= Olaitan =

- Gender: Male/Female
- Language: Yoruba

Origin
- Meaning: Wealth is inexhaustible, Wealth will never come to an end
- Region of origin: South west Nigeria

Ọláìtán (Yoruba: [ɔ̄láìtã́]; diminutive form of Ọlákìítán) is both a surname and a unisex given name of Yoruba origin meaning "wealth is inexhaustible" or "wealth will never come to an end”.

== Notable people with the name include ==
- Babaoye Olaitan Matthew (born 1968), Nigerian Politician
- Eniola Olaitan Ajayi (born 1965), Nigerian politician and diplomat
- Ikuforiji Olaitan Abdulrahman (born 1997), Nigerian singer and songwriter
- Joseph Olaitan Adenuga Jr., (born 1982), British-Nigerian grime MC, rapper and record producer
- Junior Olaitan (born 2002), Beninese footballer
- Micheal Olaitan Oyeneye (born 1993), Nigerian footballer
- Olaitan Ibrahim (born 1986), Nigerian Paralympic power-lifter
- Oladapo Olaitan Olaonipekun (1984–2010), Nigerian Rapper
- Olaitan Soyannwo, Nigerian professor
- Olaitan Yusuf (born 1982), Nigerian women's international footballer
