= Higher Nationals =

Internationally-recognised higher education programme of qualifications

Higher Nationals are a suite of internationally recognised higher education qualifications at level 4 (HNC) and 5 (HND) that are equivalent to the first and second years of a university bachelor's degree, providing progression to over 95% of UK universities including the University of Oxford at an advanced level (admission to either Year 2 or Year 3 of a bachelor's degree).

They were first introduced in England and Wales in 1920 alongside the Ordinary National Diploma.

In Great Britain and Northern Ireland, Higher Nationals may either be awarded by British degree-awarding bodies under approved licence from Pearson (which allows the Universities to devise, deliver and award Higher Nationals themselves), or they may be awarded directly by Pearson, as an awarding body regulated by Ofqual. In Scotland, Higher Nationals are awarded by the Scottish Qualifications Authority (SQA).

Higher Nationals are also delivered at both universities and further education colleges in 60 countries around the world through HN Global.

The Higher Nationals suite of qualifications are split into two parts, with students within their first year of study pursuing a Higher National Certificate (HNC is a separate qualification and is not required for a Higher National Diploma award, although it still encompasses the first year content). In the second year of study, students pursue the HND which is generally more extensive and academically rigorous than the HNC.

Higher Nationals are graded, usually based on a weighted average (with higher weight given to marks in the final year of the course, and often zero weight to those in the first year) of the marks gained in exams and other assessments. Grade boundaries may vary by institution, but usually follow the boundaries given below:

- Distinction – typically 70% and higher
- Merit – typically 60-69%
- Pass – typically 40-59%.
