= Jimoh Akanni Abdulraman =

Nigerian politician

Member of the Kwara State House of Assembly
- In office Member of the 8th Assembly
- Constituency: Share/Oke-Ode

Personal details
- Born: March 27, 1957 (age 69)
- Occupation: Politician

Jimoh Akanni Abdulraman (born March 27, 1957) is a Politician and member of the 8th Kwara State House of Assembly representing Share/Oke-Ode constituency the Kwara State House of Assembly where he served as the chairman committee on Education and Human and Capital Development.
