= Shoaib =

Shoaib (Urdu: شعیب) is a masculine given name and surname of Arabic origin derived from the name Shuaib. It is most prevalent in Pakistan. Notable people with the name include:

== Given name ==
=== Shoaib ===
- Shoaib Abbasi (born 1956), Pakistani-American business executive
- Shoaib Khan Afridi, Pakistani politician
- Shoaib Ahmed (businessman) (1964–2026), Indian entrepreneur
- Shoaib Ahmed (Indian cricketer) (born 1987), Indian cricketer
- Shoaib Ahmed (Pakistani cricketer) (born 1990), Pakistani cricketer
- Shoaib Akhtar (born 1975), Pakistani cricketer
- Shoaib Akhtar (cricketer, born 1982) (born 1982), Pakistani cricketer
- Shoaib Ameer, Pakistani politician
- Shoaib Bashir (born 2003), English cricketer
- Shoaib Ali Bukhari, Bangladeshi cricket fan
- Shoaib Hashmi (born 1995), Pakistani playwright and actor
- Shoaib Ibrahim (born 1987), Indian television actor
- Shoaib Iqbal (born 1958), Indian politician
- Shoaib Khaliq (born 1991), Pakistani cricketer
- Shoaib Khan (cricketer, born 1978) (born 1978), Pakistani cricketer
- Shoaib Khan (cricketer, born 1985) (born 1985), Pakistani cricketer
- Shoaib Khan (cricketer, born 1992) (born 1992), Indian cricketer
- Shoaib Md Khan (born 1991), Indian cricketer
- Shoaib Sultan Khan (born 1933), Pakistani social worker
- Shoaib Laghari (born 1986), Pakistani cricketer
- Shoaib Malik (born 1982), Pakistani cricketer
- Shoaib Ahmed Malik, British academic
- Shoaib Mansoor (born 1952), Pakistani television and film director
- Shoaib Mir Memon, Pakistani civil servant
- Shoaib Mohammad (born 1961), Pakistani cricketer
- Shoaib Nasir (born 1983), Pakistani cricketer
- Shoaib Sarwar (born 1986), Emirati cricketer
- Shoaib Shaikh (born 1987), Indian cricketer
- Shoaib Ahmed Shaikh (born 1971), Pakistani fraudster
- Shoaib Sultan (born 1973), Norwegian analyst and politician of Pakistani descent
- Shoaib Tauheed (1960–2007), Pakistani physiologist
- Muhammad Shoaib Siddiqui (born 1969), Pakistani politician

=== Shuaib ===
- Shuaib-Mulla of Tsentara (1804–1844), Chechen commander and naib of the Caucasian Imamate
- Shuaib Ahmed Abdulkadir (born 1966), Nigerian politician
- Shuaib Oba Abdulraheem (born 1948), Nigerian academic
- Shuaib Adam (born 1953), Kenyan sport shooter
- Shuaib Lazim (1938–2023), Malaysian politician, businessman, and teacher
- Shuaib Al-Muwaizri (born 1959), Kuwaiti politician
- Shuaib Qureshi (1892–1962), Pakistani diplomat, politician, journalist, and lawyer

=== Shu'ayb ===
- Shu'ayb ibn Ahmad, Emir of Crete
- Shu'ayb al-Arna'ut (1928–2016), Albanian scholar of Hadith
- Shu'ba ibn al-Hajjaj (704–776), Arab Hadith scholar
- Shu'ayb ibn Khazim, Abbasid governor of Damascus
- Shu'ayb ibn Umar, Emir of Crete

== Surname ==
- Muhammad Shoaib (1907–1997), Pakistani politician
- Samia Shoaib (born 1983), Pakistani-British actress, filmmaker, and writer
