= Saba Yisa Gideon =

Nigerian politician (born 1986)

The Honourable Saba Yisa Gideon

Member of the Kwara State House of Assembly
- Incumbent
- Assumed office 18 March 2023

Member of the Kwara State House of Assembly from Edu Local Government
- Constituency: Lafiagi/Edu

Personal details
- Born: 8 May 1986 (age 40) Tsaragi,Edu Local Government Kwara State Nigeria
- Party: All Progressive Congress
- Education: Ahmadu Bello University
- Occupation: Politician

Saba Yisa Gideon (born 5 August 1986) is a Nigerian politician representing the Lafiagi/Edu constituency, Edu local government area in the Kwara State House of Assembly.

== Early life and education ==
Saba was born in Tsaragi, Edu Local Government area of Kwara State on 5 August 1986. He attended the College of Education, Kotangora, Niger State, where he earned his National Certificate in Education (NCE) in Agricultural Education in 2009. In 2013, he obtained his Higher National Diploma (HND) in Agricultural Extension and Management from Niger State College of Agriculture, Mokwa Niger State.

== Career ==
Saba previously served as the Managing Director at Grace Land Farm and Agricultural Farm Produce in 2009. Between 2021 and 2023, he was appointed as a Commissioner for Agriculture and Natural Resources. Following the February general election, he was elected as a state house of assembly member in the 10th Assembly, where he serves as the Chairman of the House Committee on Agriculture and Natural Resources.
