= Bello John Olarewaju =

Nigerian politician (born 1960)

The Honourable Bello John Olarewaju

Deputy House Leader Kwara State House of Assembly
- In office 18 March 2019 – 18 March 2023

Member of the Kwara State House of Assembly from Moro Local Government
- Incumbent
- Assumed office 18 March 2023
- Constituency: Lanwa/Ejidongari

Personal details
- Born: 19 July 1960 (age 65) Onipako-Jebba, Moro Local Government Kwara State Nigeria
- Party: All Progressive Congress
- Education: College of Education, Oro
- Alma mater: University of Ado Ekiti
- Occupation: Politician; Administrator

Bello John Olarewaju is a Nigerian politician representing the Lanwa/Ejidongari constituency, Moro local government area in the Kwara State House of Assembly and the 9th Deputy House Leader.

== Early life and education ==
Bello was born on 19 July 1960 in Onipako-Jebba, Moro Local Government Area of Kwara State, Nigeria. He attended Government Secondary School, Malete, before proceeding to Kwara State College of Education, Oro, where he studied Mathematics Education. He further pursued his academic interests by obtaining a Bachelor's degree in Mathematics Education from the Ekiti State University.

== Career ==
Bello has previously served as a supervisor at the Nigeria Paper Mill and Sugar Company in Bacita, and as a manager at the Power Holding Company of Nigeria. He was elected as a councilor representing Jebba Ward from 1996 to 1997. In 2019, he won the ticket under the All Progressives Congress platform to become a state assembly member. He contested and won the 2019 general election, becoming a member of the 9th Assembly.
