= Abdulkareem Babatunde Paku =

Nigerian politician

The Honourable Abdulkareem Babatunde Paku

Member of the Kwara State House of Assembly

Personal details
- Born: 14 June 1966 (age 60) Paku, Moro, Nigeria
- Party: People's Democratic Party (Nigeria)
- Education: Ekiti State University; Kwara State College of Education, Ilorin
- Occupation: Politician

Abdulkareem Babatunde Paku (born 14 June 1966) is a Nigerian politician representing the Ipaye/Malete/Oloru constituency, Moro local government area in the Kwara State House of Assembly.

== Early life and education ==
Abdulkareem was born on 14 June 1966 in Paku, Moro Local Government area of Kwara State Nigeria. He attended Kwara State College of Education, Ilorin to obtained his National Certificate on Education and University of Ado Ekiti for his bachelor's degree.

== Career ==
Abdulkareem is a trained teacher and politician. He is currently the Chairman of the House Committee on Commerce, Cooperatives, Industry & Women Affairs at the 9th Assembly of Kwara State and previously served as the Supervisory Councilor for Education, Moro Local Government area of Kwara State.
