= Adebayo Babatunde Mohammed =

Nigerian politician (born 1949)

The Honourable Adebayo Babatunde Mohammed

Member of the Kwara State House of Assembly
- In office 18 March 2015 – 18 March 2019

Member of the Kwara State House of Assembly from Moro Local Government
- In office 18 March 2015 – 18 March 2019
- Constituency: Ipaye/Malete/Oloru

Personal details
- Born: 3 January 1959 (age 67) Malete,Moro Local Government Kwara State Nigeria
- Party: People's Democratic Party (Nigeria)
- Education
- Occupation: Politician

Adebayo Babatunde Mohammed (born 3 January 1959) is a Nigerian Politician and member of the 8th Kwara State House of Assemblyrepresenting Ipaye/Malete/Oloru constituency the Kwara State House of Assembly.
