= Oba Abdulkadir Magaji =

Nigerian politician (born 1969)

The Honourable Oba Abdulkadir Magaji

Member of the Kwara State House of Assembly
- Incumbent
- Assumed office 18 March 2023

Member of the Kwara State House of Assembly from Ilorin,Ilorin West Local Government
- Incumbent
- Assumed office 18 March 2023
- Constituency: Ilorin Central Constituency

Personal details
- Born: 15 March 1969 (age 57) Magajin Geri’s,Ilorin West Local Government Kwara State Nigeria
- Party: All Progressive Congress
- Education: Kwara State Polytechnic
- Alma mater: Ahmadu Bello University
- Occupation: Politician; Project Manager; Legal Practitioner
- Profession: Legal Practitioner

Oba Abdulkadir Magaji (born March 1969) is a Nigerian legal practitioner and politician representing the Ilorin central constituency, Ilorin central local government area in the 10th Assembly of the Kwara State House of Assembly.

== Early life and education ==
Magaji was born on 15 March 1969 in Magajin Geri’s Compound of Ilorin West Local Government of Kwara State. He studied at Kwara State Polytechnic, Ilorin, between 1989 and 1991, where he earned a Diploma in Law. He later obtained his first law degree with honors from Ahmadu Bello University, Zaria, in 1998 and was called to the Nigerian Bar in 2000.

== Career ==
Magaji began his career as a legal practitioner and is the managing partner of Magajin Geri & Co Law Firm, where he serves as the principal partner. He joined active politics in February 2023, following the demise of his brother, who was the 9th state assembly member under the All Progressive Congress platform. Magaji contested and won the state assembly election, becoming the 10th Assembly member.
