= Abdulrasheed =

Abdulrasheed may refer to:

== People ==
=== First name ===
- Abdulrasheed Adewale Akanbi (born 1967), Nigerian monarch
- Abdulrasheed Bawa (born 1980), Nigerian detective
- Abdulrasheed Umaru (born 1999), Qatari professional footballer

=== Surname ===
- Abdullahi Taiwo Abdulrasheed (born 1971), Nigerian politician
