= Omotosho Olakunle Rasaq =

Nigerian politician (born 1973)

The Honourable Omotosho Olakunle Rasaq

Member of the Kwara State House of Assembly
- Incumbent
- Assumed office 18 March 2023

Member of the Kwara State House of Assembly from Isin Local Government
- Incumbent
- Assumed office 18 March 2023
- Constituency: Oke-onigbin

Personal details
- Born: 3 May 1973 (age 53) Agbonda,Irepodun Local Government Kwara State Nigeria
- Party: All Progressive Congress
- Education: Kwara State Polytechnic
- Occupation: Politician; Accountant

Omotosho Olakunle Rasaq is a Nigerian politician representing the Isin constituency, Isin local government area in the Kwara State House of Assembly.

== Early life and education ==
Rasaq was born on 5 March 1973 in Oke-Onigbin, Isin local government area of Kwara State, Nigeria. He attended Oke-Onigbin Community primary school and Oke-Onigbin Secondary School between 1986-1995. He bagged his National Diploma (Nigeria) and Higher National Diploma certificates from Kwara State Polytechnic in 1998 and 2003 respectively.

== Career ==
Rasaq is an accounting officer and the CEO of Bellumin Int’l and Omo Aro farm before joining politics he had previously contested under the flag of Accord Party in 2007 before joining All Progressive Congress to contest and won in 2023 general election as the Kwara state 10th assembly member.
