= Deborah Egunyomi =

Nigerian academic

Prof. Deborah Adetunbi Egunyomi, Department of Adult Education, University of Ibadan, Ibadan, Nigeria

Deborah Adetunbi Egunyomi (born 10 December 1953) is a professor of Continuing and Non-Formal Education at the University of Ibadan, Ibadan, Nigeria, where she previously served as the Head of the Adult Education Department. She was a member of the Visitation Panel set up by Ekiti state government to reposition the College of Health Science and Technology, Ijero-Ekiti.

== Early life and education ==
Egunyomi was born in Ikole-Ekiti, Ekiti State, Nigeria, to David and Esther Famoroti. She attended Methodist School, Ikole-Ekiti, in 1959–1964 for her primary education, Saint Mary's Girls Grammar School for her secondary education between 1964 and 1970, and Kwara State College of Education, Ilorin, from 1974 to 1977. She later attended the University of Ibadan for her B.Sc.Ed between 1980 and 1983, before earning an M.Ed in Education Planning in 1984 and a Ph.D. degree in 1986.

== Career ==
In 1986, Egunyomi began her academic career at the University of Ibadan as a graduate assistant. She was involved in the feasibility studies for the establishment of the External Studies Programme, now the Distance Learning Centre, of the University of Ibadan.

She became a lecturer in 1992, a senior lecturer in 1995, and a professor in 2009. She was the Acting Head of the Department of Adult Education between February 2010 and January 2012 and was later re-appointed as substantive Head of the Department in 2014.

As the first female professor in the Department of Adult Education, Egunyomi delivered the fifth annual Inaugural Lecture at the University of Ibadan on 2 July 2015. She served as an external examiner to many Nigerian Universities and many Nigerian Colleges of Education at the undergraduate and postgraduate levels. She has served as a consultant to national and international organizations such as UNICEF, UNESCO, UNDP, federal government agencies, and non-governmental organizations.

She also served as an external examiner to the University of Legon, Ghana, from 2007 until 2012. She was appointed as a member of EKSG Appoints Visitation Panel for College of Health Science and Technology, Ijero-Ekiti by Ekiti State Governor, Dr. Kayode Fayemi.

== Conferences and publications ==
Egunyomi attended several national and international conferences and workshops, such as the National Workshop on Continuing Education Programs in the Nigerian Faculty of Education held at the University of Ibadan during 10–12 September 1990; the fourth E9 Ministerial Review Meeting held in Beijing, China, on 22–23 August 2001; Nigerian National Council for Adult Education (NNCAE) 2008 Annual National Conference held in Minna, Niger State, Nigeria, November 2008; and the fifth World Conference on Environmental Education held in Montreal, Canada, April 2009.

Egunyomi has published more than 80 materials locally and internationally, including book chapters, journal articles, conference papers, technical reports, books, and monographs.

== Family ==
She is married to Adeyemi Egunyomi, a retired professor of botany.
