= Moshood Olanrewaju Bakare =

Nigerian politician (born 1974)

The Honourable Moshood Olanrewaju Bakare

Member of the Kwara State House of Assembly
- In office 18 March 2015 – 18 March 2019

Member of the Kwara State House of Assembly from Ifelodun Local Government
- In office 18 March 2015 – 18 March 2019
- Constituency: Omupo

Personal details
- Born: 7 May 1974 (age 52) Omupo,Ifelodun Local Government Kwara State Nigeria
- Party: People's Democratic Party (Nigeria)
- Education
- Occupation: Politician

Moshood Olanrewaju Bakare (born May 7, 1974 ) is a Nigerian politician and member of the 8th Kwara State House of Assembly representing Omupo constituency the Kwara State House of Assembly.
