= Yusuf Abdulwaheed Gbenga =

Nigerian politician (born 1982)

The Honourable Yusuf Abdulwaheed Gbenga

Member of the Kwara State House of Assembly
- Incumbent
- Assumed office 18 March 2023

Member of the Kwara State House of Assembly from Offa Local Government
- Incumbent
- Assumed office 18 March 2023
- Constituency: Essa/Shawo/Igboidun

Personal details
- Born: 13 June 1977 (age 49) Offa,Offa Local Government Kwara State Nigeria
- Party: All Progressive Congress
- Education: Kwara State Polytechnic
- Alma mater: Kwara State Polytechnic
- Occupation: Politician; Project Manager; Mechanical Engineer

Yusuf Abdulwaheed Gbenga is a Nigerian mechanical engineer and politician representing the Essa/Shawo Igboidun constituency, Offa local government area in the 9th and 10th kwara State House of Assembly.

== Early life and education ==
Yusuf was born on 13 June 1982 in Offa, Offa Local Government area of Kwara State Nigeria. He studied Mechanical Engineering Technology (Automotive) at Kwara State Polytechnic where he earned his Higher National Diploma in 2005.

== Career ==
Yusuf is a certified mechanical engineer and transitioned into politics after serving under the Kwara State Ministry of Works and the Kwara State House of Assembly from 2010 to 2018. He contested and won the ticket to represent Essa/Shawo/Igboidun constituency in the Kwara State House of Assembly under the All Progressive Congress in 2019 and won his re-election bid during the 2023 general election.
