= Itmam al-Hujjah =

Islamic concept

Itmam al-Hujjah (Arabic: إِتْمَام ٱلْحُجَّة, ʾitmām al-ḥujjah), meaning "Completion of Proof", is an Islamic concept denoting that religious truth has been completely clarified by a Messenger of Allah and made available to a people, who are considered to have no excuse to deny it.

== Role of a Messenger ==
The concept of Itmām al-hujjah requires that religious truth is presented by a Rasul (Messenger) and not by a mere Nabi (Prophet). The former is distinguished from the latter by having received a message for a community in the form of a book and by being assured success. While all messengers are prophets, not all prophets are messengers. In Shiite Islam, an Imam can also be hujjah through whom Allah's presence becomes established for a believer.

== Punishment of adversaries ==
The Qur'an asserts that after Itmām al-hujjah has been attained, those rejecting the religious truth have no excuse and are punished by Allah.

This punishment is considered to occur both in this world and the next world. The judgment in this world is considered a rehearsal for the ultimate punishment or reward on the Day of Judgement.

The Qur'an explains this punishment in the following verse:

And the disbelievers said to their Messengers: "We will drive you out of our land, or you return to our religion". But their Lord inspired [this message] to them [the Messengers]: "Verily We will cause the wrong-doers to perish! And verily We will cause you to abide in the land, and succeed them. This is for those who feared the time when they shall stand before My tribunal and those who feared My warnings". ^{[Quran 14:9–14]}

Generally, the punishment is considered to come either through natural disaster or through human hands.

=== Punishment through natural disaster ===
Punishment comes through natural calamities, if the Messenger has very few companions and no place to migrate.

Examples in the Qur'an are the nations of Noah, Lot, Saleh, and Shoaib along with some other nations of Messengers, which were punished in the form of raging storms, cyclones and other calamities, which completely destroyed them. A notable exception would be the "People of the Book", who as monotheists were not destroyed but reduced to a subjugated status. The Israelites are considered punished by "constant subjugation to the followers of Jesus till the Day of Judgement". The Qur'an explains:

Remember when Allah said: 'O Jesus! I will terminate [your period] and raise you to Myself and cleanse you from those who have denied you; I will make those who follow you superior to those who reject faith till the Day of Resurrection.' ^{[Quran 3:55]}

=== Punishment through human hands ===
By fights or wars or Punishment comes through human hands, if the Messenger has migrated from his people to another place, where he has achieved political sovereignty and makes a treaty of religious and social freedom between different groups, and whoever breaks them or transgress limits there is a justified provision to punish. Muhammad made the Constitution of Medina which speaks about secularism, justice and freedom. So there should be no point of misconception with the following verse:

But when the forbidden months are past, then fight and slay the Pagans wherever ye find them, and seize them, beleaguer them, and lie in wait for them in every stratagem (of war); but if they repent, and establish regular prayers and practise regular charity, then open the way for them: for Allah is Oft-forgiving, Most Merciful. ^{[Quran 9:5]}

and

Fight those who believe not in Allah or the Last Day, nor hold that forbidden which has been forbidden by Allah and His Messenger, nor acknowledge the Religion of Truth, from among the People of the Book, until they pay the Jizyah with willing submission and are subdued. ^{[Quran 9:29]}

Muslims also cite Musa as an example, especially his punishment of those worshipping the golden calf.

== See also ==
- Types of Islamic Jihad
  - Islam and war
  - List of expeditions of Muhammad
  - Diplomatic career of Muhammad
  - Military career of Muhammad
- Islamic terms
  - Dawah
  - Hujja (Shia Islam)
  - Repentance in Islam
- Revelation
  - Proselytism
  - Fate of the unlearned
