= Muhammed Ba'Aziki Suleiman =

Nigerian politician (born 1974)

The Honourable Muhammed Ba'Aziki Suleiman

Member of the Kwara State House of Assembly
- In office 18 March 2015 – 18 March 2019

Member of the Kwara State House of Assembly from Kaiama Local Government
- Incumbent
- Assumed office 18 March 2023
- Constituency: Adena/Bani/Gwaria

Personal details
- Born: 15 March 1973 (age 53) Gwaria,Kaiama Local Government Kwara State Nigeria
- Party: People's Democratic Party (Nigeria)
- Education
- Occupation: Politician

Muhammed Ba’Aziki Suleiman Pronounciation(born March 15, 1973) is a Nigerian politician and member of the 8th Kwara State House of Assembly representing Adena/Bani/Gwaria constituency the Kwara State House of Assembly.
