= Felicia Ebun Owolabi =

Nigerian politician

Deputy Whip of the Kwara State House of Assembly
- Constituency: Ekiti

Personal details
- Born: January 3, 1956 (age 70) Osi, Ekiti Local Government Area, Kwara State, Nigeria
- Education: Diploma in Secretarial Studies; Bachelor of Education
- Occupation: Politician

Felicia Ebun Owolabi (born January 3, 1956) is a Nigerian Politician and the Deputy whip of the 8th Kwara State House of Assembly representing Ekiti constituency the Kwara State House of Assembly.

== Early life and education ==
Felicia was born January 3, 1956 in Osi Ekiti local government area of Kwara State Nigeria. She held Diploma in Secretarial Studies and Bachelor degree in Education

== Career ==
Felicia has held various key positions, including Personal Assistant to the Waziri of Ilorin, Dr. Abubakar Olusola Saraki. She also served as Commissioner for Culture and Social Development, Special Adviser on Millennium Development Goals, and Deputy Chief of Staff at the Government House. Additionally, she was a National Delegate to the PDP Convention in 2006. Her experience also includes being a member of the Kwara State House of Assembly, representing Ekiti constituency, and serving as Deputy Whip of the 8th Assembly.
