= Abdulkadir Segilola Ramat =

Nigerian politician

Deputy House Leader
- Constituency: Ilorin Central

State Woman Leader

Personal details
- Born: September 17, 1968 (age 58) Ilorin, Kwara State, Nigeria
- Party: People's Democratic Party
- Occupation: Politician

Abdulkadir Segilola Ramat (born September 17, 1968) is a Nigerian politician and the deputy house leader of the 8th Kwara State House of Assembly representing Ilorin Central constituency the Kwara State House of Assembly and the state woman leader of People's Democratic Party (Nigeria).

== Early life and education ==
Abdulkadir was born on September 17, 1968, in Ilorin, Ilorin West Local Government area of Kwara State, Nigeria. She completed her bachelor's in library and information science and holds certificate in Computer Operation.

== Career ==
Abdulkadir served as the special assistant to the first lady of Kwara State between 2004 and 2007 and senior special assistant to the governor on Poverty Eradication Programme in 2007 during the regime of Senator Bukola Saraki as the executive governor of Kwara state.
