= Shuaib Ahmed Abdulkadir =

Nigerian politician

Member of the Kwara State House of Assembly
- In office 2015–2019
- Constituency: Patigi

Personal details
- Born: 4 January 1966 (age 60) Bida, Niger State, Nigeria
- Education: National Diploma in Estate Management; Degree in Business Administration
- Occupation: Politician

Shuaib Ahmed Abdulkadir (born January 4, 1966) is a Nigerian politician and member of the 8th assembly representing Patigi constituency the Kwara State House of Assembly.

== Early life and education ==
Shuaib was born on January 4, 1966 in Bida, Niger State. He held his Ordinary National Diploma in Estate Management and Degree in Business Administration.
