= Abdulgafar Olayemi Ayinla =

Nigerian politician

The Honourable Abdulgafar Olayemi Ayinla

Member of the Kwara State House of Assembly from Ilorin West Local Government
- Constituency: Ilorin North-West

Personal details
- Born: 5 May 1989 (age 37) Ilorin, Ilorin West Local Government Kwara State Nigeria
- Party: All Progressive Congress
- Education: University of Abuja
- Occupation: Politician

Abdulgafar Olayemi Ayinla is a Nigerian legal practitioner and politician representing the Ilorin North West constituency, Ilorin-west local government area in the Kwara State 9th Assembly and served as the chairman house committee on local government and Chieftaincy in the Kwara State House of Assembly.

== Early life and education ==
Abdulgafar was born on 5 October 1989, in Ilorin, Ilorin North-West constituency, Kwara State, Nigeria. He attended Federal Government College, Ilorin to obtain his West Africa Secondary School Certificate, he studied law at Nigerian Law School and University of Abuja, in Abuja to obtain SSSC, LLB and BL certificates respectively.

== Career ==
Abdulgafar began his career as a legal practitioner, working in the legal department of the Independent National Electoral Commission and as a Legal Officer at Aiyegbami & Co. in Ilorin. Abdulgafar contested and won the election as a state assembly member of the 9th Assembly at the Kwara State House of Assembly in the 2019 general election, representing the Ilorin North-West constituency. He also served as Chairman of the House Committee on Local Government and Chieftaincy Affairs at the 9th Assembly.
