= Amosa Mohammed Mobolaji =

Nigerian Politician

- Born: 1957 March, 2nd
- Citizenship: Nigerian
- Occupations: Politician; Teacher; Nigerian Air Force

Amosa Mohammed Mobolaji (born March 2, 1957) is a Nigerian politician and member of the 8th assembly representing Afon constituency the Kwara State House of Assembly.

== Early life and education ==
Amosa was born on March 2, 1957, in Ogele, Asa Local Government Area of Kwara State, Nigeria. He holds an Aircraft Electronics Certificate, A & C Level Maintenance certification on helicopters, and an Ordinary National Diploma in Computer Engineering.

== Career ==
Amosa is a trained and practicing teacher. Previously, he served in the Nigerian Air Force for 28 years, rising to the rank of Warrant Officer before transitioning into politics. He is an Honorable member representing the Afon constituency in the Kwara State House of Assembly's 8th assembly.
