= Hassan Oyeleke =

Nigerian politician (born 1974)

The Honourable Hassan Oyeleke Oyeyemi

Member of the Kwara State House of Assembly
- In office 18 March 2015 – 18 March 2019
- Constituency: Essa/Shawo/Igboidun

Personal details
- Born: 1 October 1962 (age 64) Offa, Kwara State
- Party: Peoples Democratic Party
- Occupation: Politician

Hassan Oyeleke Oyeyemi (born 1 October 1962) is a Nigerian Politician and the majority leader of the 8th assembly representing Essa/Shawo/Igboidun constituency the Kwara State House of Assembly.
