= Saheed Popoola =

Nigerian Politician and Architect

- Constituency: Ojomu/Balogun

Personal details
- Born: 17 January 1971 (age 55) Offa, Nigeria.
- Citizenship: Nigerian
- Spouse: Mrs Popoola
- Education: Obafemi Awolowo University, Nigeria. New York Film Academy
- Occupation: Politician . Architect

Saheed Adekeye Olalekan Popoola (born 17 January 1971) is a Nigerian politician and a builder. He is a member of the 8th Kwara State House of Assembly and 9th Kwara State House of Assembly, representing the Ojomu/Balogun Constituency. He previously served as executive chairman of the Offa within the Kwara State of Nigeria.

== Early life ==
He was born in Obatiwajoye compound in Offa on 17 January 1971. He earned his bachelor's degree from Obafemi Awolowo University in Political Science and attended Delar College of Education, Idoosi, Ekiti State to earn his National Certificate of Education.

== Career ==
Popoola served as Commissioner for Youth and Sports between 2008 and 2011 under Governor Bukola Saraki and Governor Abdulfatah Ahmed.

Popoola started his political career as executive chairman of Offa Local Government Kwara State Nigeria, between 2011 and 2013.

He was elected to the Kwara House of Assembly (7th and 8th Assembly Legislature) between 2011 and 2019. He joined the All Progressive Congress (APC) before switching to the Social Democratic Party (SDP).

On 28 March 2022, the Kwara State House of Assembly member declared Popoola's seat vacant due to his defection to SDP from APC, the Party for whom he won the seat. It was speculated that Popoola was charged with antiparty activities due to his relationship with former Senate President Bukola Saraki before his official switch to SDP.

In 2023, he was SDP nominee for Federal House of Representatives representing the Ifelodun/Offa/Oyun Federal Constituency. He lost to Hom Tijani Kayode Ismail of the All Progressive Congress (APC).
