= Awodiji Omotayo Felix =

Nigerian politician (born 1959)

The Honourable Awodiji Omatayo Felix

Member of the Kwara State House of Assembly
- Incumbent
- Assumed office 18 March 2023

Member of the Kwara State House of Assembly from Irepodun Local Government
- Incumbent
- Assumed office 18 March 2023
- Constituency: Irepodun

Personal details
- Born: 12 February 1959 (age 67) Lagos,Lagos State Nigeria
- Party: All Progressive Congress
- Education: Lagos State University
- Occupation: Politician; Administrative Officer

Awodiji Omotayo Felix is a Nigerian administrator and politician representing the Irepodun constituency, Irepodun local government area in the 9th Assembly of Kwara State House of Assembly.

== Early life and education ==
Awodiji was born on 12 February 1959 in Lagos State Nigeria with his origin from Ifelodun Local Government Area of kwara state. He studied Performing Arts at the Lagos State University Ojo, Lagos and previously attended Government Secondary School, Bauchi and Oro Grammar School, Oro in Kwara State.

== Career ==
Awodiji is an administrator and politician. Prior to his entry into politics, he held various administrative roles, including Administrative Officer at the Lagos State Council for Arts and Culture, as well as Corporate Affairs and Administrative Officer at Asabo Ventures Ltd. Additionally, he served as Administrative Manager at Doyin Pharmaceutical. Awodiji's transition into politics led to his appointment as the development officer representing Ifelodun Local Government by the executive governor of kwara state Mallam AbdulRahman AbdulRazaq. Prior to his election as a member of the Kwara State House of Assembly, representing Irepodun constituency at the 9th Assembly.
