= Ahmed Ibn Mohammed =

Nigerian Politician

Member of the Kwara State House of Assembly
- Constituency: Kaiama/Wajibe

Personal details
- Born: November 11, 1979 (age 47)
- Occupation: Politician

Ahmed Ibn Mohammed (born November 11, 1979) is a Nigerian politician and member of the 8th assembly representing Kaiama/Wajibe constituency at the Kwara State House of Assembly.
