= Hujja (Shia Islam) =

Arabic Shia term for a prophet or imam

A term used in Shi'i terminology, "hujja" means "proof [implied: proof of God]." It is usually used to refer to a single individual in any given human era who represents God's "proof" to humanity. The hujja is an Islamic prophet or an Imam who possesses a relationship with God that is greater than anyone else. The Imam who is the hujja of his time functions as the ultimate mediator between God and humanity, giving the Imam the greatest precedence for interpretation of the Qur'an. As the mediator between God and humanity, the Imam is the only one who can properly resolve conflicting interpretations of the Qur'an's words, giving the Imam ultimate authority over divine knowledge. The Quran cannot speak for itself, thus, the fundamental mediator between God and humanity must be a person, the hujja. In Twelver shi'ism the title "hujja" is specifically applied to the Twelfth Imam who is believed to be in hiding and is attributed with the tradition of using Shi'i hadith to guide the religious community. The word Imam and hujja do not necessarily refer to the same person because an Imam may not be hujja but may keep the title of Imam.

== Alleged proof of Hujja ==
The Imam that is hujja is hujja for several reasons in Shi'i Qur'an interpretation and Shi'i hadith. The first is presented by the Imam's role as mediator between God and humanity. The divine appointment of the Imam, according to Shi'i belief, was passed down from Muhammad to 'Ali and his sons al-Hasan and al-Husayn, who passed it onto their sons and so on. Therefore, it is believed that only those who are members of Muhammad's family line are hujja.

The second supposed proof an Imam is hujja is that "he is a channel of divine grace which comes to him inwardly from the suprasensible realm".

The third proof an Imam is hujja is based on the Imam's immunity from the pollution of human sin. The Imam is such a divine spiritual figure he is free from committing human error or misinterpreting the Qur'an, which would otherwise lead to human error and sin. For a man who does commit sin is not fit to lead for he can spread sin and is therefore denied the rank of Imam and therefore cannot possess hujja. Only those who are free from error can be considered divinely touched and therefore are hujja and entitled to the Imamate.

The fourth reason is said to be that God's grace keeps his creatures towards obedience and keeps them away from disobedience. However, if God orders man to do something he knows man cannot do or will have difficulty doing, he would contradict His own aim. Therefore, God gives humanity hujja to help lead man toward God and his spiritual greatness.

The last justification of the hujja comes from the idea that without the hujja the world would not exist. "The world cannot exist even for a moment without the imam who is the hujja of God. If the imam were to be taken away from the earth even for an hour, the earth would swallow up its inhabitants just as the sea swallows its people".

== See also ==
- Bab (Shia Islam)
- Hujjah
