= Adams Aliyu Ishiaku =

Nigerian politician (born 1963)

The Honourable Adams Aliyu Ishiaku

Member of the Kwara State House of Assembly
- In office 18 March 2015 – 18 March 2019

Member of the Kwara State House of Assembly from Edu Local Government
- In office 18 March 2015 – 18 March 2019
- Constituency: Edu

Personal details
- Born: 27 March 1960 (age 66) Guye-Doko, Edu Local Government Kwara State Nigeria
- Party: People's Democratic Party (Nigeria)
- Education
- Occupation: Politician

Adams Aliyu Ishiaku (born March 27, 1960) is a Nigerian Politician and member of the 8th assembly representing Edu constituency at the Kwara State House of Assembly where he served as the Chairman House Committee on Agriculture and Natural Resources.

== Early life and education ==
Ishiaku was born on 27 March 1960 in Guye-Doko, Edu Local Government Area of Kwara State, Nigeria. He obtained a Grade II Teachers' Certificate and later completed the Interim Joint Matriculation Board (IJMB) programme. He earned a Bachelor of Science degree in Sociology.

== Political career ==
Ishiaku is a Nigerian politician and a member of the People's Democratic Party (PDP). He represented the Edu Constituency in the Kwara State House of Assembly from 2015 to 2019. During his tenure, he served as Chairman of the House Committee on Agriculture and Natural Resources. Before his election to the House of Assembly, he served as Chairman of the Social Democratic Party in Edu Local Government Area, Commissioner for Lands and Housing, Commissioner for Works and Transport, and a member of the Kwara State Pension Board.
