= Abdulrafiu Abdulrahman =

Nigerian politician (born 1963

The Honourable Abdulrafiu Abdulrahman

Member of the Kwara State House of Assembly
- In office 18 March 2015 – 18 March 2019

Member of the Kwara State House of Assembly from Ilorin Local Government
- Incumbent
- Assumed office 18 March 2023
- Constituency: Ilorin North-West

Personal details
- Born: 5 February 1963 (age 63) Ilorin,Ilorin-North West Local Government Kwara State Nigeria
- Party: People's Democratic Party (Nigeria)
- Education
- Occupation: Politician

Abdulrafiu Abdulrahman (born February 5, 1963) is a Nigerian Politician and member of the 8th assembly representing Ilorin North West constituency at the Kwara State House of Assembly.
