= Emmanuel Folorunsho Abodunrin =

Nigerian politician (born 1953)

The Honourable Emmanuel Folorunsho Abodunrin

Member of the Kwara State House of Assembly
- In office 18 March 2015 – 18 March 2019

Member of the Kwara State House of Assembly from Isin Local Government
- In office 18 March 2015 – 18 March 2019
- Constituency: Isin

Personal details
- Born: 5 February 1953 (age 73) Isanlu-Isin,Isin Local Government Kwara State Nigeria
- Party: People's Democratic Party (Nigeria)
- Education
- Occupation: Politician

Emmanuel Folorunsho Abodunrin (born February 5, 1953) is a Nigerian politician who is a member of the 8th assembly representing Isin constituency at the Kwara State House of Assembly.
