= Ojo Olayiwola Oyebode =

Nigerian politician (born 1975)

The Honourable Ojo Olayiwola Oyebode

10th Deputy Speaker of the Kwara State House of Assembly
- Incumbent
- Assumed office 18 March 2023
- Preceded by: Adetiba-Olanrewaju Raphael Olalekan

Member of the Kwara State House of Assembly from Oyun Local Government
- Incumbent
- Assumed office 18 March 2023
- Constituency: Oke-ogun

Personal details
- Born: 4 April 1975 (age 51) Ipee,Oyun Local Government Kwara State Nigeria
- Party: All Progressive Congress
- Education: Ahmadu Bello University
- Occupation: Politician; Legal Practitioner

Ojo Olayiwola Oyebode a Nigerian politician representing the Odo-Ogun constituency, Oyun local government area in the Kwara State House of Assembly he is the 10th deputy house leader of Kwara State House of Assembly.

== Early life and education ==
Ojo was born on 4 April 1975 in Ipee, Oyun Local Government Area of Kwara State. He attended Baptist LGEA School Ipee between 1984 and 1989 and Jama’at Nasir Islam School Owu-Isin Secondary School, of Kwara State, between 1996 and 2002. Ojo studied accountancy at Federal Polytechnic, Offa, and earned his National Diploma in 2005.

== Political career ==
Between 2007 and 2010, Ojo served as a councillor of the Ipee Ward Councillorship in Oyun Local Government of Kwara State before becoming the vice-chairman of Oyun Local Government. In 2019, Ojo contested under the platform of All Progressive Congress as honourable representing Oke-ogun Constituency at the Kwara State House of Assembly and won his re-election bid in 2023 Nigerian general election and he was elected to serves as the deputy speaker to Hon. Salihu Yakubu-Danladi in the 10th Assembly.
