= Abdullahi Halidu Danbaba =

Nigerian politician (born 1978)

The Honourable Abdullahi Halidu Danbaba

Member of the Kwara State House of Assembly
- Incumbent
- Assumed office 18 March 2023

Member of the Kwara State House of Assembly from BabadabeYaralea, Kaiama Local Government
- Incumbent
- Assumed office 18 March 2023
- Constituency: Kaiama/Kemanji/Wajibe

Personal details
- Born: 13 February 1978 (age 48) BabadabeYaralea, Kaiama Local Government Kwara State Nigeria
- Party: All Progressive Congress
- Education: Kwara State Polytechnic
- Alma mater: Usman Danfodio University
- Occupation: Politician; Political Scientist

Abdullahi Halidu Danbaba is a Nigerian politician representing the Kaiama/Kemanji/Wajibe constituency, Kaiama local government area in the Kwara State 9th and 10th Assembly at Kwara State House of Assembly.

== Early life and education ==
Danbaba was born on 13 February 1978 in BabadabeYaralea, Kaiama Local Government area of Kwara State Nigeria. He attended Kwara State Polytechnic for his IJMB ‘A’ in 1995 and Usman Danfodio University for his bachelor's degree in Political Science in 2000.

== Career ==
Danbaba previously served as Special Assistant on Legislative Matters to the former Chairman of Kaiama Local Government, a position he held from 2004 to 2007. In 2007, he was appointed Special Assistant to the Executive Governor of Kwara State, Senator Bukola Saraki. He was re-appointed to the same position in 2018, serving under His Excellency, Governor Abdulfatah Ahmed. In 2019, he contested and won an election as a member of the 9th Assembly in Kwara State under the All Progressive Congress platform and won his re-election bid in the 2023 general election to represent Kaiama/Kemanji/Wajibe Constituency in the 10th Assembly.
