= Muhammed Kareem Musa =

Nigerian Politician

Member of the Kwara State House of Assembly

Member of the U.S. House of Representatives from Kwara State
- Constituency: Patigi

Personal details
- Occupation: Politician

Muhammed Kareem Musa is a Nigerian politician representing the Patigi constituency, Patigi local government area in the Kwara State House of Assembly under the platform of All Progressive Congress.
