= Babatunde Ayi Olatundun =

Nigerian politician (born 1961)

The Honourable Babatunde Ayi Olatundun

Member of the Kwara State House of Assembly
- Incumbent
- Assumed office 18 March 2023

Member of the Kwara State House of Assembly from Ilorin, Ilorin West Local Government
- Incumbent
- Assumed office 18 March 2023
- Constituency: Ilorin North-West Constituency

Personal details
- Born: 12 August 1961 (age 65) Ilorin, Ilorin West Local Government Kwara State Nigeria
- Party: All Progressive Congress
- Education
- Occupation: Politician; Administrator

Babatunde Ayi Olatundun is a Nigerian administrator and politician. She represents the Ilorin North-West constituency, Ilorin West local government area in the 10th Assembly of the Kwara State House of Assembly.

== Early life ==
Babatunde was born on 12 August 1961 in Ilorin, Ilorin West Local Government area of Kwara State Nigeria. She attended Oyun Baptist High School, Ijagbo, in Oyun and earned her West African School Certificate in 1981.

== Career ==
Between 1989 and 1994 she served as the administrative officer at Kwara State Broadcasting Services (Radio Kwara) and other private firms. She joined politics in 2014, when she was appointed to serve as the state woman leader of both the People's Democratic Party and Buhari Support Organisation. She was elected as the state assembly member that represents Ilorin North-West constituency in the Kwara State House of Assembly in the 2023 general election.
