= Afolayan Musa Moses =

Nigerian politician (born 1963)

The Honourable Afolayan Musa Moses

Member of the Kwara State House of Assembly
- In office 18 March 2015 – 18 March 2019
- Constituency: Oke-Ero

Personal details
- Born: 13 August 1956 (age 69) Idofin-Igbana, Oke-Ero, Kwara State
- Party: People's Democratic Party (Nigeria)
- Occupation: Politician

Afolayan Musa Moses (born 13 August 1956) is a Nigerian politician and member of the 8th House of Assembly representing Oke-Ero constituency the Kwara State House of Assembly.
