= Olushola Odetundun =

Nigerian politician (born 1981)

The Honourable Olushola Odetundun

Member of the Kwara State House of Assembly
- Incumbent
- Assumed office 18 March 2023

Member of the Kwara State House of Assembly from Irepodun Local Government
- Incumbent
- Assumed office 18 March 2023
- Constituency: Irepodun

Personal details
- Born: 4 June 1981 (age 45) Agbonda,Irepodun Local Government Kwara State Nigeria
- Party: All Progressive Congress
- Education: Coventry University
- Occupation: Politician; Project Manager

Olushola Odetundun is a Nigerian politician representing the Irepodun constituency, Irepodun local government area in the Kwara State House of Assembly.

== Early life and education ==
Odetundun was born on 4 June 1981 in Agbonda, Irepodun Local Government Area of Kwara State. He studied sociology at the University of Ilorin, where he earned his bachelor's degree in 2005. He later earned his master's degree in International Tourism Management at Coventry University in 2010.

== Career ==
Odetundun is an experienced Project Manager and expert in Tourism and Events Management. Before joining politics in 2015, he was an aspirant for the Kwara State House of Assembly member under the People's Democratic Party (Nigeria). He later joined the All Progressives Congress and won his seat at the state assembly in the 2023 general elections.
