= Umar Mohammed Gunu =

Nigerian Politician

Chief Whip of the Kwara State House of Assembly
- Constituency: Ilesha/Gwanara

Personal details
- Born: August 15, 1954 (age 72) Yakiru, Kaiama, Kwara State, Nigeria
- Education: Nigeria Certificate of Education; Higher National Diploma in Public Administration
- Occupation: Politician

Umar Mohammed Gunu (born August 15, 1954) is a Nigerian Politician and the chief whip of the 8th assembly representing Ilesha/Gwanara constituency the Kwara State House of Assembly.

== Early life and education ==
Umar was born on August 15, 1954 Yakiru, Kaiama Local Government area of Kwara State Nigeria. He obtained Nigeria Certificate of Education and Higher National Diploma in Public Administration.

== Career ==
Umar Previously, held key positions, including Chairman of the Governing Council at Kwara State College of Education in Ilorin, and Special Adviser on Human Resources Development to the Kwara State government. He was also Special Assistant on Herdsmen and Farm Lands Matters. He is the Honourable member representing Ilesha/Gwanara at State assembly and served as the house Whip.
