= Owolabi Olatunde Rasaq =

Nigerian politician (born 1977)

The Honourable Owolabi Olatunde Rasaq

Member of the Kwara State House of Assembly
- Incumbent
- Assumed office 18 March 2023

Member of the Kwara State House of Assembly from Babanlomo,Ifelodun Local Government
- Incumbent
- Assumed office 18 March 2023
- Constituency: Share/Oke-Ode

Personal details
- Born: 13 June 1977 (age 49) Babanloma,Offa Local Government Kwara State Nigeria
- Party: All Progressive Congress
- Education: Kwara State Polytechnic
- Alma mater: Kwara State Polytechnic
- Occupation: Politician; Project Manager; Town Planner

Owolabi Olatunde Rasaq is a Nigerian town planner and politician representing the Share/Oke-Ode constituency, Ifelodun local government area in the 9th and 10th Assembly of the Kwara State House of Assembly.

== Early life and education ==
Owolabi was born in 1977 in Babanloma, Ifelodun Local Government Area of Kwara State Nigeria. He studied town planning at Kwara State Polytechnic where he earned his National Diploma (Nigeria) in 1998.

== Career ==
Owolabi, a certified town planner, transitioned into politics after serving as the elected councillor for Share III (Adako Ward in Babanloma), Ifelodun Local Government Area Kwara State Nigeria, between 2007 and 2010. Owolabi later contested and won a seat in the Kwara State House of Assembly, representing the Share/Oke-Ode constituency in 2019. He was re-elected in the 2023 general election under the All Progressives Congress platform.
