= Ahmed Saidu Baba =

Nigerian politician (born 1973)

The Honourable Ahmed Saidu Baba

Member of the Kwara State House of Assembly
- Incumbent
- Assumed office 18 March 2019

Member of the Kwara State House of Assembly from Kaiama Local Government
- Incumbent
- Assumed office 18 March 2019
- Constituency: Gwanabe/Adena/Bani/Gweria

Personal details
- Born: 27 December 1973 (age 52) Bani, Kaiama Local Government Kwara State Nigeria
- Party: All Progressive Congress
- Education: Justice Fati Lami Abubakar College of Art and Islamic Legal Studies
- Alma mater
- Occupation: Politician; Project Manager; Administrator

Ahmed Saidu Baba (born 27 December 1973) is a Nigerian politician representing the Gwanabe/Gweria/Bani/Adena constituency, Kaiama local government area in the Kwara State House of Assembly.

== Early life and education ==
Ahmed was born on 27 December 1973 in Bani, Kaiama Local Government Area of Kwara State Nigeria. He studied at Nigerian Army Day Secondary School, Sanni Abacha Barrack, Asokoro, for his post primary school education to obtain the SSCE certificate.

== Career ==
Before his election as Kwara State House of Assembly member he previously served as the Supervisory Councilor for health and Agricultural and Natural Resources from 1996 to 1997.
