= Shoaib Sultan =

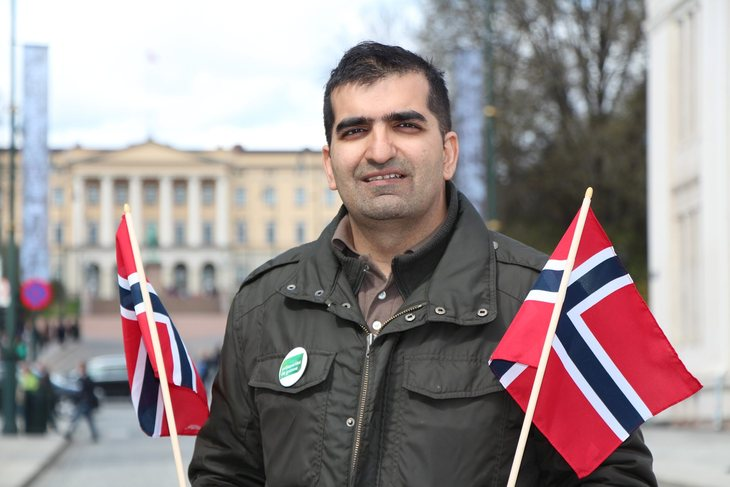
Shoaib Sultan

Shoaib Sultan (born 22 December 1973) is a Norwegian analyst and politician of Pakistani descent.

In September 2011 Sultan was hired as an adviser with responsibility for mapping the extreme-right in Norway at the Norwegian Centre Against Racism. From November 2010 to March 2011 he worked as Head of Secretariat of the Contact Committee for Immigrants and the Authorities, and served as the very first Secretary General of the Islamic Council of Norway in the period 2007-2010, a council where he previously served as an elected secretary (2002–2005). Sultan has previously worked as information officer at the European Council of Religious Leaders.

During his tenure as the general secretary of the islamic council of Norway he was involved participating in and in discussing the role of religious dialogue in Norway, and has worked with issues of freedom of religion. He, together with Olav Fykse Tveit, General Secretary Church of Norway Council on Ecumenical and International Relations, cosigned the Christian-Muslim joint declaration on religious freedom and freedom to choose ones religion They also signed on a joint Statement on Violence in the Family and in Close Relationships. Sultan has been an active voice talking against extremism and condemning terror and promoting tolerance and dialogue. He has also participated in discussion in the wake of a rapewave in Oslo in 2011.

Sultan has been active in the debate about right-wing extremism and the contra-jihad movement since before his position with the Norwegian Centre against Racism, especially after the 2011 Norway attacks, and has written articles on the topic in Norwegian and foreign press.

He writes regular columns for Klassekampen and Aftenposten, and is a prolific writer publishing articles, opinions and analysis in a number of different newspapers and journals. Despite having left the Islamic Council of Norway, Sultan is an often used commentator and analyst in Norwegian media with regards to questions that deal with multiculturalism and islam in Norway, and religious dialogue.

Sultan is a member of the life stance policy commission, working on creating a comprehensive life stance policy. Sultan is a member of the Green Party of Norway and stood for the Norwegian municipal elections in Oslo in 2011. Sultan was the third candidate on the parties list after the two spokespersons Harald August Nissen and Hanna E. Marcussen. The Party secured one position, making Shoaib a deputy for the seat. The elections were seen as the breakthrough for the Green Party of Norway.

== Education ==
Sultan went to high school at Nes high school in Årnes.

He has a bachelor's degree in political science from Colorado State University in Colorado, United States . He also has an MBA (Master of Business Administration) with the fields of finance and management from the same university.

== Bibliography ==
- Essay (Norwegian) in a book about the Norwegian State Church: Muslimer i statskristendommens land, i Didrik Søderlind (red.): Farvel til statskirken? En debattbok om kirke og stat. Oslo: Humanist forlag 2005, s. 83-92
- Article Norwegian) in a journal about Norwegian media and Muslims: Mediene hetser norske muslimer (Samtiden 01, 2006)
- Essay (Norwegian) in a book about the Norwegian State Church: Staten, kirken og muslimene i Njål Høstmælingen, Tore Lindholm og Ingvill T. Plesner (red.): Stat, kirke og menneskerettigheter. Oslo: Abstrakt forlag 2006, s. 140-153.
- Article in a journal about rightwing extremism not picked up by media because of overfocus on islam and Muslims (With Øyvind Strømmen): De usynlige terroristene (Samtiden 02, 2007)
- Article (Norwegian) in journal about islamic humanism: Den islamske humanismen - utopi eller fakta? (Kirke og kultur 02, 2007)
- Muslims in Britain - 2007 (Report for the European Council of Religious Leaders meeting in Birmingham - 2007)
- Article (Norwegian) analysing a movie about Muslims in Norway: Dokumentar uten dokumentasjon (Minerva: 14.12, 2010)
- The Muslims of Norway (Foreign Affairs: 27.07, 2011)

Report on rightwing extremism in Norway Høyreekstremisme i Norge] (rapport fra Antirasistisk Senter, 2012)
