= Vocational Certificate of Education =

Further education qualification in the United Kingdom

Vocational Certificate of Education, usually shortened VCE or Vocational A-Level or AVCE, was a vocational qualification that used to be available in further education colleges and sixth forms in the United Kingdom.

== Subjects and assessment ==
VCEs were available in many subjects including Information and Communication Technology (ICT), Health and Social Care, Hospitality and Management, Leisure and Recreation, Travel and Tourism and Business. Some students preferred the vocational system due to its practical 'hands-on' nature.

The qualification was created in September 2000 to replace the Advanced GNVQ, with the main change being that the marking system was altered from the three level Distinction, Merit and Pass system to A–E grading, bringing the AVCE into line with A-Levels. The AVCE was intended to lead on to higher education or employment and was made up of modules, each covering different aspects of the subject. Some of these modules overlapped and some institutions chose to merge their content. Students had to complete a set number of modules in order to qualify for an AVCE:

- AVCE Double Award - 12 units (worth two A-levels)
- AVCE Single Award - 6 units (worth one A-level)
- ASVCE - 3 units (worth one AS-level)

Assessment was by a mixture of continuous assessment, based on a portfolio of evidence, and externally set and marked examinations.

== Withdrawal ==
In March 2004 the qualification was criticised by Ofsted, who found that teachers spend most of their time assessing work rather than teaching students. They reported that students weren't challenged enough, and were not provided with the skills they would need in the workplace. Ofsted called for the Qualifications and Curriculum Authority (QCA) to review course specifications, and to make work experience a mandatory part of the qualification. The QCA responded to the report, announcing that changes would be made in 2004.

The QCA, along with Welsh equivalent ACCAC, decided in June 2004 to withdraw the Advanced VCE, with the final candidates starting in September 2004. They created and piloted an "Applied GCE (AGCE)" qualification to replace the AVCE. Edexcel withdrew AVCE ICT in June 2006 but students were able to re-submit coursework until November 2006 and could re-sit exams until January 2007. The GNVQ is still currently available in two forms – Foundation and Intermediate levels – which both work up to the Advanced level. This was withdrawn in 2007. The decision to withdraw the qualification proved unpopular.
