= Babaoye Olaitan Matthew =

Nigerian Politician

Member of the Kwara State House of Assembly
- In office 2015–2019
- Constituency: Irepodun

Personal details
- Born: June 16, 1968 (age 58) Oro, Kwara State, Nigeria
- Party: All Progressives Congress
- Education: NCE; Bachelor of Education (Education Management)
- Occupation: Politician; Teacher

Babaoye Olaitan Matthew (born June 16, 1968) is a Nigerian Politician and member of the 8th assembly representing Irepodun constituency the Kwara State House of Assembly where it was reported that he empowered his constituents with over 2 million naira across the 11 wards.
