= Rukayat Shittu =

Nigerian journalist and politician

Member Owode/Onire constituency, Kwara State House of Assembly.
- Assuming office June 2023
- Succeeding: Ambali Olatunji Ibrahim

Personal details
- Born: 6 June 1996 (age 30) Manyan, Asa, Kwara State
- Party: All Progressives Congress
- Occupation: Journalist; Politician

Rukayat Motunrayo Shittu (born 6 June 1996) is a Nigerian journalist and politician representing the Owode/Onire constituency, Asa local government area in the Kwara State House of Assembly.

== Early life and education ==
Rukayat Shittu was born on 6 June 1996 in Manyan, Asa Local Government Area of Kwara State. She attended Baptist Primary School LGEA between 1998 and 2004 in Ilorin and Government Girls Day Secondary School, Oko Erin where she obtained her Senior Secondary School Certificate in 2011. She attended Kwara State College of Arabic and Islamic Legal Studies where she obtained a diploma certificate in Mass communication and Islamic studies in 2015. In 2017, she got admitted into the National Open University of Nigeria (NOUN) to study Mass Communication and graduated in 2022.

== Career ==
Shittu was the first female senate president at the Congress of NOUN Students (CONS), the official student association at the National Open University of Nigeria (NOUN). After graduating, she worked at Just Event Media, based in Ilorin as a journalist. In 2022, Shittu picked the interest form for the Kwara state House of Assembly under the All Progressives Congress and was declared member-elect of the 10th Kwara state House of Assembly in the 2023 Kwara state House of Assembly elections.

Rukayat is a member of the leading Pro-Democracy group, Kwara Must Change, which is one of the leading groups that spearheaded the Otoge political revolution in 2019. She operated as internal publicity secretary of the group. The Kwara Must Change mentored, sponsored and promoted her candidature, being the organization that champions advocacy for gender inclusion in the state. In 2019, the group demanded for a minimum of 50% of cabinet positions for women, which the state government adopted.

Professional Development and Training Participation

Rukayat has actively engaged in various seminars and workshops. In 2020, she participated in the International Media Training Center Workshop and completed a course on Introduction to Journalism. In 2021, she took part in the Trainirelations Emerging Women in Politics, IT Africa Training and the Youth Motion Fellowship. Her professional development continued in 2022 with her attendance at the Cyber Naija with Hashim Project and the Progressive Women Academy.
