= Kwara State College of Education, Oro =

Nigerian higher education institution

- Motto: Education For Excellence
- Type: Public
- Established: 1976
- Founders: Kwara State government
- Affiliations: Ekiti State University
- Provost: Mukaila Ayanda Aremu
- Location: Oro, Kwara State, Nigeria; 8.22074°N 4.88703°E
- Website: Official website

The Kwara State College of Education, Oro is a state government higher education institution located in Oro, Kwara State, Nigeria. It is affiliated to Ekiti State University for its degree programmes. The current provost is Mukaila Ayanda Aremu.

== History ==
The Kwara State College of Education, Oro was established in 1976.

== Academician ==
School of Education

Dean Dr Dean – Dr. S. O. Alao.

== Courses ==
The institution offers the following courses:

- Arabic
- Primary Education Studies
- Chemistry Education
- Business Education
- Islamic Studies
- Computer Education
- French
- Hausa
- Christian Religious Studies
- Education and Mathematics
- Education and English Language
- Education and Yoruba
- Economics
- Education and French
- History
- Education and Integrated Science
- Social Studies
- Geography
- Early Childhood Care Education
- Education and Political Science
- Physical And Health Education
- Fine And Applied Arts
- Education and Social Studies
- Agricultural Science Education
- Nursery and Primary Education
- Biology Education
