= Olakunle George =

Nigerian academic

- Born: Nigeria
- Occupations: academic and professor

Academic background
- Education: University of Ibadan; Cornell University

Academic work
- Discipline: English and Africana Studies
- Institutions: University of Oregon; Northwestern University; Brown University
- Notable works: Relocating Agency: Modernity and African Letters; African Literature and Social Change: Tribe, Nation, Race

Olakunle George is a Nigerian academic and Professor of English and Africana Studies at Brown University.

== Education ==
He was educated at the University of Ibadan in Nigeria (BA, MA) and Cornell University (MA, PhD).

== Career ==
George is a professor of English and Africana studies at Brown University.

He previously held the William A. Dyer Jr. Assistant Professorship at Brown University from 1996 to 2002. Previous appointments include Assistant Professorships at the University of Oregon (1992–96) and Northwestern University (1992–1996).

He was a fellow of The Institute for Advanced Study at Princeton (1995–1996), and was also awarded a fellowship from the National Endowment for the Humanities (1995–1996). He serves on the editorial boards of Ariel: A Review of International English Literature and Savannah Review (founded by Abiola Irele).

His publications include: African Literature and Social Change: Tribe, Nation, Race (Indiana University Press, 2017); and Relocating Agency: Modernity and African Letters (State University of New York Press, 2003).
