= Abdullahi Taiwo Abdulrasheed =

Nigerian politician (born 1971)

The Honourable Abdullahi Taiwo Abdulrasheed

Member of the Kwara State House of Assembly
- In office 18 March 2015 – 18 March 2019

Member of the Kwara State House of Assembly from Asa Local Government
- In office 18 March 2015 – 18 March 2019
- Constituency: Owode/Onire

Personal details
- Born: 29 September 1971 (age 55) Owode, Asa Local Government Kwara State, Nigeria
- Party: People's Democratic Party (Nigeria)
- Education
- Occupation: Politician

Abdullahi Taiwo Abdulrasheed (born September 29, 1971) is a Nigerian politician and member of the 8th assembly representing Owode/Onire constituency at the Kwara State House of Assembly.
