= Ali Ahmad (lawyer) =

Nigerian politician and lawyer (born 1965)

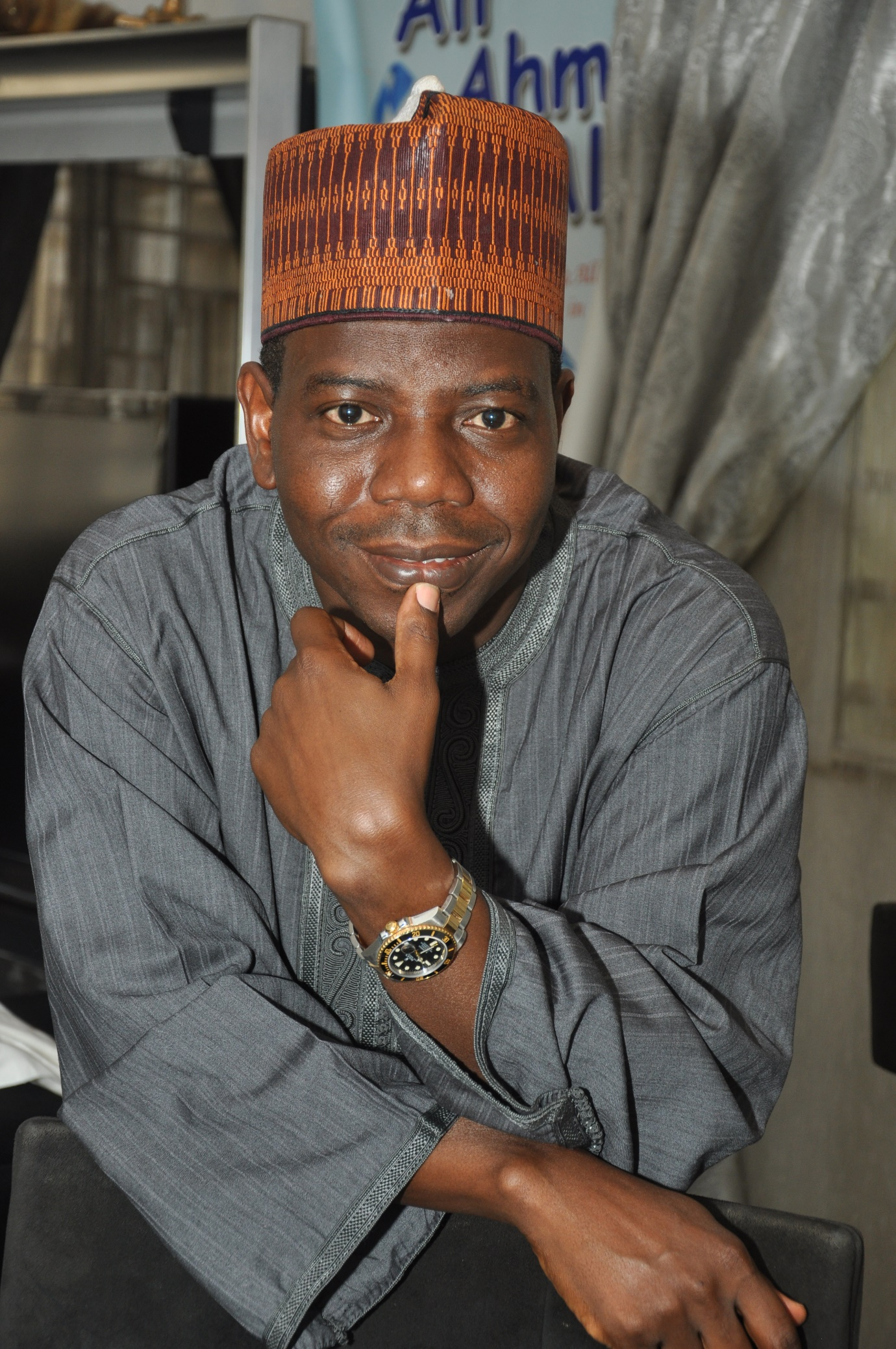

Speaker, 8th Kwara State House of Assembly
- In office 8 June 2015 – 7 June 2019
- Deputy: Mathew Okedare
- Preceded by: Abdurazaq Atunwa
- Succeeded by: Yakubu Danladi Salihu

Member, 7th House of Representatives, Ilorin East/Ilorin South
- In office 8 June 2011 – 7 June 2019
- Preceded by: Abdul-Wahab Oladimeji Isa
- Succeeded by: Abubakar Amuda Kannike

Attorney-General, Kwara State
- In office 2010–2011
- Preceded by: Saka Abimbola Isau, SAN
- Succeeded by: Kamal Ajibade, SAN

Personal details
- Born: 23 November 1965 (age 60) Kaduna, Nigeria
- Party: Peoples Democratic Party
- Other political affiliations: All Progressives Congress
- Parent: Ahmad Tijjani Ali (Father)
- Education: Bayero University, Kano; Harvard Law School; George Washington University Law School
- Profession: Lawyer, scholar and politician

Ali Ahmad (born November 23, 1965) is a Nigerian lawyer, scholar, and politician. Currently, he is a professor of law at the University of Abuja, Nigeria. His academic career started in 1990 at Bayero University, Kano, Nigeria, and included positions at Emory University School of Law, Atlanta, Georgia, USA, the University of Ilorin, and Baze University, Abuja, Nigeria. He has practiced law in Nigeria and New York City, United States.

Ali's political career started as a special assistant to the then Governor of Kwara State, Dr. Abubakar Bukola Saraki, in 2005. He was elected to Nigeria's 7th House of Representatives in 2011, representing Ilorin East/Ilorin South Federal Constituency. He moved to the All Progressives Congress (APC) in 2013 and was appointed a member of the Governing Council of the National Institute for Legislative and Democratic Studies in 2012.

Under the APC, he contested and won a seat to represent Ilorin South at the Kwara State House of Assembly during the 2015 Nigerian General Elections. He was elected Speaker of the 8th Kwara State House of Assembly. In company with his political group, he moved back to PDP in July 2018. During the gubernatorial primaries of the same year in which he fully participated, he had to step down from the contest to maintain party cohesion, even as he was the candidate to beat.

During the 2023 Nigerian General Election, Ali was appointed and inaugurated by the leader of the party as the Director-General of the gubernatorial campaign council of PDP in Kwara State, which the party lost.

Ali played a key role in the moulding and establishment of the Kwara State University, Malete, during the administration of Governor Saraki in his capacity as Secretary of the Feasibility Committee as well as Secretary of the Planning Committee and the Steering Committee in 2009.

== Early life and education ==
Ali Ahmad was born to the family of Sheikh Ahmad Tijjani Ali, an Islamic scholar from Ilorin on 23 November 1965. He had his primary education in Makera, Kaduna South Local Government of Kaduna State, Nigeria.

He later graduated from Arabic Teachers' College, Jebba, Kwara State in 1984. He studied law at the Bayero University, Kano where he clinched the Chief Justice of Nigeria Prize for the Best Graduating Student in 1988. He was called to the Bar in Nigeria in 1989. He also obtained a Master in Business Administration Degree at the same University in 1996. He then went to the United States, where he had his Master of Laws (LL.M.) at the Harvard Law School, Cambridge, M.A., USA in 1997, and his Doctor of Juridical Science (SJD) at George Washington University Law School, Washington, D.C. in 2000. He was also called to the Bar in New York in 1998. He speaks Arabic, English, Hausa and Yoruba fluently. He is married to Kubra Bola Ahmad (nee Mahmoud) and they have four children.

== Career in academia ==
In 1990 Ali Ahmad, a scholar with a substantial scholarly interest in the relationship among the three arms of government in Nigeria, joined his alma mater, Bayero University, as an Assistant Lecturer and in a period of 13 years rose to the rank of Associate Professor/Reader in 2003. He left Bayero University for the University of Ilorin and later Baze University, Abuja and acted as Dean of Law in all three. Currently, he is a Professor at the Public Law Department of the University of Abuja. He has taught Comparative Constitutional Law and Legislative Practice, Law of Treaties, International Environmental Law and Islamic Law, among others.

His interest has always been in the comparative study of Public Law due to his background in both Islamic Law and Common Law, as well as in United States and Nigerian laws. Specifically, he started out focusing on Environmental Law. He was a Visiting Scholar at the Environmental Law Institute, Washington, DC., in 2000 and at the Emory University School of Law, Atlanta, Georgia, USA in 2002. However, due to his subsequent involvement in government, he later turned towards legislative studies and Comparative Constitutional Law with a particular focus on the tensions in the interrelationship between the three arms of government as the doctrine of Separation of Powers epitomises.

He is widely published in local and international peer-reviewed journals. Many of his works have enjoyed wide citations by other scholars as captured by the ratings on Google Scholar and other platforms. He also attended several high-level conferences, including the 2002 United Nations Conference on Sustainable Development in Johannesburg, South Africa (the Earth Summit of 2002).

== Law practice ==
In 1989, Ali Ahmad began the practice of law in Kaduna, Kaduna State, Nigeria with the law firm of Moshood Oredola & Co. A year later and together with some of his colleagues, he established Al-Nas Law Consult, and subsequently his firm, Ali Ahmad & Co in Kano, Kano State. After he was called to the Bar in New York City in 1998, he practised law there briefly. It was while in New York that he initiated a public-interest class action lawsuit, partnering with Milberg Weiss, LLP of New York (now Milberg, PLLC), against Pfizer, Inc. in 2002. The case was about unconsented experimentation of a new drug (trovan) on several children in Kano, Nigeria resulting in 11 accountable deaths and other forms of disabilities. The plaintiffs proved that they suffered grave injuries from an experimental drug administered by Pfizer in 1996 without their informed consent. Abdullahi v Pfizer has become a celebrated case and has re-focused the world's attention on big pharma's penchant for unconsented drug trials in developing countries. The New York lawsuit inspired several other cases filed in Nigeria arising out of the same Pfizer's Kano drug trial. In 2009 Pfizer settled the U.S. case and paid compensation to the victims.

== Member House of Representatives ==
The Right Honourable Ali Ahmad was a member of Nigeria's House of Representatives (7th Assembly 2011—2015) where he chaired the Committee on Justice. He represented Ilorin South/ Ilorin East Federal Constituency on the platform of the Peoples Democratic Party (PDP). However, due to the intra-party squabble of the time, he was among the 37 members of the House of Representatives that moved from the PDP to the All Peoples Congress, in 2013. On the floor of the Assembly, he not only emerged as the Representative with the highest number of sponsored bills to his credit (36 in all) but was also the sole sponsor of the Administration of Criminal Justice Act, 2015, a federal law that was dubbed "revolutionary" by the Chief Justice of Nigeria at the time, Justice Aloma Mukhtar. Different versions of the Act have been modified and passed by all but three States of the Federation.

Ali was also a prominent member of the famed Committee on Fuel Subsidy Scam, chaired by Hon Farouk Lawan. The Committee's report prepared the grounds for indictment, prosecution and conviction of notable persons and companies involved in the scandal. Although the Committee itself was embroiled in a bribery scandal leading to the suspension and prosecution of its Chairman, Hon. Ahmad was untainted. Many of his legislative activities, such as motions, comments attracted front-page coverage in national newspapers and television shows and discussions.

== Speaker, Kwara Stacte House of Assembly ==
In 2015, Ali Ahmad was elected into the Kwara State House of Assembly to represent Ilorin South. His colleagues unanimously elected him Speaker to lead the 8th Kwara State House of Assembly. The Assembly was the first to debate and pas the constitutional amendment dubbed the Not-too-young-to-rule Bill, meant to reduce the age limit for running for elective offices in Nigeria. He became an Ambassador to the movement for the passage of the Bill, which has now become law. He led the Assembly to maintain a robust relationship with the Administration of Governor Abdulfatah Ahmed. At the same time, he demonstrated commitment to upholding the principle of power separation, resisting overtures of the executive in appropriate circumstances, and always deferring to the Constitution of Nigeria even where situations warranted wider legislative-executive confrontation. Governor Abdulfatah Ahmed was succeeded by a hostile administration of Governor AbdulRahman AbdulRazaq, who accused the Ali Ahmad-led Assembly of misappropriation of phantom billions of Naira, but the accusation did not get beyond harassment. He continues to maintain an outreach office for all members of his constituency irrespective of political leanings. Remarkable activities of the Assembly included:

Being the first Kwara State House of Assembly in the legislative history of Kwara State to introduce and pass private member's bills, such as The Community Health Insurance Scheme Law 2017 and People With Disabilities Law 2017;

placing an embargo on the imposition of additional taxes and levies; accordingly, an Executive Bill, the Kwara State Public Infrastructure Maintenance Levy Bill, 2016 was negatived;

budget performance witnessed an incremental rise for the first time in several years, recording an unprecedented 68% in 2016; after neglect for over ten years and the loss of lives of thousands of Nigerians along the notorious Jebba—Ilorin Federal Highway, he convinced the neighbouring Niger State House of Assembly to hold a symbolic joint session with the Kwara State House of Assembly at the most dangerous spot of the Highway, where the two Assemblies passed resolutions calling on the Federal Ministry of Works to prioritise the reconstruction of the Highway and insert its funding in the year's ongoing federal budget. This novel step caught the attention of the authorities and the Highway was fully reconstructed the following year.

== Attorney-general of Kwara State ==
He was appointed the Attorney-General of Kwara State in 2010. The appointment was a brief one since he opted out to contest for a seat in the House of Representatives the following year and won. But as the Attorney-General, he left a legacy of beneficial working relationship between the Kwara State Executive and the Judiciary. He achieved progress in decongesting correctional centres in Kwara State and banned lay police officers from prosecuting criminal matters in any court. He also authored a monograph that renders in simple layman's language major laws and regulations applicable in the State. Titled Layman's Law, the monograph is being updated by subsequent Attorneys-General and is in its second edition.

== Representative cases ==
- Co-counsel: Co-Counsel: Abdullahi v. Pfizer, 562 F.3d 163; United States Court of Appeals, Second Circuit, 2009. Also Co-counsel: Abdullahi et al v. Pfizer, Civ. 8118 (WHP) (S.D.N.Y. Aug. 9, 2005), United States District Court for the Southern District of New York.
- Lead Counsel: Shurumo v State (2011) All FWLR (Pt. 568) 864-894; Supreme Court of Nigeria, 2011

== Representative motions and bills passed into laws ==
- Sole Sponsor, Administration of Criminal Justice Act, 2015
- Sole Sponsor, Oaths (Amendment) Act, 2017
- Sole Sponsor of motion warning President Goodluck Jonathan’s Administration of dire consequences from removing the uncompromising Chairman of the Electoral Umpire, Professor Attahiru Jega, immediately before the 2015 Nigerian general election

== Representative publications ==
- Relationship of the National Assembly with the Executive and Judicial Branches: Nigeria’s Experience Under the 1999 Constitution (Moldova Europe, Eliva Press, 2023) 255 pages.
- Law and Democratic Consolidation in Nigeria, (Abuja, Lawlords Publications, 2021) 336 pages.
- Educating Lawyers for Transnational Challenges, Journal of Legal Education, 55(4): 475-478 (Georgetown University Law Centre, Washington, DC. USA 2005).
- Islamic Water Law Law as an Antidote for Maintaining Water Quality, 2 University of Denver Water Law Review 169-188 (1999) .

== Awards ==
- He won the Justice Muhammed Bello (CJN) Prize for the Best Graduating Law Student at Bayero University, Kano.
- Recognised as one of the ten most influential lawyers from Kwara State at that time, he was one of the “50 Top Young Professionals in Northern Nigeria Award” in 2015 by the Leadership Newspaper Group.
- The Mac Arthur Foundation also bestowed on him the Outstanding Legislator Award for his role in the enactment of the Administration of Criminal Justice Act, 2015.
- He was also awarded Lawmaker of the Year in 2016.
- In recognition of his role in the passage of the same Act, a book was also written in his honour titled The Challees of Criminal Justice Administration in Nigeria, written by Oluseyi Adetanmi, Esq. in 2017.
