= Ganiyu Folabi Salahu =

Nigerian politician (born 1962)

The Honourable Ganiyu Folabi Salahu

Member of the Kwara State House of Assembly
- Incumbent
- Assumed office 18 March 2023

Member of the Kwara State House of Assembly from Falokun-Oja , Ilorin East Local Government
- Incumbent
- Assumed office 18 March 2023
- Constituency: Omupo Constituency

Personal details
- Born: 3 February 1962 (age 64) Falokun-Oja, Ifelodun Local Government Kwara State Nigeria
- Party: All Progressive Congress
- Education: Usman Danfodiyo University
- Alma mater: Usman Danfodiyo University
- Occupation: Politician; Legal Practitioner

Ganiyu Folabi Salahu is a Nigerian legal practitioner and politician. He represents Omupo constituency in the 9th and 10th Assembly of Kwara State House of Assembly.

== Early life ==
Ganiyu was born on 3 February 1962 in Falokun-Oja. He studied law at Usman Danfodio University for his bachelor's degree between 1991 and 1996 and he joined the Nigeria Bar in 1998.

== Career ==
Ganiyu is a certified and practising teacher. He started teaching at Onitolo Community High School, Onitolo, Lagos, in 1986. He practiced for two years before he entered the bar in 1998. He started his legal practice in 1998. He won an election to represent Omupo constituency in 2019 general election and was reelected in 2023 under the platform of All Progressive Congress.
