= Motunrayo Alaka =

Nigerian activist

Motunrayo Famuyiwa-Alaka
- Born: 25 May 1981 (age 44)
- Education: MA Diplomacy and Strategic Studies, BSc Political Science
- Occupation: Communication Strategist
- Employer: Wole Soyinka Centre for Investigative Journalism

Motunrayo Alaka (born 25 May 1981) is a Nigerian communication strategist, writer, gender advocate, and pastor.

== Education ==
Alaka has a Master's degree in Diplomacy and Strategic Studies from the University of Lagos, and a Bachelor's in Political Science from the Ekiti State University formerly known as the University of Ado-Ekiti.

She became a Stanford University Draper Hills fellow in 2018. She is also a John S. Knight Journalism fellow (class of 2019–2020), being one of the seven journalists selected from across the world for the Stanford University journalism fellowship. She was one of the two Africans who made the list and she was the only Nigerian selected.

== Career ==
Between 2008 and 2018, Alaka served as the first Coordinator of the Wole Soyinka Centre for Investigative Journalism which was established in 2005 in furtherance of investigative journalism. She currently serves as the executive director and chief executive officer of the centre, a position she assumed in 2019. She is also a board member of the Centre for Collaborative Investigative Journalism, a not-for-profit media organization.
