= Kwara State University of Education, Ilorin =

Nigeria college of education

Kwara State University of Education
- Type: Public
- Established: 1974
- Academic affiliations: University of Ilorin
- Location: Illorin, Kwara State, Nigeria; 8.47537°N 4.52750°E
- Campus: Urban

Kwara State University of Education, Ilorin was established in September 1974 by the Kwara State Government. The university is located in the city of Ilorin, the capital of Kwara State in Nigeria.

== History ==
The university started as School of Education and was administered by the Kwara State College of Technology (now Kwara State Polytechnic). The university was subsequently changed to an Advanced Teachers' College. By 1976, it was completely detached from Kwara College of Technology and formally named Kwara State College of Education to be sited in Oro. The college moved to a temporary site in Ilorin and was affiliated to Ahmadu Bello University, Zaria. At the college's 1980 convocation, the Governor of Kwara State, Alhaji Adamu Attah declared that it would remain in Ilorin. It was then re-affiliated to the University of Ilorin. July 31, 2024, Nigerian University commission recognizes the change of name and program for the institution as proposed by the state governor, Abdulrahman Abdulrazaq from college of education to a university.

== Governing council and management ==
The Governing Council of the institution is the policy making organ of the University. It is headed by a Chairman and other members are drawn from different sectors of the society. Besides the governing council, the University also has management which runs the University. The management is headed by a Provost. The current provost is Prof AbdulRaheem Yusuf.

== History ==
The institution was originally named Kwara State College of Education, Ilorin, as at November 2024. In November 2024, it was upgraded to a university and renamed Kwara State University of Education following approval by the Kwara State Government and NUC.

== Staffing ==
The University which was a teacher training College of Education, Kwara state college of education and now Kwara state University of Education started with 13 staff. The University now has hundreds of academic and non-academic staff.

== Academic programmes ==
The University runs the following academic programmes:

- B.Ed
- B.Tech.Ed
- BSc.Ed. The College was temporarily stopped by the state government from admitting NCE students. That decision has been reversed
- Regular Degree (B.A. Ed, B.Ed) in Affiliation with Ekiti State University
- Sandwich Degree (B.A Ed, B.Ed) in Affiliation with Ekiti State University
- Diploma in Computer Science
- Certificate in Computer Science
- P.D.E (Professional Diploma in Education)
- Diploma in the Teaching of Arabic and Islamic Studies
- Diploma in the Teaching of Christian Religious Studies
- I.J.M.B in Affiliation with Ahmadu Bello University, Zaria.
