= Higher National Certificate =

Education qualification in the UK

A Higher National Certificate (HNC), part of the Higher Nationals suite of qualifications, is a higher education/further education qualification in the United Kingdom.

== Overview ==
In England, Wales and Northern Ireland, the HNC is a BTEC qualification awarded by Edexcel, and in Scotland, an HNC is a Higher National awarded by the Scottish Qualifications Authority. The attainment level of the qualification is roughly equivalent to 6th year at school, or one year of university in Scotland, and a Certificate of Higher Education but being less extensive than that of a Higher National Diploma (HND). Studied full-time, the qualification normally takes one year or two years part-time. Many HNCs cover the same areas as an HND and it is often possible to complete an HND with one year full-time study after successfully completing the HNC.

In England, Wales and Northern Ireland, an HNC (previously a level 5 qualification) is now Level 4 on the Regulated Qualifications Framework.

In Ireland, an HNC is considered roughly equivalent to a FETAC level 6 Advanced Certificate; as both contain at least 8 modules/units at IRL level 6 (UK level 4)

In Scotland, an HNC is Level 7 on the Scottish Credit and Qualifications Framework.
