= General National Vocational Qualification =

Certificate of vocational education

- Acronym: GNVQ
- Year started: 1990
- Year terminated: 2007
- Offered: Normally Sixth Form
- Regions: England, Wales and Northern Ireland

A General National Vocational Qualification, or GNVQ, was a certificate of vocational education in the United Kingdom. The last GNVQs were awarded in 2007.

The qualifications related to occupational areas in general, rather than any specific job. They could be taken in a wide range of subjects. There were different levels of GNVQ, namely the Intermediate level (equivalent to four General Certificates of Secondary Education) and Advanced level (equivalent to two Advanced-level General Certificates of Education).

GNVQs were available to people of all ages. Many schools and colleges offered these courses and they could be studied alongside GCSEs or A levels. The GNVQ generally involved much coursework (6-8 large assignments), which allowed holders to show their skills when applying for jobs.

GNVQs were used in many schools in Wales in three main subjects: Engineering, Health and Social Care, and Leisure and Tourism. They were commonly used between early 2000 and 2005 as one-year courses for post-GCSE students who wished to further their education within the sixth-form but not at an A-Level standard. The course was generally undertaken in Wales at Intermediate level with day-release at an appropriate work placement during school hours for the duration of the year. Subsequent to 2005 many schools stopped using GNVQ courses in the sixth form and after 2004 incorporated Intermediate or Foundation level GNVQs into the syllabus in years 10 and 11 along with GCSEs. This was to encourage more students to undertake vocational areas of study as part of their compulsory education. The majority of one-year courses for sixth formers were then replaced with BTEC First Diplomas and Certificates.

GNVQs ceased to be offered in late 2007. Pupils in England and Wales are able to undertake BTEC and OCR national certificates and diplomas instead. Alternatives to GNVQ qualifications include vocational GCSEs, BTEC diplomas and certificates, OCR Nationals and City and Guild progression awards. The Diploma in Digital Applications, launched in 2005, was seen as a successor to GNVQ ICT, however many centres quickly switched to the equivalent OCR National qualification due to issues with DiDA's assessment format.
