= Salihu Yakubu-Danladi =

Speaker of the Kwara State House of Assembly

Speaker of the Kwara State House of Assembly
- Incumbent
- Assumed office 11 June 2019
- Preceded by: Ali Ahmad
- Constituency: Ilesha-Gwanara

Member of the Kwara State House of Assembly
- Incumbent
- Assumed office 2019
- Constituency: Ilesha-Gwanara

Personal details
- Born: May 31, 1985 (age 41) Gwanara, Kwara State, Nigeria
- Party: All Progressives Congress
- Education: Kaduna Polytechnic; Federal University of Technology, Minna
- Occupation: Politician, engineer
- Profession: Electrical and electronic engineering

Salihu Yakubu-Danladi (born 31 May 1985) is a Nigerian engineer and politician who was elected speaker of the 9th Kwara State House of Assembly in 2019. He was again reelected in 2023.

Yakubu-Danladi is a second-time member of the state assembly, elected on the platform of the All Progressives Congress to represent Ilesha-Gwanara in Baruten state constituency. In May 2026, he emerged as the All Progressives Congress (APC) governorship candidate in Kwara State for 2027 general elections.

== Early life and education ==
Yakubu-Danladi was born in Gwanara, Baruten LGA , Kwara State, on 31st May 1985, to the family of the late sage and renowned educationist, Alhaji Aliyu Salihu Gwanara. His early education began in 1988 at Baruten Local Government Education Authority School (BLGEA) where he earned First School Leaving Certificate 1993. He completed his Senior School Certification Examination (SSCE) at the St. Anthony Secondary School, Ilorin, Kwara State in 2001. Danladi attended Kaduna Polytechnic College where he received a National Diploma (ND) and Higher National Diploma (HND) in Electrical and Electronic Engineering between 2003 and 2008 while he earned a bachelor's degree in Electrical and Electronic Engineering from Federal University of Technology, Minna.

== Career ==
=== Politics ===
In the year 2011, he was the Kwara North Coordinator of the Buhari Campaign Organisation, BCO when President Muhammad Buhari contest the presidential election under the platform of the Congress of Progressive Change, CPC. And in the year 2015, he was the Kwara North Youth Coordinator for Engr. Yinusa Yahaya (Bulldozer) Campaign Organisation under the platform of the Peoples Democratic Party, PDP for the 2015 general election.

Hon Danladi-Salihu worked as a staff of FUT Minna between 2010-2018 before he voluntarily resigned having demonstrated competence, astuteness, and shrewd leadership skills to answer the call of his people to represent them. He contested the Ilesha-Gwanara state constituency seat at the Kwara State House of Assembly, KWHA under the platform of the All Progressives Congress APC in the 2019 general elections.

Since his election as the Ilesha-Gwanara state constituency representative and the Speaker of the 9th Kwara State Assembly, Rt. Hon. Engr. Danladi-Salihu has proven to be a 'game changer' and a new 'Sheriff in town' by providing quality legislation. Under his watch as the Speaker of the 9th Assembly, a total of about fifty (50) bills have been passed into law. Many motions have equally been critically debated and resolved, while a plethora of Matters of General Public Importance have been considerably discussed. In the area of quality representation, no less than 250 kilometers of roads have been given a face lift in his state constituency. In addition, in his attempt to ease water scarcity among his people, he was able to provide over three hundred boreholes and many classrooms and health centers were renovated. He furthered his representation to human capacity development of women and youth of his constituents. These and other salient achievements that are too numerous to mention are some of the reasons why he stands tall among his peers.
