= Federal Polytechnic, Offa =

Public polytechnic in Offa, Kwara State, Nigeria

Coordinates: 8.1326076°N 4.7109406°W

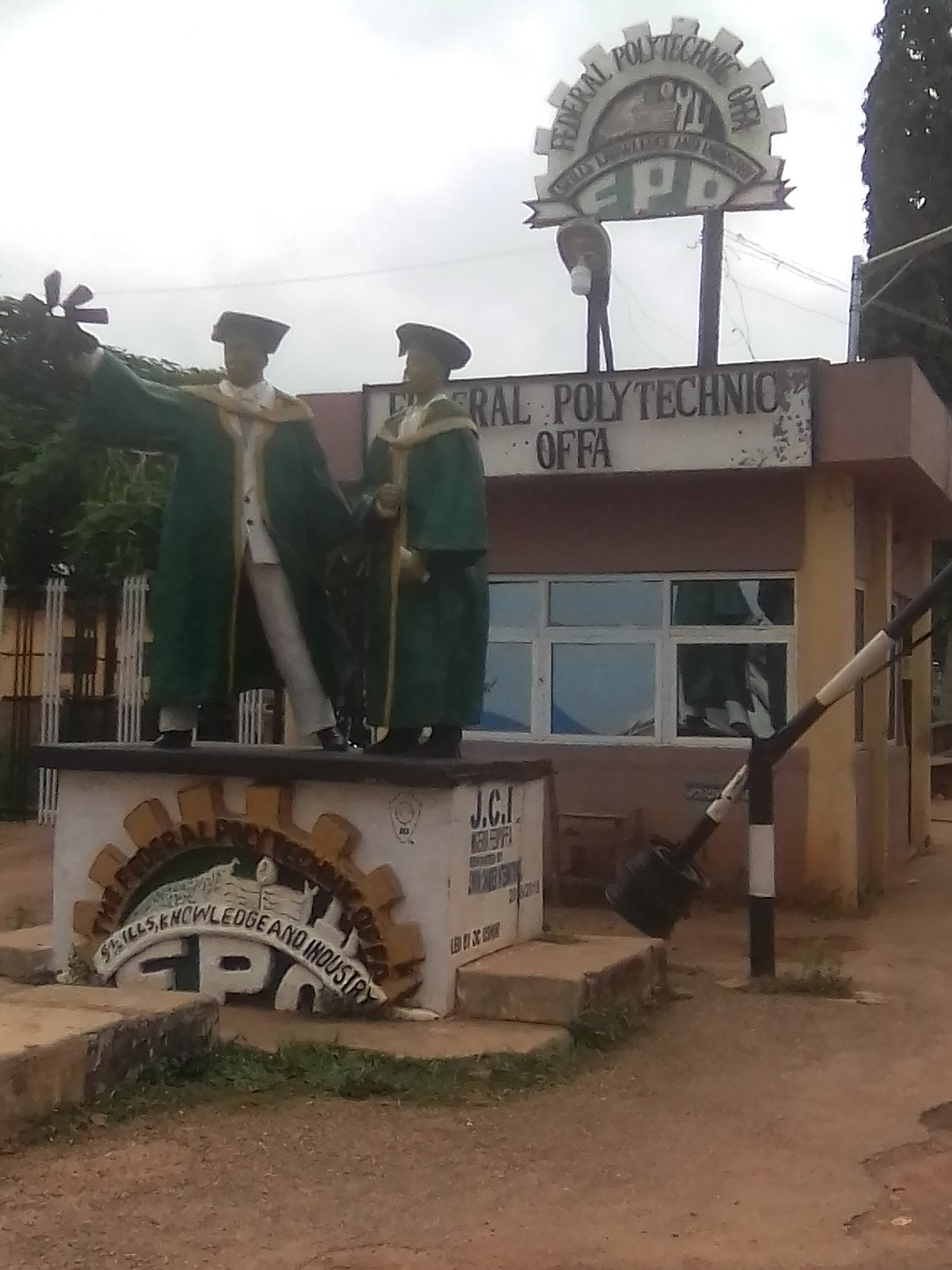
- The entrance of federal polytechnic offa
- Type: Public
- Established: 1992
- Religious affiliation: N/A
- Rector: Engr. Kamoru Kadiri Oluwatoyin
- Location: Offa, Kwara, Nigeria
- Campus: Urban
- Website: fedpoffaonline.edu.ng

The Federal Polytechnic, Offa is a Nigerian institution, and it came into existence in 1992. A presidential pronouncement of its establishment was made at the Palace of His Royal Highness, Olofa of Offa, late Oba Mustapha Olawoore Olanipekun Ariwajoye II, by the then Military President, Ibrahim Babangida during a state visit in 1991.

Consequently, a Local Task Force was then constituted by His Royal Highness, the Olofa, under the Chairman Alhaji Tiamiyu Olatinwo with six other eminent indigenes of Offa and Chief Ayotunde Raji as Secretary.

The pioneer Rector of the Polytechnic, Engr. (Mrs.) Taiwo Adeife Osemeikhian, administered the Polytechnic from February 1992 to year 2000, under the supervision of a Federal Task Force led by the Director of Science and Technology, Federal Ministry of Education. The Task Force was responsible for taking major policy decisions affecting the Polytechnic and performing the functions of the Governing Council. She handed over to Dr. Razaq Bello who was Rector between 2000 and 2006. Dr. Mufutau Olatinwo, took over the affairs of the Polytechnic in 2006 as Ag. Rector and later as the third substantive Rector since 2008.

The first Governing Council of the Polytechnic was put in place in year 2000, the second in 2005 the third in 2009 while the fourth and current council under the chairmanship of Chief Okey Ezenwa was inaugurated in April 2013. The polytechnic offers National Diploma and Higher National Diploma courses at undergraduate levels. It also offers Degree courses in affiliation with the Federal University of Technology, Minna, FUTMINA.

== The school offers six programmes ==
I. Financial Studies

II. Business Studies

III. Secretarial Studies

IV. Science Laboratory Technology

V. Electrical/Electronic Engineering

VI. Computer Science

During the COVID-19 pandemic in Nigeria, the polytechnic invented "solar-powered anti-COVID-19 machines".

== Notable alumni ==
Muhydeen Okunlola Kayode, Entrepreneur and philanthropist

== See also ==
- List of polytechnics in Nigeria
