= BTEC Extended Diploma =

Qualification

The BTEC (Business and Technology Education Council) Level 3 diploma is a Further Education qualification and vocational qualification taken in England, Wales and Northern Ireland. The qualification is organised and awarded by Pearson within the BTEC brand and it is equivalent to A-Levels. It is equivalent to the GCE A Levels, more specifically to three A2 awards (when studying for the BTEC Extended Diploma) and the AVCE.

This qualification is taken in order to gain entry to the vast majority of Higher Education providers. Nevertheless, as it is mostly coursework based, the University of Cambridge and the University of Oxford may require it to be combined with more traditional qualifications, typically studying for A-levels as well. It is the responsibility of the Parliamentary Under-Secretary of State for Apprenticeships and Skills in the Department for Education.

== Background ==
The BTEC Level 3 Extended Diploma dates back to the 1930s as a full-time three-year course. After the Haselgrave Report, the Business Education Council (BEC) and Technician Education Council (TEC) took over the accrediting of this qualification (called the "Ordinary National Diploma") and others in the stable, such as the National Certificate, Higher National Certificate and Higher National Diploma. The portfolio of courses was integrated when the BEC and TEC merged to form BTEC.

The BTEC (Business and Technology Education Council) was formed by the merger of the Business Education Council (BEC) and the Technical Education Council (TEC). The University of London Examinations & Assessment Council (ULEAC) and BTEC merged to form Edexcel. The Ordinary National Diploma is a vocational qualification at Level 3. It is a course that lasts two years and has 18 units altogether unlike the Advanced VCE that is only worth two (Double Award). This is often a very good alternative way to achieve A Levels in the UK, excluding parts of Scotland.

The course is available from Edexcel and is in many different subjects. This qualification is mainly studied in further education colleges and along with the right passes at GCSE, can qualify for university entry. As BTEC stands for Business and Technology Education Council, the best known subjects for a BTEC Level 3 Extended Diploma are Business and Information Technology. This qualification has become more popular recently, especially with the demise of the AVCE.

== Level ==
The BTEC Level 3 Extended Diploma is particularly suitable for those who have strong inclinations towards a particular vocational career, starting with technical level posts and leading, after experience, to supervisory and enterprise management posts. The BTEC Level 3 Extended Diploma is popular amongst school leavers who wish to pursue Nursing, Midwifery or other health professions as the BTEC Health course gives more thorough preparation than A Levels would for the degree course. The work placement element of the BTEC Level 3 Extended Diploma is particularly valued by universities considering admissions for these subjects.

The usual entry requirement is at least five GCSE subject passes at A*, A, B or C grades, covering English, Maths and Science. In most land-based industries, science (usually Double Science) will be a preferred subject, together with Maths and English. Equivalent entry qualifications are also accepted, including an appropriate BTEC First Diploma with a merit grade or a relevant NVQ at Level 2 or an Intermediate GNVQ.

Other qualifications and experience may be acceptable for mature students. Mature students are advised, in some cases, to consider a Higher National Diploma (HND) course instead. Career experience frequently leads to an ability to cope with HND level education and the two year commitment can be better spent in acquiring a higher qualification.

It is possible for a student to be accepted onto a BTEC Level 3 Extended Diploma course without the recommended entry requirements, this is generally the case in students who have left school and acquired a job in the field of the subject that is relevant to the course. If the college is satisfied that the student has the ability to benefit successfully from the course. Students with a good National Certificate or equivalent qualification may be considered for entry to the second year of the National Diploma course in which case "bridging" studies may be necessary.

== Subjects ==
BTEC qualifications are equivalent to other qualifications, such as the General Certificate of Secondary Education (GCSE) (levels 1 to 2), A Level (level 3) and university degrees (levels 6 to 7). BTECs are undertaken in vocational subjects ranging from Business Studies to Engineering.

=== Art and design ===
The subject alone is available. Other Art & Design BTEC Level 3 Extended Diplomas include 3D Design, Design Crafts, Fashion & Clothing, Fine Art, Graphic Design, Interactive Media, Photography and Textiles.

=== Business ===
There are in total 24 Business courses available as a BTEC Extended Diploma. The core subject is available alone, but other Business courses contain other concentrations such as Law and Marketing and Human Resources. Others Business courses include: Administration and eBusiness strategy. eBusiness software concentrations with Business courses are popular.

=== Construction ===
BTEC Extended Diploma in Construction and The Built Environment Level 3 (that teaches the basics of construction such as civil engineering and architecture), and Building Engineering Services are examples of BTEC Extended Diploma courses available in this subject.

=== Engineering ===
There are multiple disciplines of engineering available, such as: Aeronautical Engineering, Mechanical Engineering and Electrical Engineering.

=== Health and care ===
Health and Social Care, Early Years, Health Studies and Care are the main subjects under the Health and Care courses available. Health Science and Early Years are also available.

=== IT and computing ===
IT and Computing are becoming more popular in community colleges within the UK as the profession is becoming wider and more dominating in all aspects of society and business today. A computing course will usually cover a wide variety of subjects, in contrast to computer science which is focused more on the theoretical side of things. This course is a research-heavy course, meaning there is not much need to actually be taught the content; instead the student can simply use the internet, with the exception of certain modules (e.g. programming and databases).

=== Land-based subjects ===
Land-based subjects available include: Countryside management, Land-Based Technology, Agriculture, Animal Management, Horticulture and Blacksmithing with Metalworking. Other land-based courses can be found at the edexcel website.

=== Media, music and performing arts ===
There are 16 courses available under these 3 subjects. Some listed are: media production with games development, interactive media and radio; music production and music technology; performing arts with acting, dance, musical theatre and design.

=== Public services ===
The Level 3 Extended Diploma in public services is designed to prepare learners for employment in uniformed public services by providing the knowledge and skills that would benefit them in recruitment process and the service itself. It provides learners with the necessary education to join the uniformed public services in more responsible and challenging roles such as police officer or in the armed forces. The course covers subjects such as equality and diversity, citizenship, discipline, physical preparation for the uniformed public services, law and its impact on the society.

=== Science ===
All the subjects include one year of general science followed by units in specialist scientific fields such as applied science, forensic science, medical science, and dental technology.

=== Sport ===
For example, BTEC National Diploma in sports coaching and development, and qualifications in specific sports. The Diploma in Sporting Excellence (DiSE), which was introduced in 2018 and is aimed at talented sports performers, is also a level 3 qualification.

=== Travel and tourism ===
A whole list of other available subjects can be found at the BTEC Level 3 Extended Diploma Website.

== Progression ==
Possible outcomes include:

- Further training and employment
- Employment in, or leading to, enterprise management
- With further experience, business management
- Progression into a degree course
