= Kwara State Polytechnic =

Nigerian polytechnic

Coordinates: 8.593575°N 4.660868°E

Kwara State Polytechnic, Ilorin
- Motto: Technology, Innovation and Service
- Type: Public
- Established: 1973
- Rector: Engr. Dr Abdul Jimoh Muhammed
- Location: Ilorin, Kwara State, Nigeria
- Campus: Urban
- Website: kwarastatepolytechnic.edu.ng

Kwara State Polytechnic is a Nigerian tertiary institution that was established in 1973 by the then Military Governor of Kwara State Col. David Bamigboye after the decision to establish a polytechnic in Kwara State was announced in 1971. It is located in Ilorin, the capital of Kwara State.

In its vision and mission statements, Kwara State Polytechnic explains it aims "To be the foremost provider of Technological and Entrepreneurial skills" and to "Teach, impart and foster the highest level of intellectual development and provide services to humanity through the exploration of available scientific and research methods."

== History ==
Kwara State Polytechnic started with 110 pioneering students, and it offers National Diploma and Higher National Diploma in courses at undergraduate levels.

The College eventually came into existence following the promulgation of Kwara State Edict no. 4 of 1972 (now overtaken by the edict no. 21 of 1984 edict No. 13 of 1987 and edict no. 7 of 1994) as a body empowered by statute "to provide for studies, training, research and development of techniques in arts and language, applied sciences, engineering, management and commerce, education and well as in other spheres of learning".

The Kwara State Polytechnic formally commenced operation in January 1973 with an administrative machinery patterned closely after the existing universities in the country.

=== Rectors ===
Below is the list of Rectors from inception:

KWARA POLYTECHNIC LIST OF RECTORS
S/N	NAMES	PERIOD AS RECTOR	REMARK
1	Professor R.W.H. Wright	1973 – 1976	
2	Chief Zacchaeus Olorunfemi Mowaiye	1976 – 1978	Deceased
3	Dr. J.O. Amode	1978 – 1982	
4	Dr. Samuel Adeyemi Oladosu	1990 – 1997	Deceased
5	Dr. N.O. Oyeleke	1997 – 1998	
6	Professor M.A. Olatunji	1998 – 2002	
7	Dr. A.A. Saadu	2002 – 2004	
8	Dr. Abdulkareem Babaita	2004 – 2008	
9	Chief Ogunsola	2008–June 2009	
10	Alh. Masood Elelu	June 2009–June 2019	
11	Dr. Abdul Jimoh Mohammed	Oct 2019 –	

On 27 October 2019, Kwara State Polytechnic got a new Rector following the approval of the Kwara state Governor AbdulRahman AbdulRazaq. The Rector, Engr. Dr Abdul Jimoh Mohammed Succeeded Alhaji Mas'ud Elelu whose tenure ended in June 2019.

Dr Abdul Jimoh Mohammed was until his appointment Deputy Rector (Academics) at the Federal Polytechnic Offa, Kwara State. He holds two doctorate degrees, including one in Metallurgical and Material Science from Witwatersrand University South Africa in 2016.

== See also ==
- List of polytechnics in Nigeria
