= Higher National Diploma =

Higher education qualification of the United Kingdom

Higher National Diploma (HND), part of the Higher Nationals suite of qualifications, is an academic higher education qualification in the United Kingdom and various other countries. They were introduced in England and Wales in 1920 alongside the Ordinary National Diploma and the Higher National Certificate. A qualification of the same title is also offered in Argentina, Brunei, Cameroon, India, Malta, Nigeria, Ghana, Kenya and some other countries.

== Overview ==
=== England, Wales & Northern Ireland ===
In England, Wales and Northern Ireland, the HND is a qualification awarded by many awarding bodies, such as the Confederation of Tourism and Hospitality (CTH Advanced diploma), Scottish Qualifications Authority (SQA) and BTEC (vocational programmes). In Scotland, a Higher National is awarded by the Scottish Qualifications Authority (SQA). The attainment level is roughly equivalent to the second year of a 3-year English degree or to a Diploma of Higher Education. An HND takes two years of full-time study, or one year full-time following successful completion of a Higher National Certificate; part-time study takes longer.

=== Scotland ===
In Scotland, an HND is Level 8 on the Scottish Credit and Qualifications Framework and in England, Wales and Northern Ireland it is Level 5 on the Regulated Qualifications Framework/Credit and Qualifications Framework for Wales. It is quite common for those who have achieved an HND to add to their qualification by progressing to other levels such as professional qualifications, a degree or a "Top-Up" degree. The entry requirements for HND in these countries also differ. One does not require an OND to get into a HND programme in England, it is a stand-alone 2-year programme making the curriculum and course work different from that in some countries that offer HND degree as a progression of an OND degree.

=== Nigeria ===
In Nigeria, HND is a continuation of a National Diploma (ND-[equivalent to associate degree]) programme, both offered by polytechnics. The ND and HND programmes have a duration of two years each with one-year break after the ND programme for an Industrial Training (IT) attachment in relevant industries. At the completion of an HND programme, the graduate would have spent 4 to 5 years; hence, Higher National Diplomas are sometimes referred to "equivalent" of a University bachelor's degree or four years of a university education. Although, there have existed a long-standing disagreement over the "equivalence" of Polytechnic HND degree to University bachelor's degree; employers of labour (including the government and its policies) have discriminated against HND holders—grading them below their university counterparts and preventing them from attaining managerial or directorate cadres. However, following series of efforts by polytechnic students/lecturers and concerned entities, the federal government has made attempts to remove the dichotomy between Polythecnic HND degree holders and University degree holders in places of employment, and the efforts are paying off as some of the government organisations (especially paramilitary) have started upgrading and employing the HND-holders at par with their University Degree counterparts. Some have even claimed that the HND graduates are better than their university counterparts in the same field, arguing that they write the same entrance exams to seek admission to their course/programme of study (the JAMB exams to secure an admission), they both spend the same number of years studying, both completing 120 college credit units with HND holders concentrating more on technicalities, sometimes taking more than 120 credit units and getting more hands on. The HND degree offers limited liberal arts subjects and goes straight into the technicalities of a course using industry standards from year one of OND (one can only gain admission into a HND programme after completing two years of OND, an equivalent of an associate degree) and by the final year of HND the student is already equipped to practise in the field.

=== Malaysia ===
In Malaysia, the HND is considered equivalent to General Diploma Qualification. As the qualification is set ambiguously by old Public Service Department (Malaysia) standards, the HND graduate is set to fight the same with general diploma graduates especially in Malaysia Public University. The Malaysia HND graduates are advised to seek to continue with a UK degree or specialist university that is able to handle the HND qualification.

=== Cameroon ===
In Cameroon, the Higher National Diploma is a two-year professional university programme, which originated in the United Kingdom. It was introduced in Cameroon in 2002 by Ministerial Order No. 02/0069/MINESUP/DDES. In 2018, it underwent major curricula transformation and upgrade to meet contemporary job market needs. To earn the HND, students must complete the approved curriculum (including a research project and internship) by an institution of Higher Learning approved by the Ministry of Higher Education. At the end of the programme, students write a national examination organised each academic year by the Ministry of Higher Education through the National Committee for the Organization of Higher National Diploma (HND) Examinations.

== See also ==
- Diploma
- Higher diploma
- Professional certification
