= Kwara State House of Assembly =

Legislative arm of the government of Kwara State of Nigeria

- 10th Kwara State Assembly

Type
- Type: Unicameral
- Term limits: Nil

History
- Founded: August 30, 1979
- New session started: June 23, 2023

Leadership
- List of speakers of the Kwara State House of Assembly: Salihu Yakubu-Danladi (All Progressive Congress) since March 18, 2023
- Deputy Speaker: Ojo Olayiwola Oyebode since March 18, 2023
- Majority Leader: Oba Abdulkadir Magaji (All Progressive Congress)
- Deputy House Leader: Abdulraheem Medinat Motunrayo (All Progressive Congress)

Structure
- Seats: 24
- Political groups: Majority: All Progressive Congress (24)
- Length of term: 4 years
- Authority: section 4 subsections 6 and 7 of 1999 constitution ( as amended ) Nigeria Constitution

Elections
- Voting system: First-past-the-post
- Last election: March 18, 2023
- Next election: 2027

Meeting place
- CGWW+G6H, Asa-Dam Rd, Ilorin

Website
- Kwara State House of Assembly

The Kwara State House of Assembly is the legislative arm of the government of Kwara State of Nigeria. It is a unicameral legislature having 24 members elected from the 16 local government areas of the state. Local government areas with considerable lager population are delineated into two constituencies to give equal representation. This makes the number of legislators in the Kwara State House of Assembly 24.

The fundamental functions of the Assembly are to enact new laws, amend or repeal existing laws and oversight of the executive. Members of the assembly are elected for a term of four years concurrent with federal legislators (Senate and House of Representatives). The state assembly convenes three times a week (Tuesdays, Wednesdays and Thursdays) in the assembly complex within the state capital, Ilorin.

The current leaders of the 10th Kwara State House of Assembly is Salihu Yakubu-Danladi (Speaker) and Ojo Olayiwola Oyebode (Deputy Speaker). Oba Abdulkadir Magaji (House leader) and Abdulraheem Medinat Motunrayo (Deputy). Kareem Ahmed Olayiwola (Clerk).
