= Akanji =

- Gender: Male
- Language: Yoruba

Origin
- Origin: Nigerian
- Region of origin: South -West Nigeria

Akanji is a surname of Yoruba origin. Notable people with the surname include:

- Adebisi Akanji (born 1930s), Nigerian artist
- Manuel Akanji (born 1995), Swiss footballer
- Michael Akanji (born 1984), Nigerian sexual health and rights advocate
- Muideen Akanji (born 1992), Nigerian boxer
- Murphy Akanji (born 1977), Nigerian footballer
