= Abdullahi Bala =

Nigerian academic

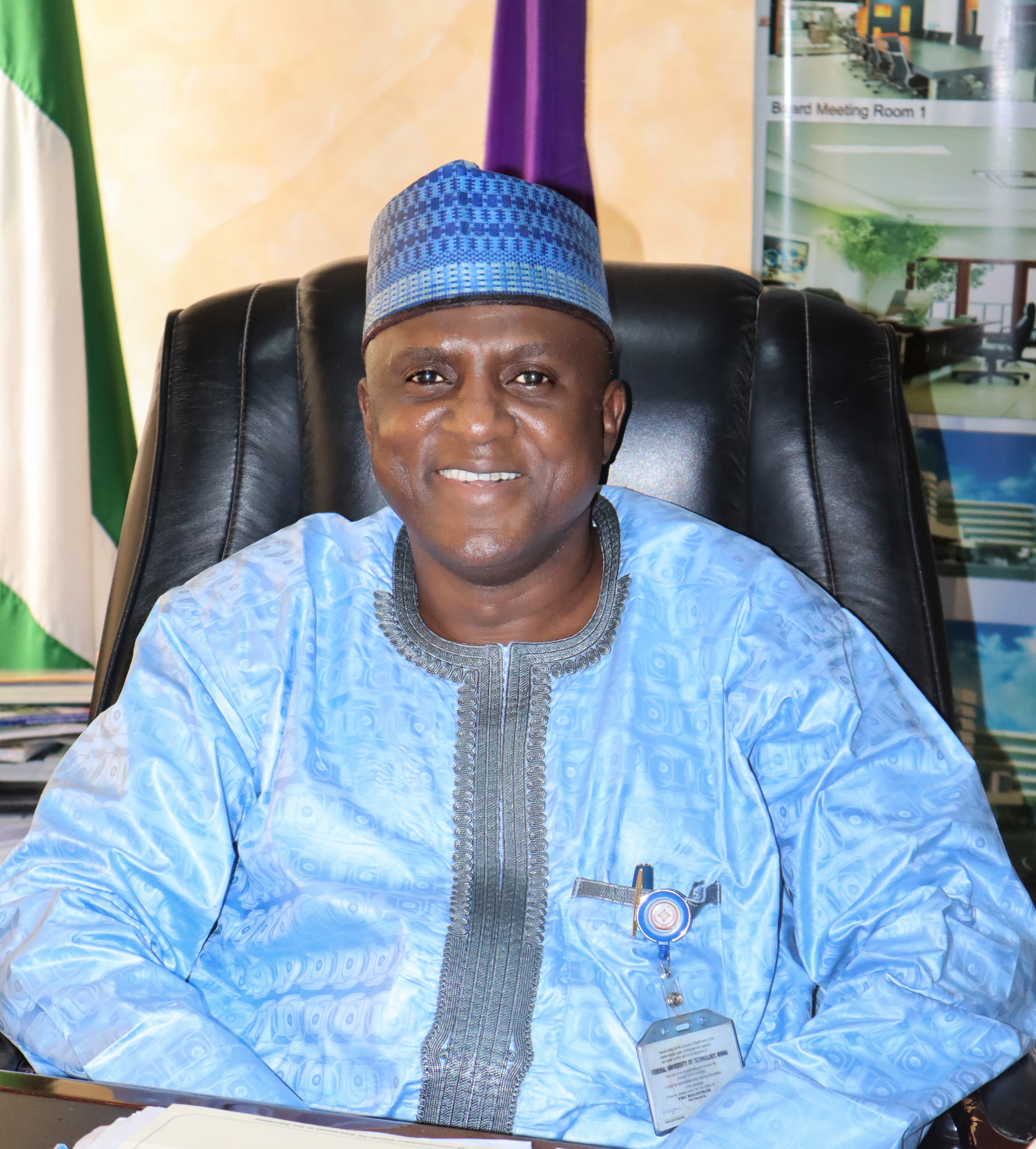

Vice-Chancellor of Federal University of Technology Minna
- Preceded by: Musibau Adewunmi Akanji
- Succeeded by: Faruk Adamu Kuta

Personal details
- Born: Abdullahi Bala; March 27, 1967 (age 59) Suleja, Niger State
- Education: University of Reading; Wye College
- Occupation: Academic; author
- Profession: Soil Microbiologist

Abdullahi Bala (born 1967) is a Nigerian academic, author and professor of soil science. He was vice-chancellor of the Federal University of Technology in Minna from 2017 to 2022.

Bala was born at Suleja, in Niger State. He obtained a Bachelor of Science from Ahmadu Bello University; a Master's Degree in soil chemistry at the University of Reading, and Doctorate in soil microbiology from Wye College.

Prior to being appointed vice chancellor he worked at the Independent Policy Group, Abuja; International Institute of Tropical Agriculture, Kano, and as Deputy Vice-Chancellor Academics at the Federal University of Technology.
