= Audu =

Audu is a Nigerian masculine given name and surname. Notable people with the name include:

== Given name ==
- Audu Bako (1924–1980), Nigerian governor
- Audu Bulama Bukarti (born 1984), Nigerian lawyer, public intellectual, and reform advocate
- Audu Sule Katagum (1956/57–2026), Nigerian politician, architect, and the Wazirin Katagum of Katagum
- Audu Maikori (born 1975), Nigerian lawyer, entrepreneur, social activist and public speaker
- Audu Mohammed (born 1985), Nigerian football player
- Audu Ogbeh (1947–2025), Nigerian playwright and politician
- Audu Idris Umar (born 1959), Nigerian senator

== Surname ==
=== Nigerians ===
- Abdulganiyu Audu, politician
- Abubakar Audu (1947–2015), governor
- Ado Dogo Audu, politician
- Esther Audu, actress
- Franca Audu, film and television producer
- Ishaya Audu (1927–2005), doctor and politician
- Jim Kwawo Audu, former member of the Nigerian National Assembly
- Judith Audu, film and television actress, presenter, model, blogger and movie producer
- Matthew Ishaya Audu, Catholic bishop
- Muhammed S. Audu, academic
- Musa Audu (born 1980), sprinter
- Seriki Audu (1991–2014), football player
- Shuaibu Audu, politician and banker
- Yohannah Audu, Anglican bishop of Damaturu, Nigeria

=== Others ===
- Reine Audu, 18th-century French fruit seller and revolutionary
- Zem Audu (fl. 2021–present), member of American rock band Bleachers
