= Offa Grammar School =

Public secondary school

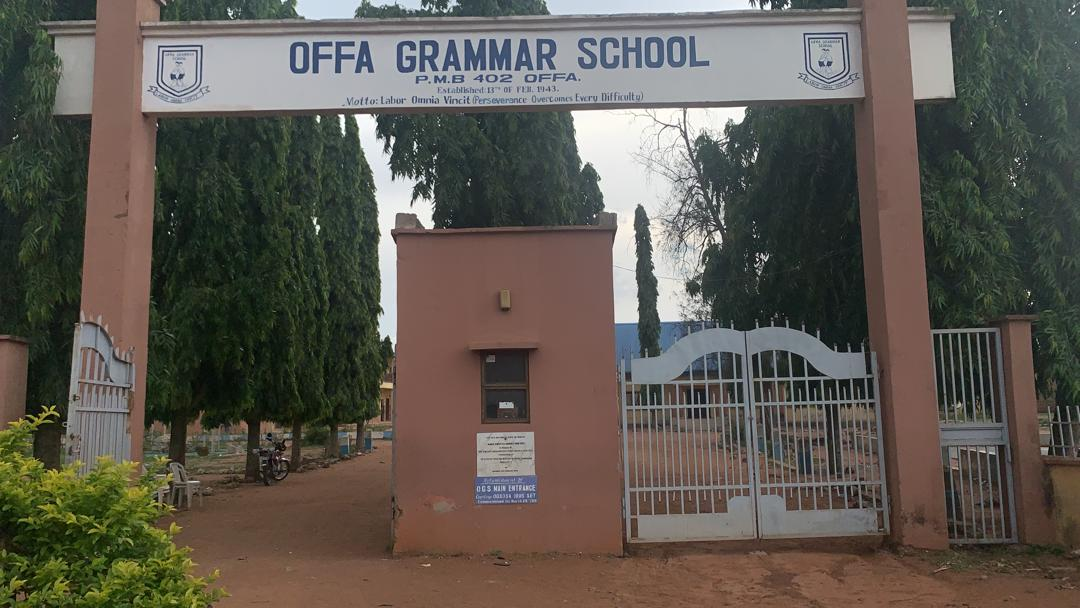
- Main entrance of Offa Grammar School
- Offa, Kwara State; Nigeria

Information
- Other name: OGS
- Type: Public secondary school
- Religious affiliation: Methodist (founding association)
- Established: 2 February 1943
- Founder: Offa community Offa Descendants Union (ODU)
- School board: Kwara State Ministry of Education
- Oversight: Kwara State Government
- Grades: JSS1–SSS3
- Gender: Co-educational
- Age range: 10–18
- Enrolment: Over 2,000 (approx.)
- Campus type: Urban
- Song: "Offa Grammar School Anthem"
- Nickname: OGS
- Alumni: Offa Grammar School Old Students' Association (OGSOSA)
- Website: www.offagrams.org

Offa Grammar School (OGS) is a public secondary school located in Offa, Kwara State, Nigeria. Founded on 2 February 1943, it is one of the oldest secondary schools in Kwara State and among the earliest community-established secondary schools in Northern Nigeria.

== History ==
The proposal to establish a secondary school in Offa emerged in the late 1930s following growing demand for post-primary education in the community. At the time, many pupils seeking secondary education travelled to schools outside the region, prompting local leaders to initiate plans for a community-owned institution

The school was established through the efforts of members of the Offa community: three Christians — Pa Abraham Oyediran, Pa Onawola, and Pa Bilewu — and with financial assistance from five Muslims: Alhaji Aliyu Olatinwo, Alhaji Gbadamosi Ijaiya, Alhaji Jatto, and Pa Oyeleke. It also received organizational support from the Offa Descendants Union (ODU) and the Methodist Mission. It officially commenced academic activities on 2 February 1943, with Reverend R. N. Ludlow serving as its first principal.

== Alumni association ==
Former students are represented through the Offa Grammar School Old Students' Association (OGSOSA), which supports the school through educational programmes, infrastructure projects, scholarships and anniversary activities.

== Notable alumni ==
- Ipoola Alani Akinrinade (rtd)- former chief of Army staff
- Lateef Fagbemi- Attorney General of the Federation
- Mosobalaje Oyawoye- the first Professor of Geology in Africa
- Josiah Sunday Olawoyin - the first Asiwaju of Offa
- Ibrahim Sulu-Gambari- Emir of Ilorin
- David Jemibewon - military governor of the now defunct Western State
- Emmanuel Olatunji Adesoye - second Nigerian Quantity Surveyor and the founder of Okin Biscuit, Okin Malt, and Okin Breweries
- Nazmat Surajudeen Bakinde- Vice Chancellor Gambia University
- Musibau Adewunmi Akanji - former Vice-Chancellor of Federal University of Technology, Minna
- Ayo Salami- Nigerian jurist and former President of the Nigerian courts of appeal.
- Dele Belgore - a Nigerian lawyer, arbitrator, and politician
- Joseph Abiodun Balogun - Nigerian-American academic
- Adogbajale-bi-ileke II - thirty third traditional ruler (king) of Olomu of Omu-Aran
- Salaudeen Latinwo - Nigerian Air Force and a military governor of Kwara State
- Sunday Afolabi - Minister of Internal Affairs

== Gallery ==
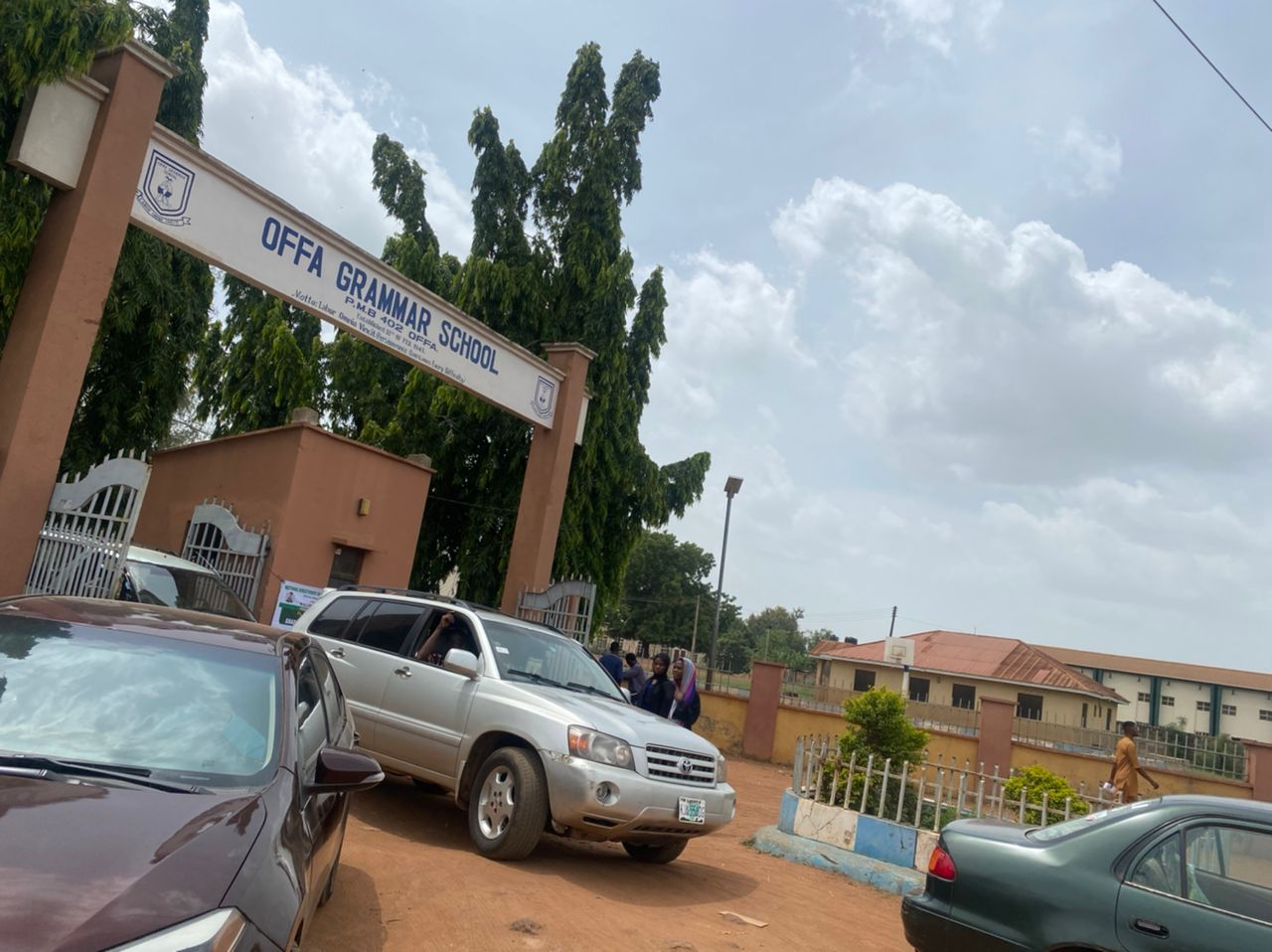
Main entrance of Offa Grammar School

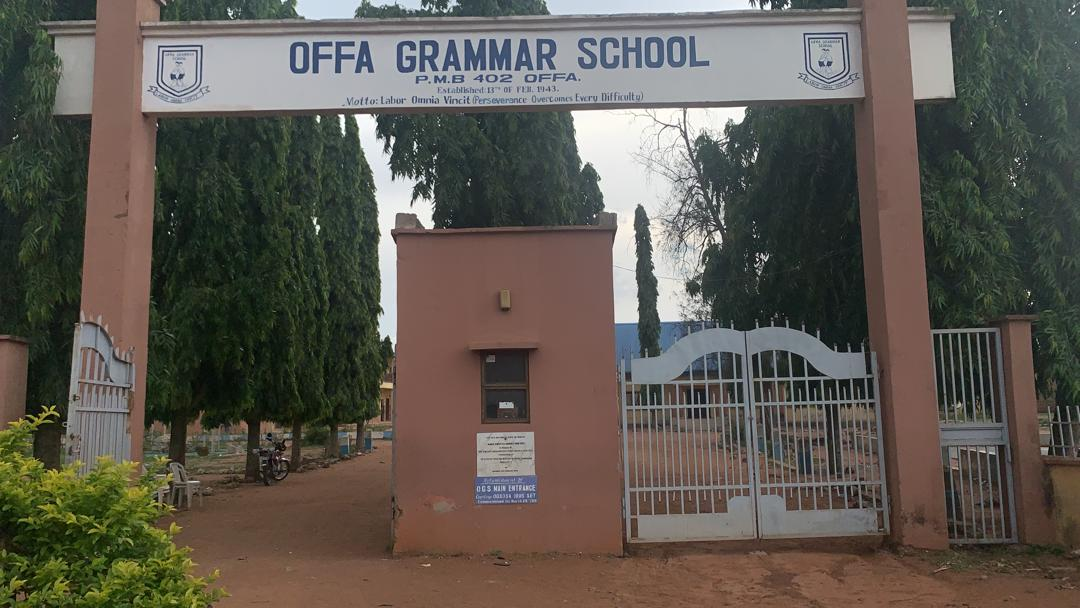
School entrance gate

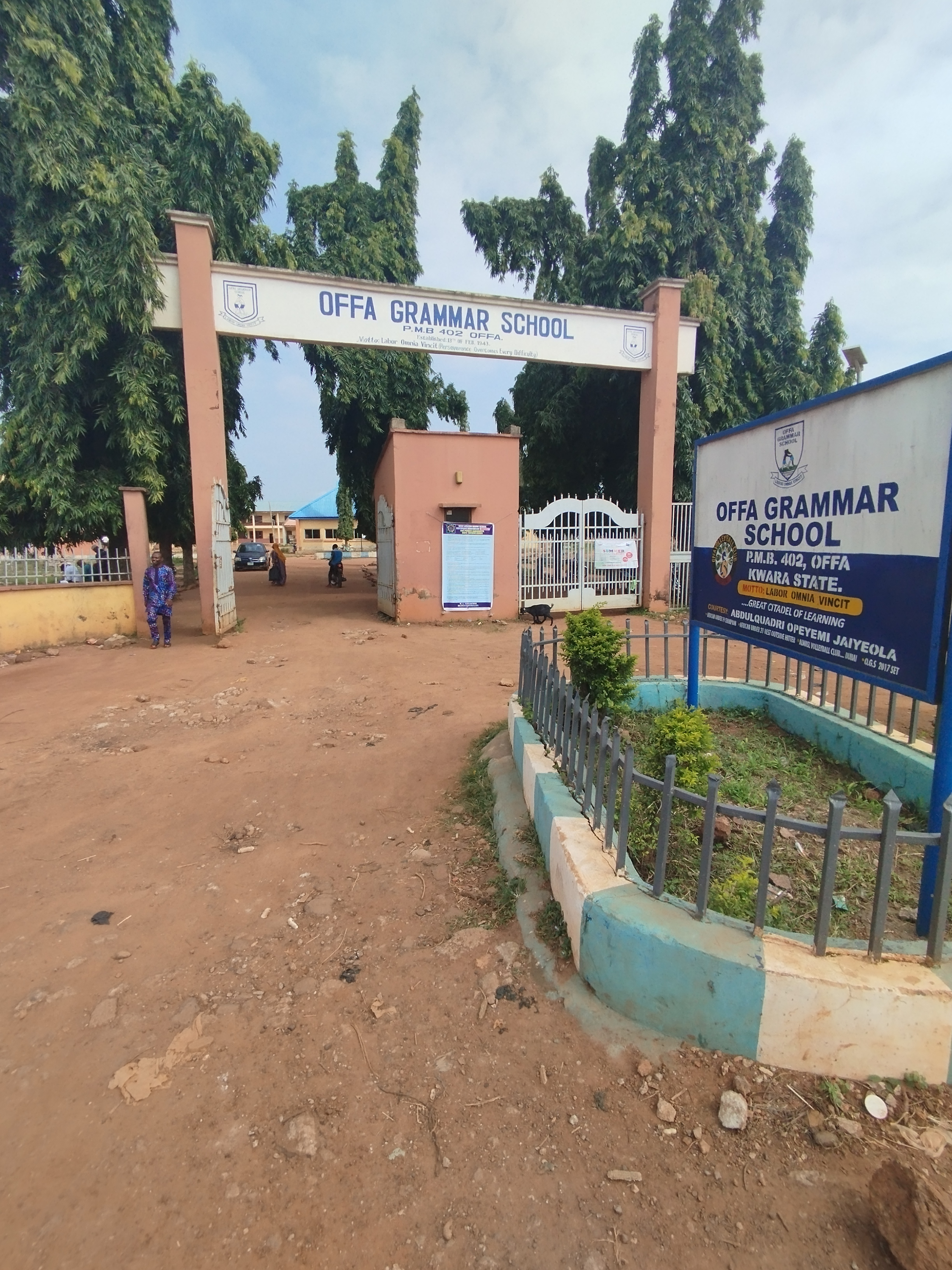
Front view of the school

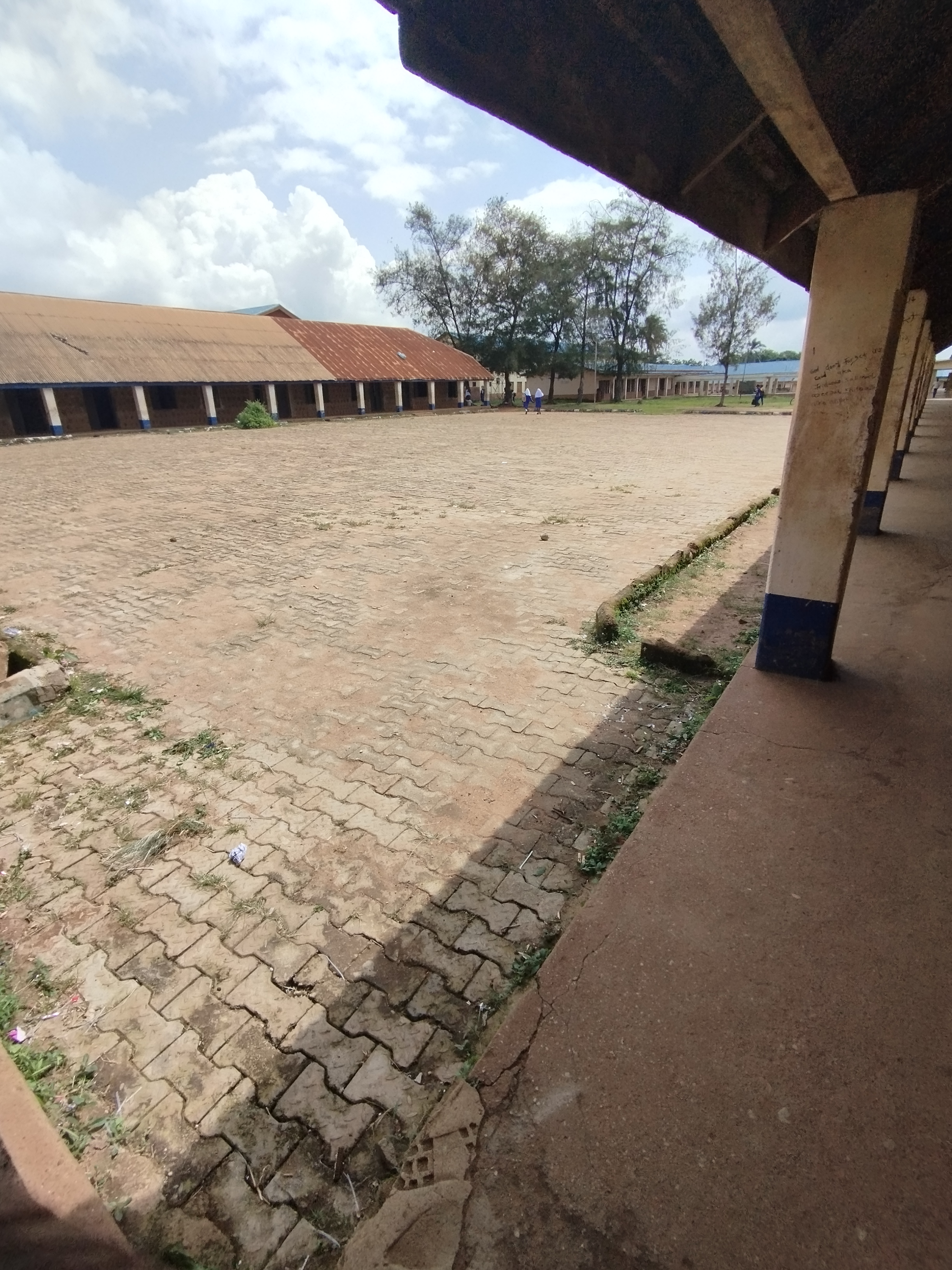
Senior Secondary assembly ground

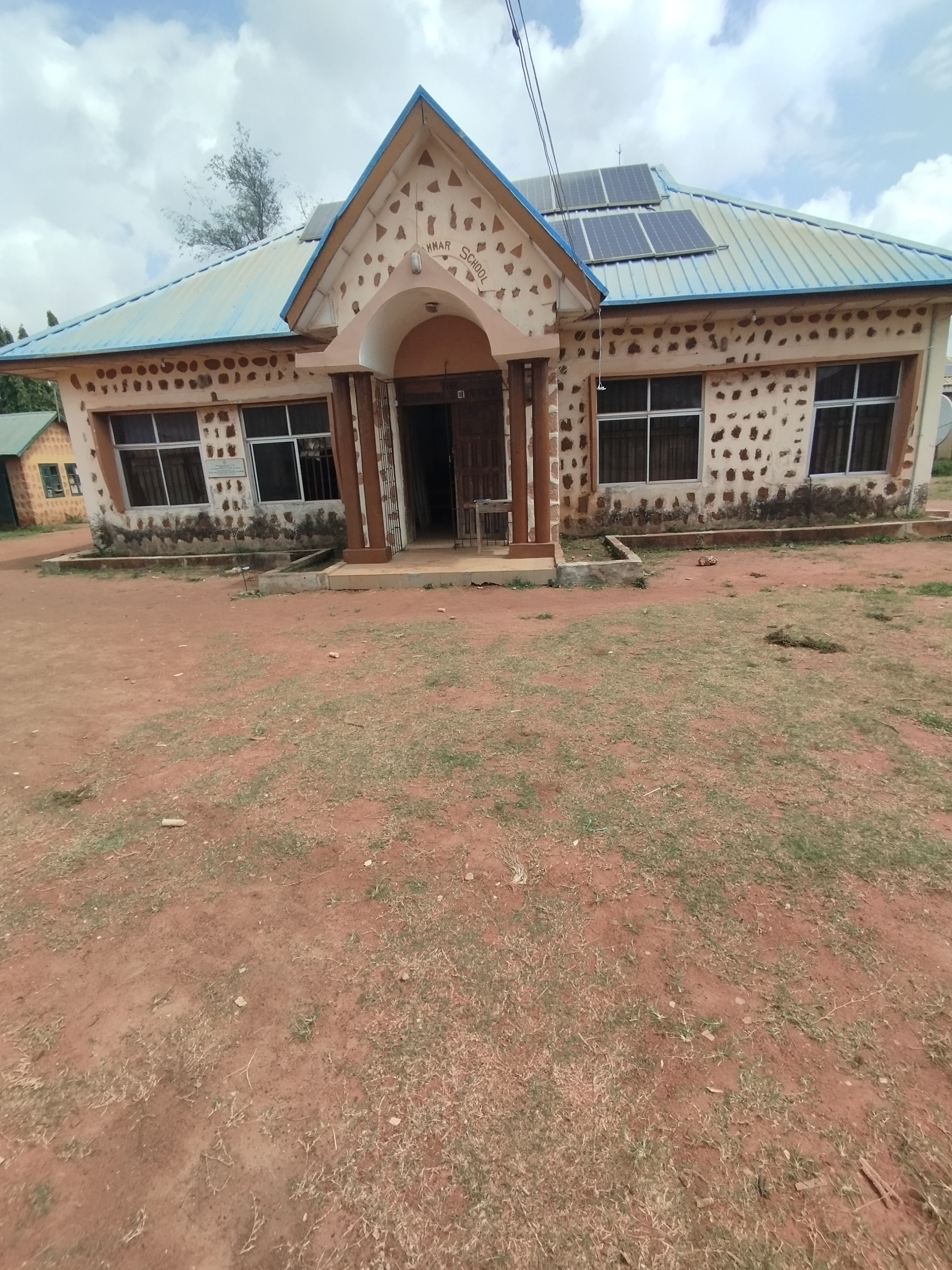
Principal's Office

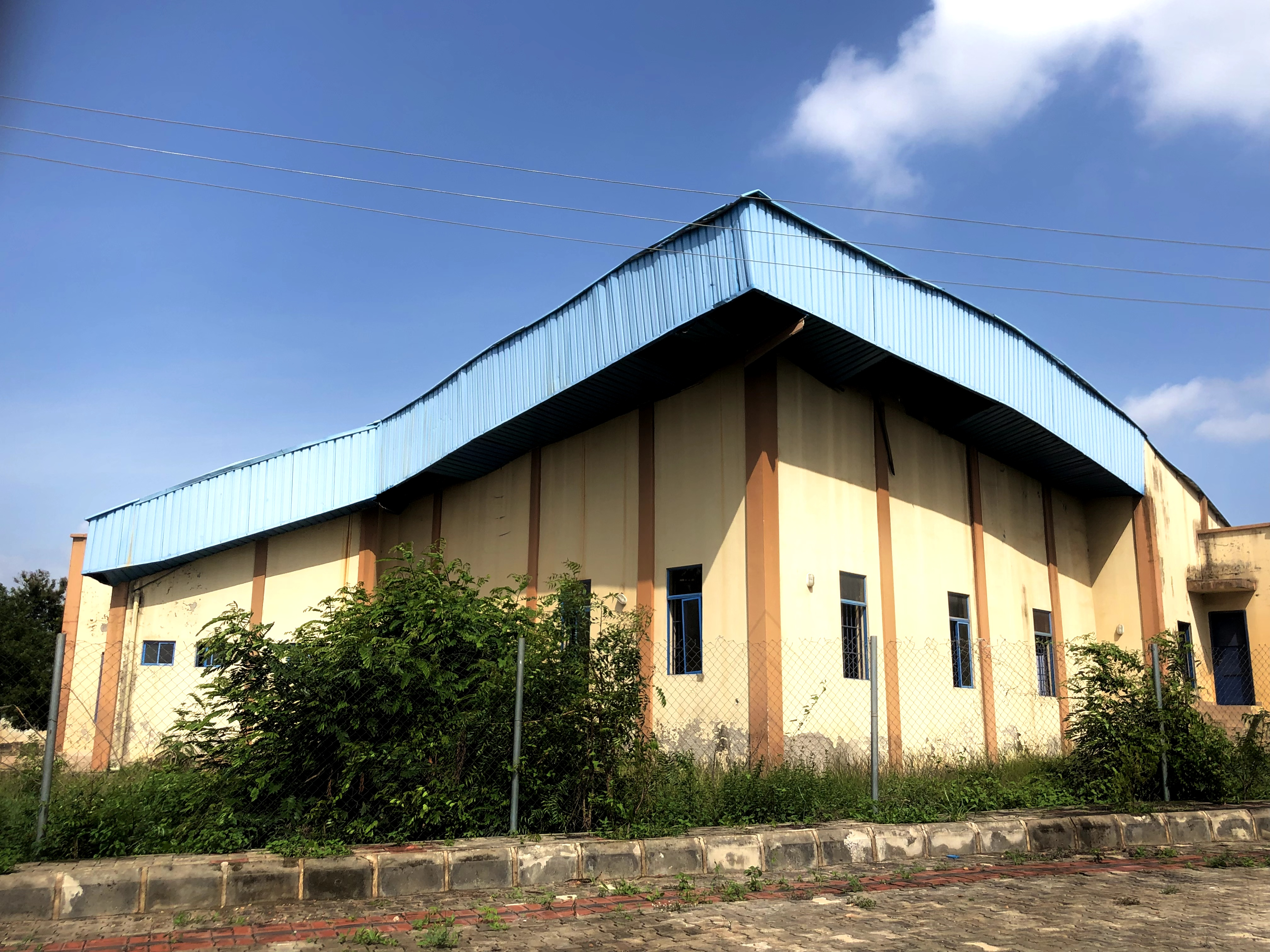
Auditorium Hall

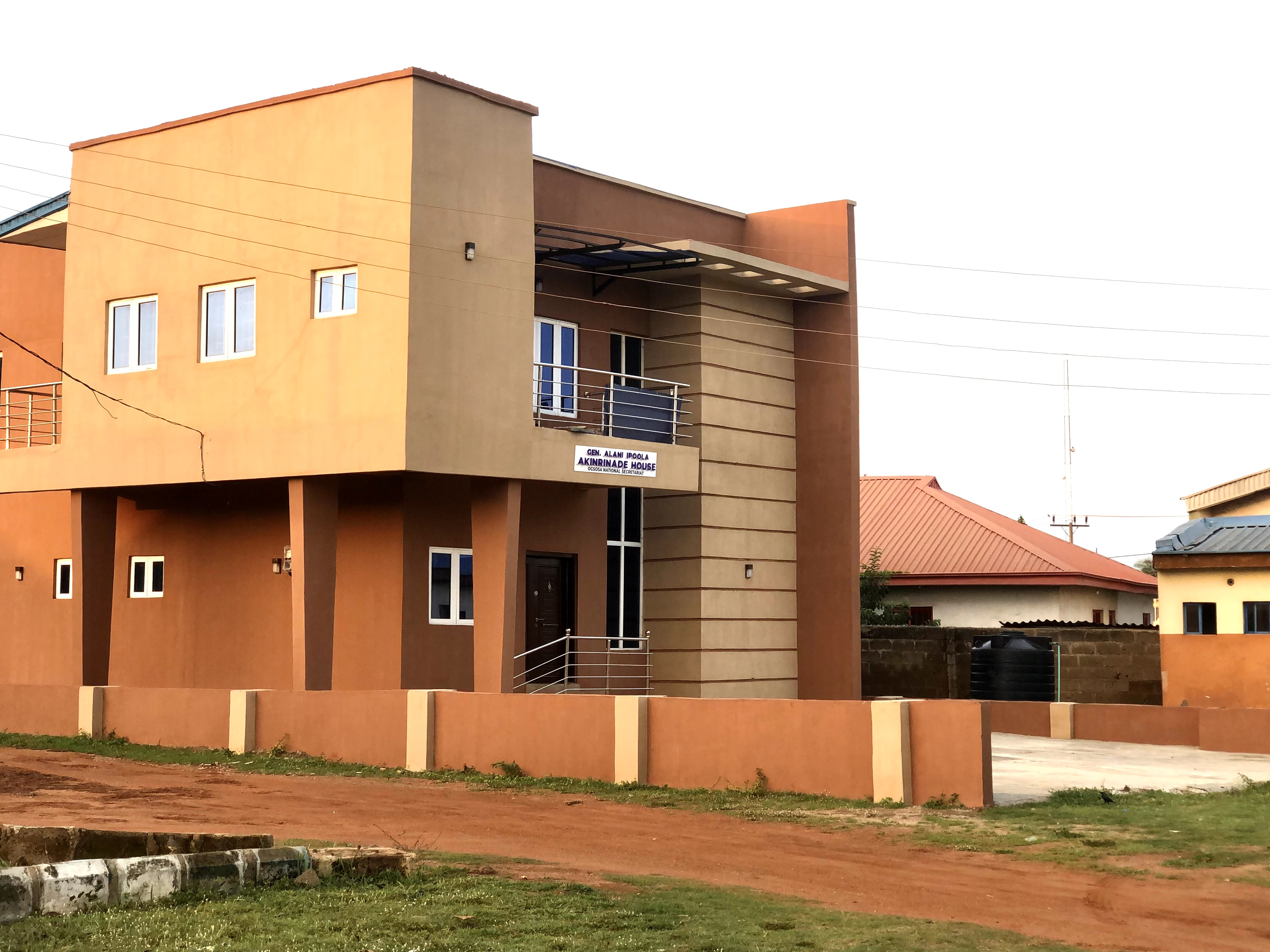
Offa Grammar School Old Students Secretariat

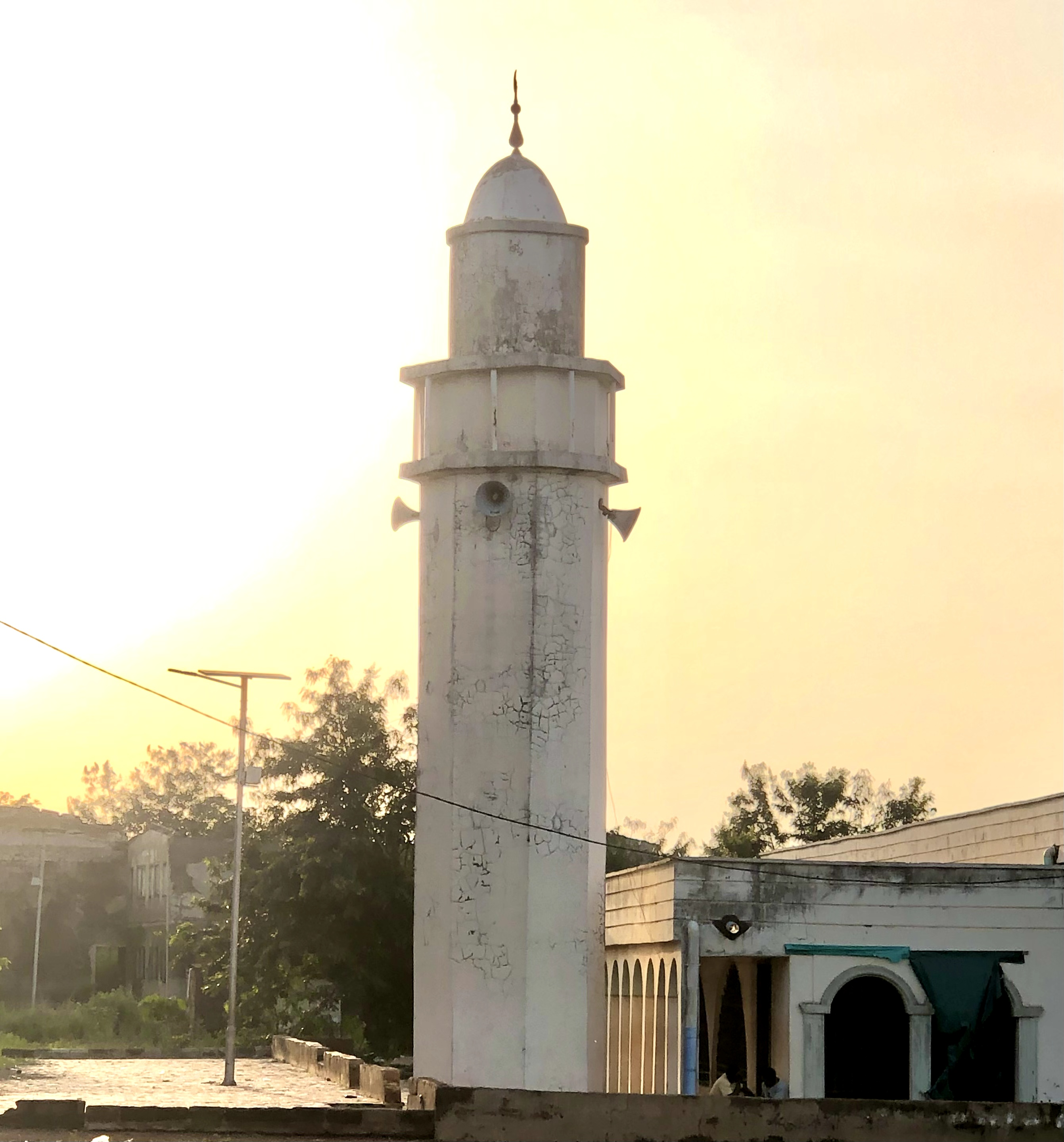
Offa Grammar Central Mosque

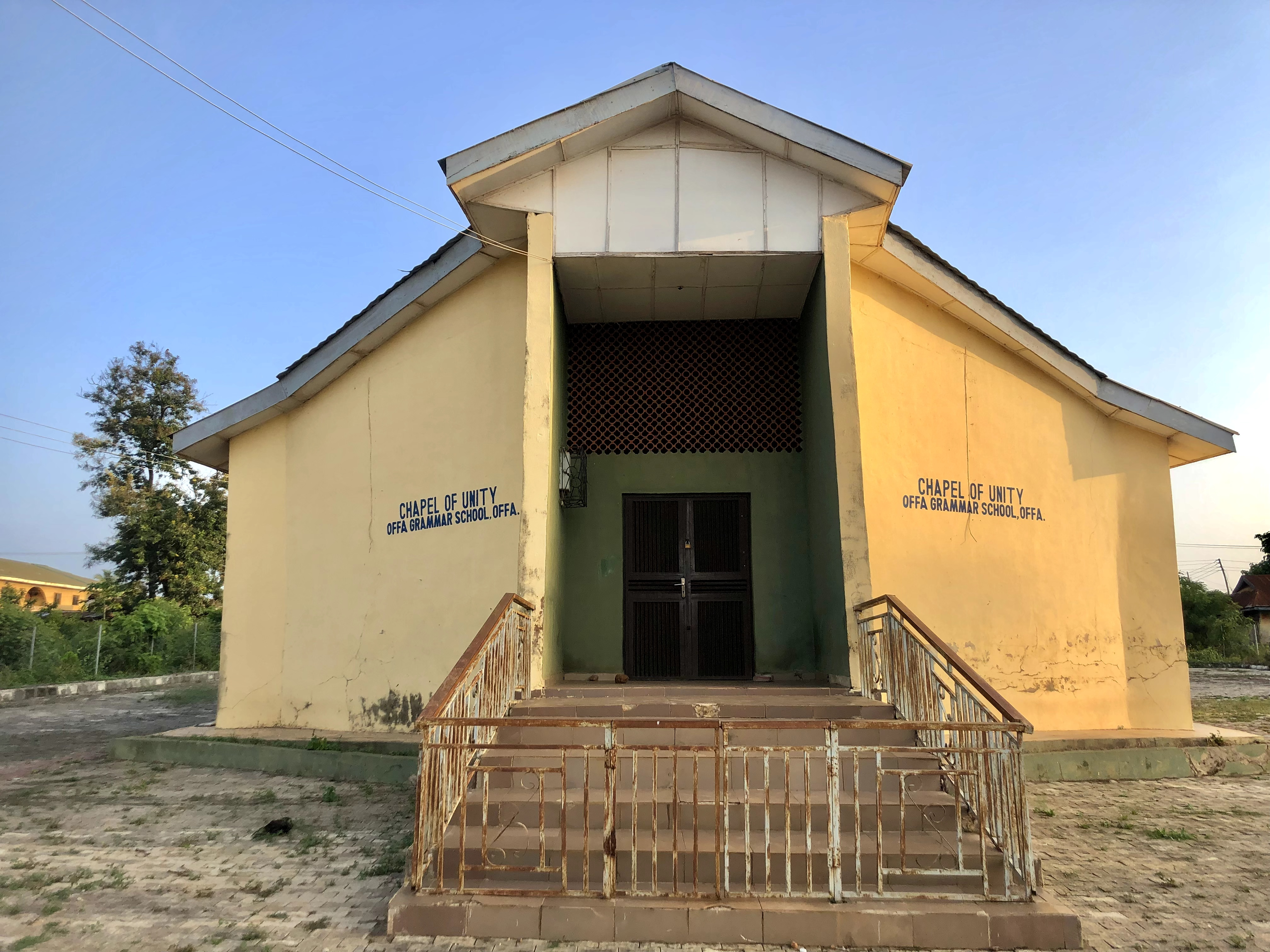
Offa Grammar School Chappel

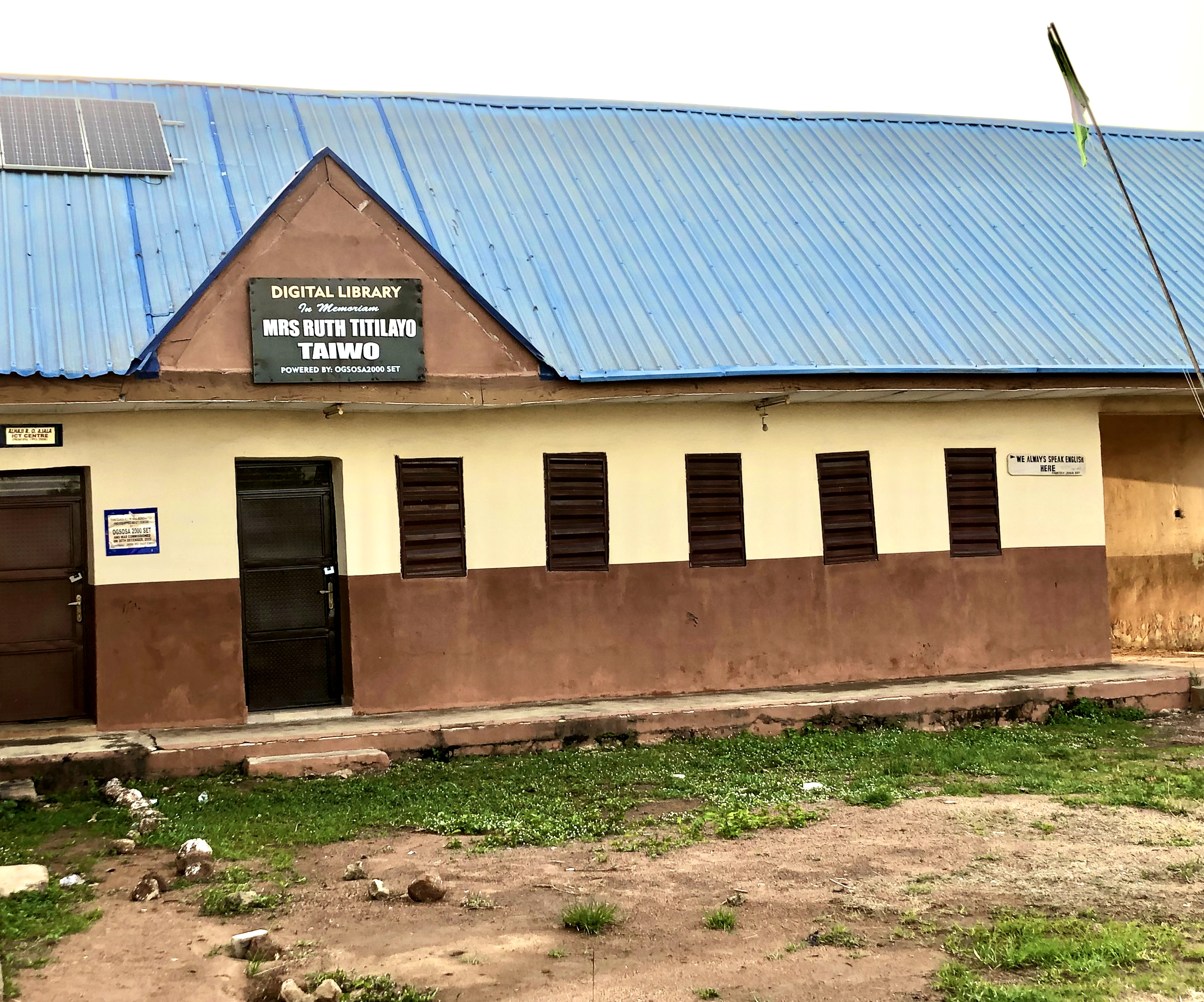
Offa Grammar School Digital Library
