= Roslyn Walker (curator) =

American museum curator

Roslyn Adele Walker is an American museum curator and expert in Nigerian art. Walker was director of the National Museum of African Art from 1997 to 2002, part of the Smithsonian Institution in Washington, D.C.

== Background ==
Walker was raised in Memphis, Tennessee, studied at Hampton University and did graduate work at Indiana University Bloomington. She worked at the University Museums of Illinois State University.

In 1997, she was appointed to the job of director at the Museum of African Art. Walker stated of her intentions: "We have broadened our scope. We could certainly be a stronger presence in the wider world. So visibility and service are going to need some work. We always want to improve. We aspire to perfection. Our education programs are very good -- more people need to know about them, to let the wider public know what we are doing."

During her tenure, the Museum showed an exhibition of art works from the Nigerian town of Oshogbo, including work by Adebisi Akanji, which had been commissioned in 1966 and donated to the Museum of African Art in 1994 by the collector and philanthropist, Waldemar A. Nielsen.

Walker retired in 2002, citing health concerns.
