= Belgore =

Belgore is a surname. Notable people with the surname include:

- Salihu Modibbo Alfa Belgore
- Dele Belgore
