= Adebisi =

Adébísí audio is both a surname and a given name of Yoruba origin, meaning "the crown or royalty has produced more, or has given birth to more".

== Notable people bearing the Name ==
Adebisi
- Gender: Female
- Language: Yoruba

Origin
- Origin: Nigeria
- Region of origin: Southwestern Nigeria

- Ade Adebisi (born 1986), Nigerian-born rugby league player
- Mola Adebisi (born 1973), German television presenter and actor
- Adebisi Akande, Nigerian politician
- Adebisi Akanji (born 1930s), Nigerian artist

Fictional characters:

- Simon Adebisi, character in the television series Oz
