= Ibrahim Umar (physicist) =

Nigerian scientist

Ibrahim Khalil Umar
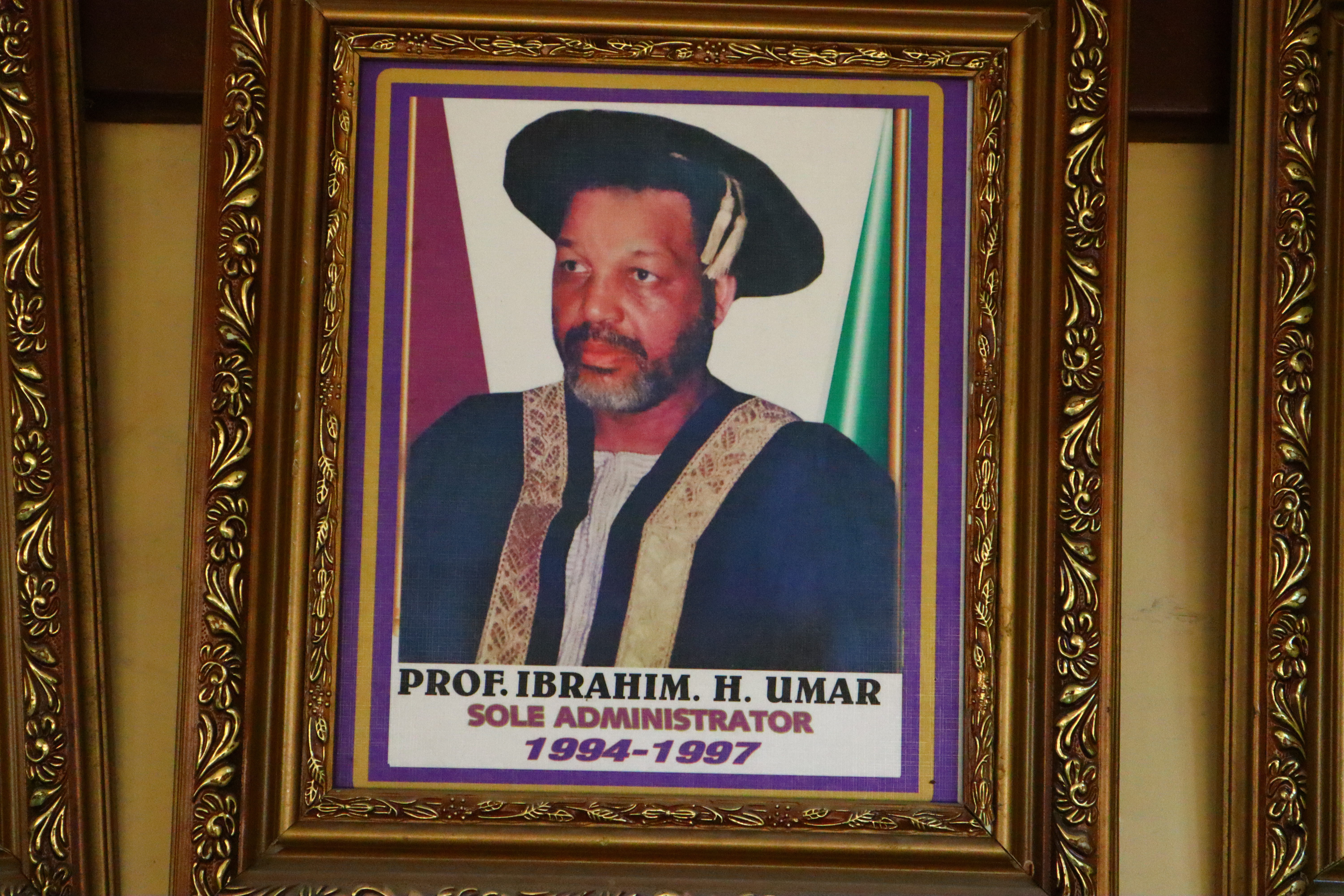
- Died: January 2023
- Citizenship: Nigerian
- Occupation: Academic

Ibrahim Khalil Umar (died 2023) was a Nigerian scientist and university administrator. He was vice-chancellor of Bayero University, Kano, Nigeria from 1979 to 1986. He held a B.Sc. in physics and mathematics from Ahmadu Bello University in Zaria, Nigeria, a M.Sc. in physics from Northern Illinois University, USA and a Ph.D. (1974) in physics at the University of East Anglia, United Kingdom. In 1976, he became the first Nigerian academic in physics to teach at Bayero University. In 1978, he served on the national constitutional assembly that drafted the Constitution of the 2nd Republic.

Between 1994 and 1997, Umar served as sole administrator of the Federal University of Technology, Minna.

He represented Nigeria at the Executive Assembly of the World Energy Council from 1990. He was a member of the Nigerian delegation to the International Atomic Energy Agency (IAEA) General Conference from 1989, and was appointed director-general of the Energy Commission of Nigeria in 1989. He served as chairman of the Board of Governors of the International Atomic Energy Agency from 2000 to 2001. In 2004, he was the director of the Centre for Energy Research and Training, where the first Nigerian research nuclear reactor is located.

In 2007, Umar was on the international advisory committee for the international workshop on Renewable Energy for Sustainable Development in Africa, held at the University of Nigeria, Nsukka in Nigeria.

== Death ==
On 30 January 2023, his son Faruk Ibrahim Umar announced his death.
