= Muhammed S. Audu =

Nigerian academic

Prof Muhammed S. Audu

6th vice-chancellor Federal University of Technology, Minna
- In office 2007–2012
- President: Umaru Musa Yar'Adua
- Vice President: Goodluck Jonathan
- Preceded by: Hamman Sa'ad
- Succeeded by: Musibau Adewunmi Akanji

Deputy Vice-Chancellor Federal University Lokoja
- Incumbent
- Assumed office 2020 — present

Personal details
- Born: Muhammed Salihu Audu Kogi State, Nigeria

Muhammed Salihu Audu better known as Muhammed S. Audu is a Nigerian academic. He served as the sixth vice-chancellor of Federal University of Technology, Minna from 2007 to 2012. He is currently the deputy vice-chancellor of Federal University, Lokoja.

== Biography ==
Mohammed Salihu Audu was born to Sule and Salamatu Atta Audu, who are of Ebira origin. He started his elementary education at RCM Catholic Primary School, Okene and St. William Primary School, Ilorin. He proceeded to attend his high school at Community Secondary School, Okene and Ansarul Islam Secondary School, Ilorin. He graduated from Usman Danfodio University, Sokoto, where he obtained his BA in history, and then proceeded to obtain his MA degree in international relations from Bayero University, Kano and then his PhD from Benue State University, Makurdi.

== Work ==
Mohammed Audu have worked as a teacher, researcher and is an active community development participant. He is a professor of history and international studies and currently the deputy vice chancellor of the Federal University of Lokoja.

He has published several academic journals and textbooks notably War and Peace in the 20th Century and Nigerian Peoples and Cultureand is also a member of several professional bodies.
