= Jonathan O. Ndagi =

Nigerian academic and author (1929–2026)

Jonathan Ndagi Wazirin makaranta Nupe
- Óthmán Ndágí
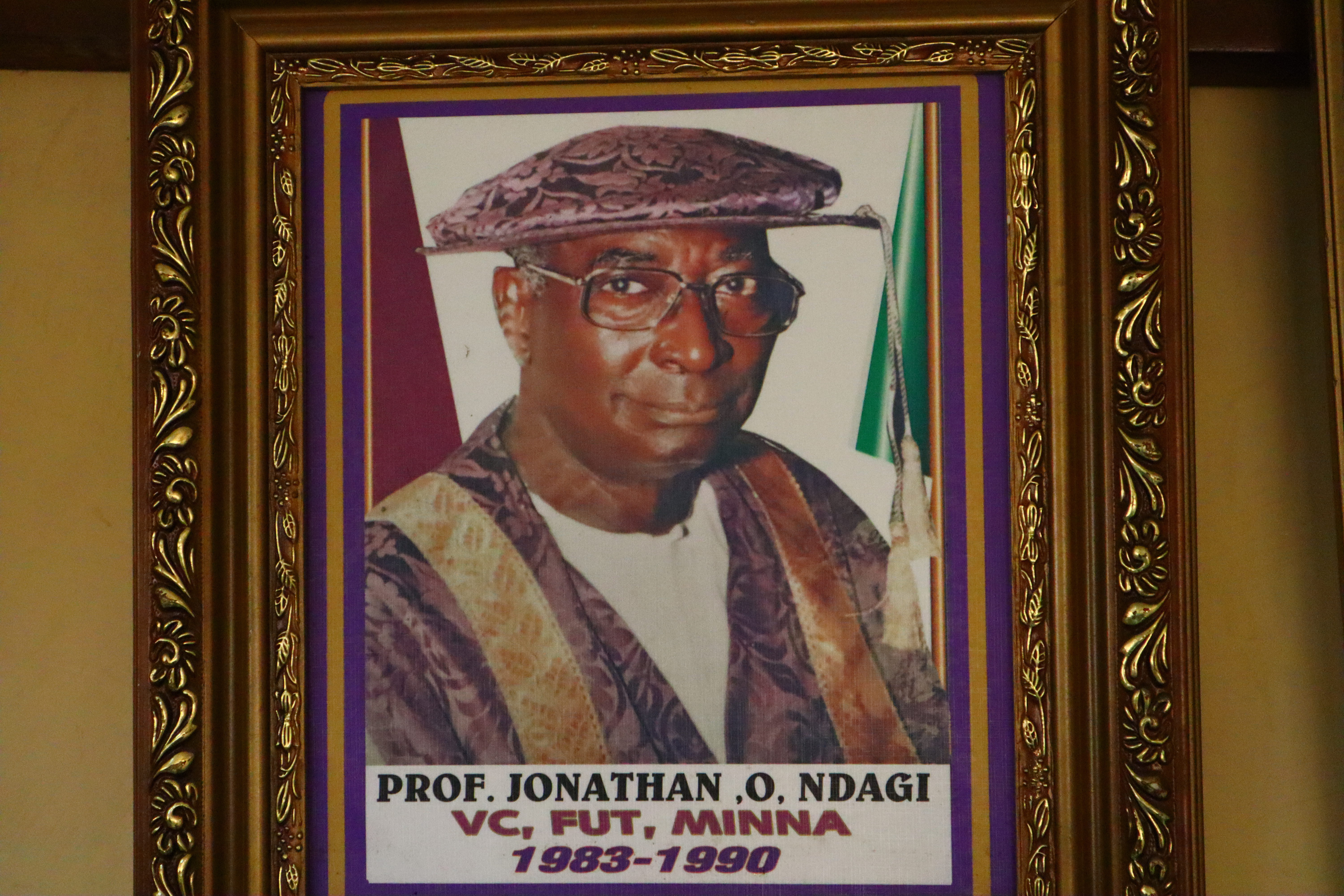
- Born: 12 November 1929; Katcha, Northern Region, Colony and Protectorate of Nigeria
- Died: October 2026 (aged 96)
- Education: University of Wisconsin, University of Ibadan
- Occupations: Academics, author and researcher
- Title: Pioneer Vice-chancellor of Federal University of Technology Minna
- Term: 1980–1990

Jonathan Osman Ndagi OON OFR (12 November 1929 – October 2026) was a Nigerian scholar, statesman and educator. He also held the chieftaincy title Wazirin Makaranta Nupe.

== Background ==
Born in what is now known as Katcha, Nigeria, he started his education at Christ Church School, Gusau, in 1940 and finished in 1944. Then he attended the Nigeria College of Art, Science and Technology, Zaria, and finished in 1957. He attended University College Ibadan, now known as the University of Ibadan, from 1959 to 1963, and he gained his MS in educative administration at the University of Wisconsin in 1969. He started his career as a teacher in Teachers College Minna and Niger Middle Bida, later in 1969 he joined Government College Bida.

Ndagi was appointed the vice chancellor of the Federal University of Technology, Minna, being the first holder of the position when the institution was established in 1983; he left the position in 1990 after serving for seven years. At the time he left the office of vice chancellor, 42 students were expelled from the school. Professor Jonathan Ndagi was the vice chancellor of the institution from 1983 to 1990.

He was also a prolific writer.

Ndagi was married to Comfort Yiye and they had one son and four daughters. He died in October 2026, at the age of 96.

== Publications ==
- The Essentials of Research Methodology for Nigerian Educators, Foundation of Education series, University Press Limited, 1984. ISBN 9781547014, ISBN 9789781547010.
- Church and civil society: Anglican Church and education in Nigeria. Jonathan Osman Ndagi, 2002. OCLC 741197
- The application of mathematical models to educational planning in northwestern Nigeria. Jonathan Osman Ndagi, ©1975. Dissertation: Ph. D. University of Wisconsin—Madison 1975, OCLC 45284272
- Conference papers and proceedings Congresses. Conference publication, J A Abalaka, J M Baba, Jonathan Osman Ndagi. Committee of Vice Chancellors Nigeria Seminars. OCLC 32655579. Notes: "The proceedings of the twelfth annual seminar, Committee of Vice -Chancellors of Nigerian Universities held at the Federal University of Technology, Minna, Niger State, 2nd & 3rd March 1989"—Cover. Contents: Nigerian university graduate and employment prospects: past, present and future/Isa B Mohammed (11 p.). -- The place for the Nigerian university graduates in the labour market/Chidi Offong (7 p.).-- Reviewing and restructuring of academic programmes as a means to economic recovery/Idris A Abdulkadir (9 p.). -- Science and technology curricula of Nigerian universities and their relevance to the manufacturing sector/Abu Gidado (5 p.). -- Government and the university brain drain problem/Adamu Nayaya Mohammed (10 p.). -- Managing the problem of brain drain under the structural adjustment programme/James O Ogunlade (5 p.). -- The brain drain and the national health scheme/Adeoye Adeniyi (10 p.). -- The brain drain and its implications on the national policy on education/Mahdi Adamu (7 p.). -- Developing indigenous technology in Nigeria : what place for the technology universities?/G.E.O Ogum (8 p.). -- Nigerian university education and the improvement of indigenous technology : problems and prospects/T.I Obiaga (10 p.). edited by J.A. Abalaka, J.M. Baba, J.O. Ndagi.
