= Nazmat Surajudeen Bakinde =

Nigerian academic

Nazmat Surajudeen-Bakinde
- Born: November 12, 1974 (age 52); Offa, Nigeria
- Citizenship: Nigerian
- Education: University of Ilorin; University of Liverpool
- Occupations: Academic; Author; engineer
- Office: Vice Chancellor of University of Applied Science, Engineering and Technology (USET) Gambia

Professor Nazmat Surajudeen Bakinde (born 12th November 1974) is a Nigerian Professor of Electrical/Electronics Engineering from the University of Ilorin, Nigeria. She is currently the Vice Chancellor of the University of Applied Science, Engineering and Technology (USET) Gambia.

== Early life and education ==
Nazmat Surajudeen-Bakinde is a native of Offa, from Ajilo Compound Offa, Kwara State, Nigeria. She studied at Offa Grammar School and was head girl for two years. She earned her bachelor's degree in Engineering in 1997 and her master's degree in Engineering in 2004 from the University of Ilorin. In 2010, she received her PhD in Engineering and Electronics from the University of Liverpool, United Kingdom. She is a specialist in telecommunications and in wireless communications.

== Career ==
Bakinde previously served at the University of Ilorin as an Assistant Director (Administration) with the Centre for International Education and as the acting head of the Department of Electrical and Electronics Engineering, Faculty of Engineering and Technology, University of Ilorin prior to her appointment as the Vice Chancellor of University of Applied Science, Engineering and Technology (USET) Gambia in year 2024.

== Notable publications ==
1. Multimedia tools in the teaching and learning processes: A systematic review
2. Path loss predictions in the VHF and UHF bands within urban environments: Experimental investigation of empirical, heuristics and geospatial models
3. Path loss predictions for multi-transmitter radio propagation in VHF bands using Adaptive Neuro-Fuzzy Inference System
4. Adaptive Neuro-Fuzzy model for path loss prediction in the VHF band
5. ICT enabled Almajiri education in Nigeria: Challenges and prospects
6. Dynamic Mode Decomposition-Based Features for Ovarian Cancer Gene Expression Classification Using Machine Learning
