= Faruk Adamu Kuta =

Nigerian academic

- Born: 26 October 1973 (age 52); Kuta, Shiroro
- Occupation: Academic

Faruk Adamu Kuta is a Nigerian academic who is currently a vice chancellor of Federal University of Technology Minna (FUTMinna).

== Education ==
Kuta graduated from Usman Danfodiyo University, Sokoto from department of Microbiology, he continued with MTech. in Pharmaceutical Microbiology at the same university. He then completed his PhD in Medical Microbiology at Abubakar Tafawa Balewa University, Bauchi, Bauchi.
