= Dele Belgore =

Nigerian lawyer

Muhammad Dele Belgore
- Born: 25 June 1961 (age 65); Ilorin, Kwara State, Nigeria
- Education: University of Hull; University of Bristol; Nigerian Law School
- Occupations: Lawyer, arbitrator, politician
- Known for: Senior Advocate of Nigeria (SAN); arbitration and Alternative Dispute Resolution

Muhammad Dele Belgore, SAN (born 25 June 1961) is a Nigerian lawyer, arbitrator, and politician, renowned for his pioneering role in the development of Alternative Dispute Resolution (ADR) in Nigeria. He is a Senior Advocate of Nigeria (SAN) and Fellow of the Chartered Institute of Arbitrators (UK), where he also served as Chairman of the Nigeria Branch. Over the course of his career, Belgore has acted as counsel and arbitrator in numerous domestic and international arbitration cases and contributed significantly to the establishment of ADR frameworks such as the Lagos Multi-Door Courthouse. Born into a distinguished legal family, Belgore is the son of the late Hon. Justice Mahmud Babatunde Belgore, former Chief Judge of the Federal High Court.He was educated in Nigeria and the United Kingdom, obtaining his LLB from the University of Hull and an LLM from the University of Bristol before being called to the Nigerian Bar in 1985. Beyond his legal practice, he has been active in Kwara State politics, where he has sought to promote governance reforms and economic development. Belgore is married and has children.

== Early life and education ==
Muhammad Dele Belgore was born on 25 June 1961 into a prominent legal family in Ilorin, Kwara State, Nigeria. His father, the late Hon. Justice Mahmud Babatunde Belgore, served as Chief Judge of the Federal High Court of Nigeria and was widely respected for his contributions to the development of the Nigerian judiciary. Belgore began his early education at Capital School, Kaduna, and later attended Offa Grammar School in Kwara State. He completed his secondary education at Shoreham Grammar School in Sussex, England, where he obtained his General Certificate of Education (GCE). He proceeded to the University of Hull, United Kingdom, where he earned a Bachelor of Laws (LL.B Hons) degree in 1983. He later obtained a Master of Laws (LL.M) from the University of Bristol in 1984, specializing in commercial and maritime law. Upon returning to Nigeria, Belgore attended the Nigerian Law School in Lagos and was called to the Nigerian Bar in 1985.

== Career ==
After being called to the Nigerian Bar in 1985, Muhammad Dele Belgore began his legal career as a Legal Officer at Nigerian Merchant Bank Limited, where he worked between 1985 and 1986. He later joined the chambers of Chief Rotimi Williams, SAN, one of Nigeria’s foremost legal practitioners, where he gained significant litigation and commercial law experience from 1986 to 1989. In 1989, Belgore co-founded the law firm Sofunde, Osakwe, Ogundipe & Belgore (SOOB), which has since become one of Nigeria’s leading commercial and arbitration law firms. He remains a partner in the firm, focusing on dispute resolution, arbitration, and regulatory compliance. Belgore was conferred the prestigious rank of Senior Advocate of Nigeria (SAN) in 2001 at the age of 40, making him one of the youngest lawyers in the country to receive the honor. His elevation was in recognition of his distinguished contributions to legal practice, pioneering work in arbitration and Alternative Dispute Resolution (ADR), and leadership within the Nigerian legal community. A Fellow and Chartered Arbitrator of the Chartered Institute of Arbitrators (UK), Belgore has served as Chairman of the Nigeria Branch of the Institute. He has acted as arbitrator and counsel in more than 50 domestic and international arbitration proceedings under leading arbitral institutions, including the International Chamber of Commerce (ICC), London Maritime Arbitrators Association (LMAA), and the London Court of International Arbitration (LCIA). He is also an accredited mediator with the Centre for Effective Dispute Resolution (CEDR) and has contributed to the institutionalization of ADR in Nigeria through his involvement in initiatives such as the Lagos Multi-Door Courthouse, the country’s first court-connected ADR center.

== Political career ==
Belgore first entered elective politics in the 2011 gubernatorial election in Kwara State as the candidate of the Action Congress of Nigeria (ACN). He ran on a platform that emphasised free education, strengthening village schools, youth employment, revival of the scholarship system, and closer local-government accountability. In that election, he was defeated by the incumbent party candidate Abdulfatah Ahmed of the People’s Democratic Party (PDP), who polled 254,969 votes to Belgore’s 152,580. After the tribunal upheld Ahmed’s election on 11 November 2011, Belgore’s petition failed to overturn the result. In 2013–2014, Belgore formally defected from the ACN (which had merged into the All Progressives Congress, APC) to the PDP. He argued that the APC in Kwara had ceded party structures to interests that undermined internal democracy and grassroots change. As a PDP member, he served as campaign coordinator for the party’s operations in Kwara during the 2015 general elections, and positioned himself as a policy-development specialist focusing on social justice and state development. Ahead of the 2019 election cycle, Belgore returned to the APC and signalled his intention to contest the governorship race under that banner, citing the need to reposition Kwara as a “first generation state” in terms of development. On 6 October 2018 he withdrew his candidacy in the APC primary and threw his support behind Abdulrahman AbdulRazaq, declaring his step-down was in the interest of party unity and the advancement of the state. Throughout his political journey, Belgore has been described as a grassroots organiser and policy-development specialist, committed to social equity, education reform, youth empowerment and intra-party democracy, emphasising social justice, economic opportunity and the transformation of Kwara State’s governance architecture.

== Philanthropy and awards ==
Belgore’s philanthropic activities focus on community development, youth mentorship and advocacy for social justice, particularly in his home town of Ilorin and throughout Kwara State. He has supported charitable initiatives aimed at improving the welfare of disadvantaged groups, including providing educational and moral support to younger generations in the legal and political spheres. He is also widely recognised for his personal commitment to integrity and justice, serving as a role-model and mentor to emerging lawyers and community leaders.
