= Federal University of Technology, Minna =

Public university in Minna, Nigeria

Federal University of Technology Minna, Niger state
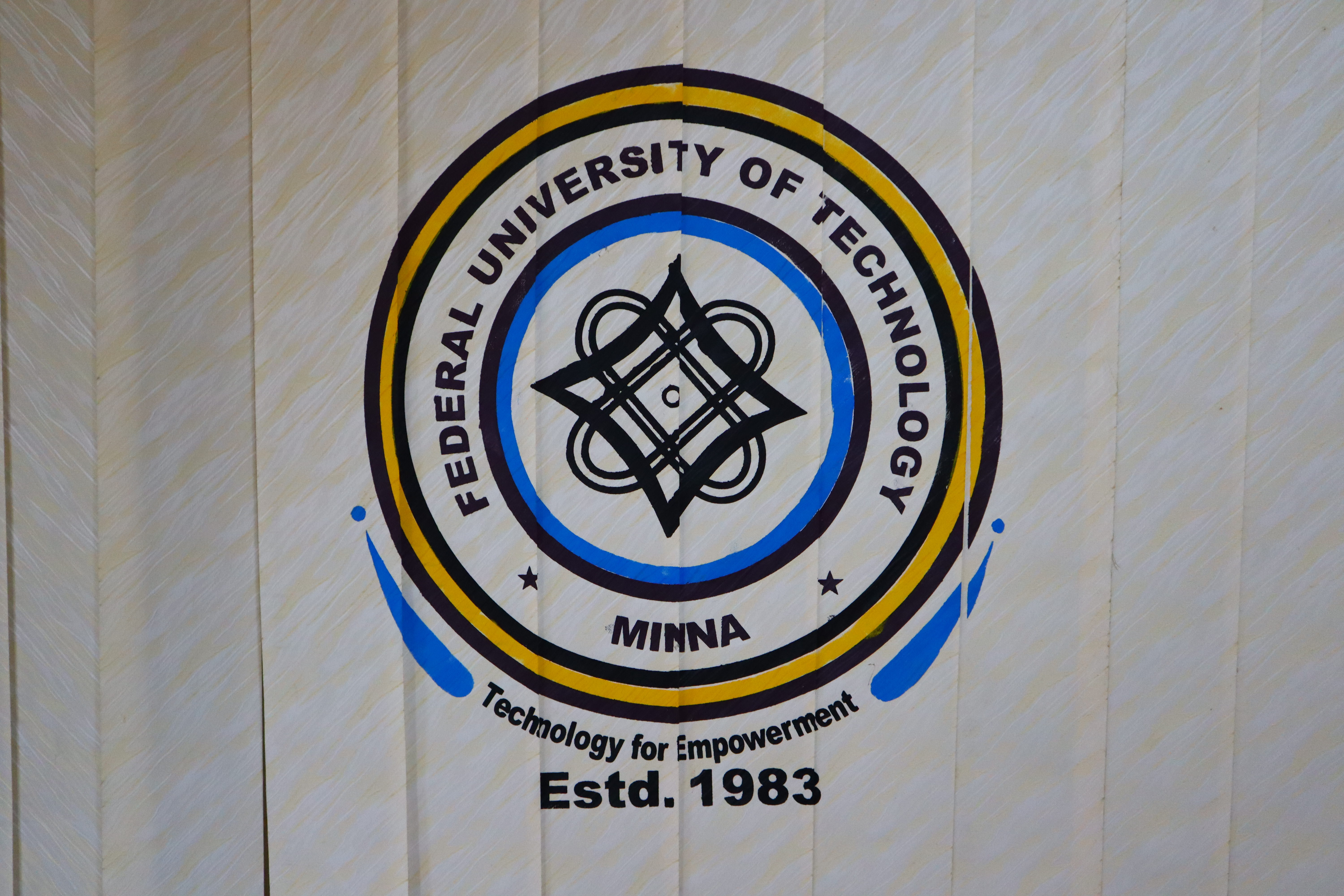
- Other name: FUTMx
- Motto: Technology for Empowerment
- Type: Public
- Established: 1983; 43 years ago
- Chancellor: HRM Oba Aladetoyinbo Ogunlade Aladelusi
- Vice-Chancellor: Faruk Adamu Kuta
- Undergraduates: 25,000+
- Postgraduates: 2000+
- Location: Bosso Minna, Niger State, Nigeria; 9.5836°N 6.5463°E
- Campus: Main (Gidan Kwano) and Mini (Bosso) Campuses
- Colours: Purple
- Website: www.futminna.edu.ng
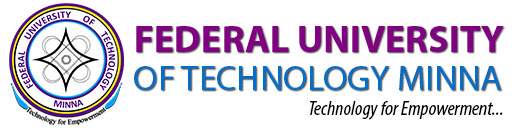

Federal University of Technology Minna (FUTMinna) is a Nigerian federal government-owned university located in Minna, Nigeria.

FUT Minna specialises in technological education and offers bachelor's and master's degrees in various technology-related fields. The University is a designated Centre of Excellence in Biotechnology and Genetic Engineering and has a core competence in the development of vaccines and drugs, and also small arms design in partnership with the Armed Forces of Nigeria.

FUT Minna was established in 1983, and the first Vice-Chancellor was Professor J.O. Ndagi who served from 1983 to 1990. The governing bodies are the Council and the Senate. Primarily, the University took over the facilities of the former Government Teachers' College Bosso, for use permanently. This site now serves as the Bosso Campus of the University. The main campus Gidan Kwano which is situated on 10,650 hectares of land is located along the Minna - Kataeregi - Bida Road. The Institution is listed in the Guide to Higher Education in Africa, Association of African Universities and the International Association of Universities, 1999.

== Library ==
The University Library was established in 1984 and is known as the Ibrahim Badamasi Babangida Library. The library is subscribed to many databases with over 80,000 collections of printed books, journals and other materials to enhance teaching, learning and research in the university community. The Information technology service unit has over 350 computers with internet connectivity that provide access to electronic resources. The present University Librarian is Dr. Katamba Abubakar Saka. The main library has the following units:

- Circulation Unit
- Serial unit
- Government document unit
- Thesis unit
- E-Library unit
- Digital Library
- Reprographic units

The branch library is located in Bosso Campus for supporting services such as Reference service and the library is called Auwal Ibrahim Library. All these units are grouped into three departments for effective services.

== Faculties ==
As of 2018 the university has 10 schools (faculties):

- School of Agriculture and Agriculture Technology (SAAT).
- School of Electrical Engineering and Technology.(SEET)
- School of Infrastructure, Process Engineering and Technology.
- School of Innovative Technology. Formerly, School of Entrepreneurship and Management Technology.
- School of Environmental Technology.
- School of Life Sciences.
- School of Physical Sciences (SPS).
- School of Information and Communication Technology (SICT).
- School of Science and Technology Education.
- School of Post Graduate Studies.

== Centres ==
- Centre for Preliminary and Extra Mural Studies (CPES)
- Centre of Excellence in Disaster Risk Management and Developmental Studies, operated by the National Emergency Management Agency (NEMA).
- Centre for Climate Change and Freshwater Resources, which is associated with the Federal Ministry of Environment, a node of the Global Institute for Bio Exploration (Rutgers University, NJ, USA)
- Centre for Human Settlements and Urban Development (CHSUD) associated with the UN Human Settlements programme.
- Directorate of Research and Development (DRID).
- Centre for Genetic Engineering and Biotechnology (CGEB).
- Centre for Open Distance and e-Learning (CODeL).
- West African Service Centre on Climate Change and Adapter Land Use (WASCAL).
- Africa Centre of Excellence for Mycotoxin and Food Safety

== Affiliations ==
Federal College of Education (Technical) Akoka, Lagos State, Nigeria Federal Polytechnic Offa, Kwara State, Nigeria.

== Recreation and sports ==
As part of its overall fitness program, the university includes a floodlit sports arena on both campuses, athletics cinder tracks, badminton indoor courts, basketball courts, table tennis facilities, volleyball courts, football pitches, a fitness gymnasium, extensive pedestrian walkways, a 9-hole golf course and a student recreation centre.

The student-run radio station Search FM 92.3 Campus radio started official transmission in August 2010. Unfortunately, the radio station was gutted by fire in 2013. As of now, the radio station has a new building and a fully equipped studio which was commissioned in 2014 by the Vice Chancellor.

Campus of FUT Minna

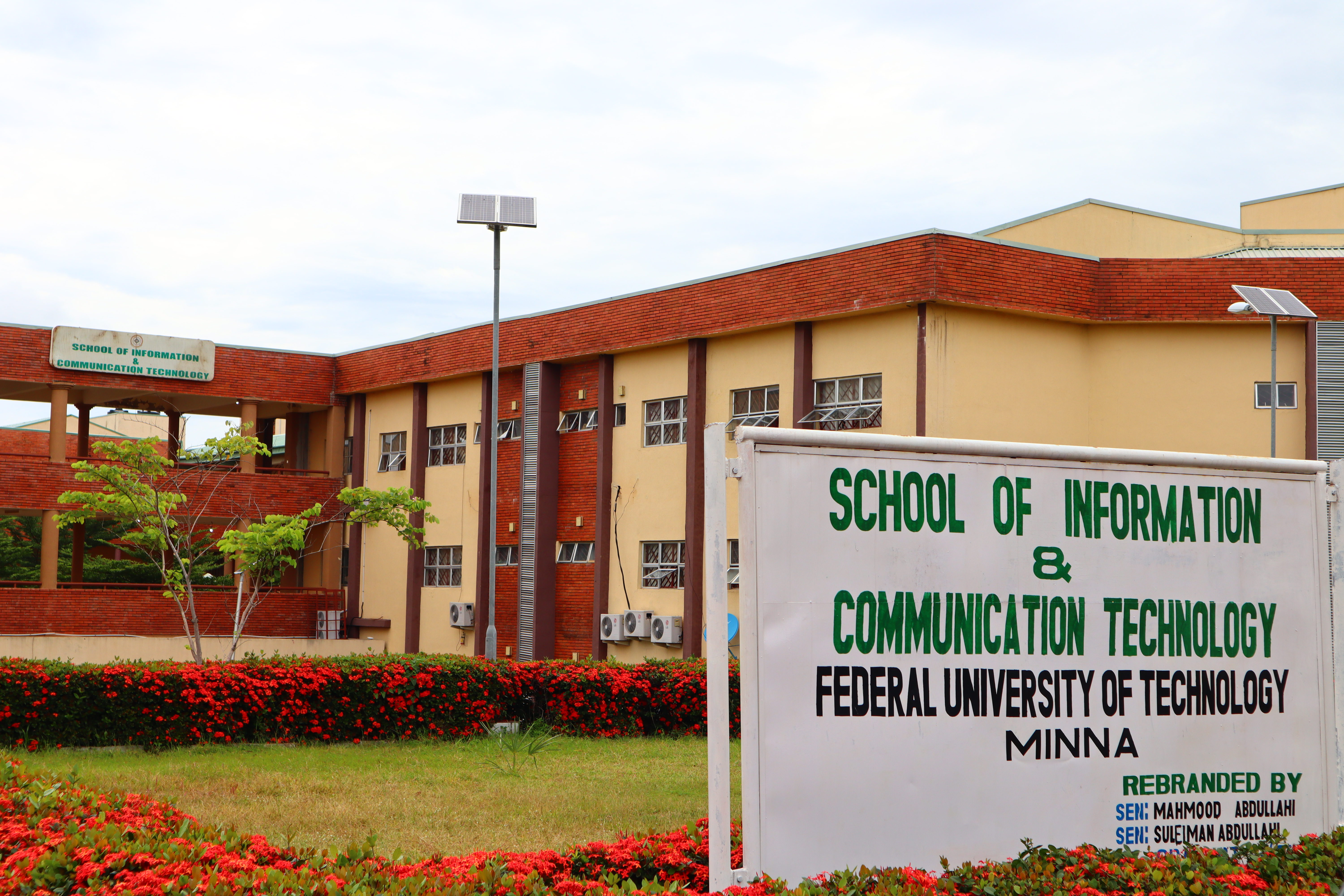
The School of Information and Communication Technology (S.I.C.T)

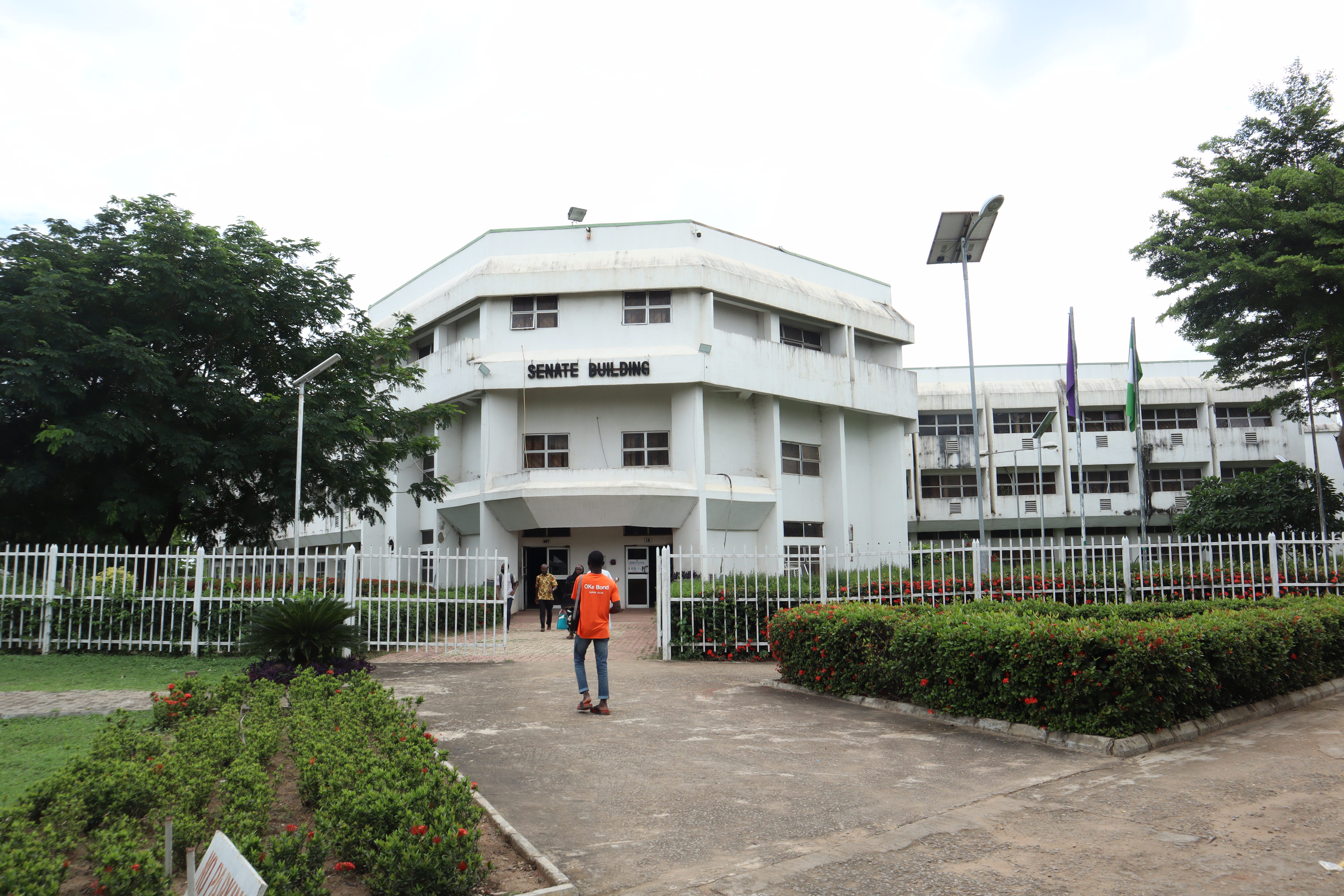
The Senate Building (main administrative hub)

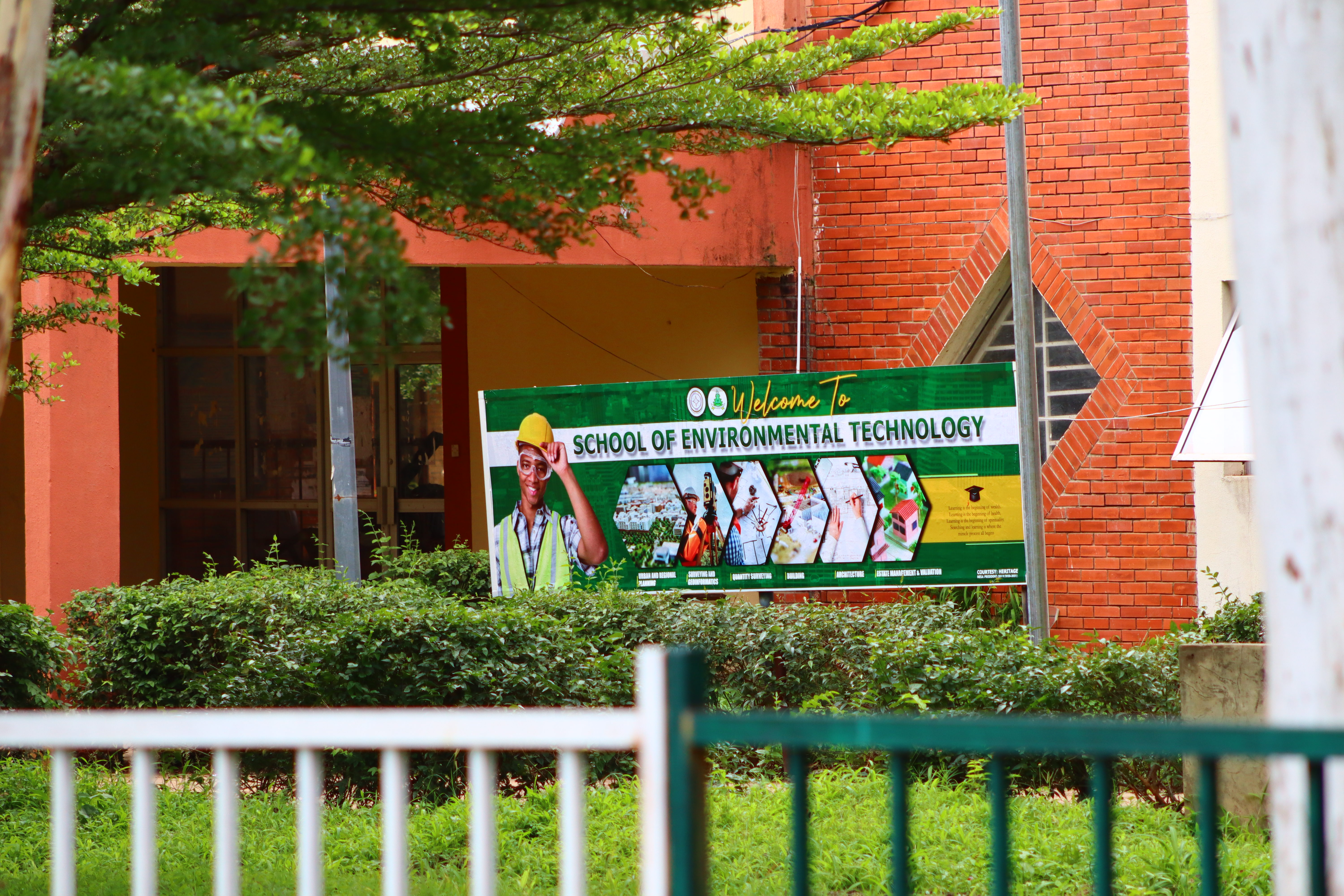
Entrance into the School of Environmental Technology building

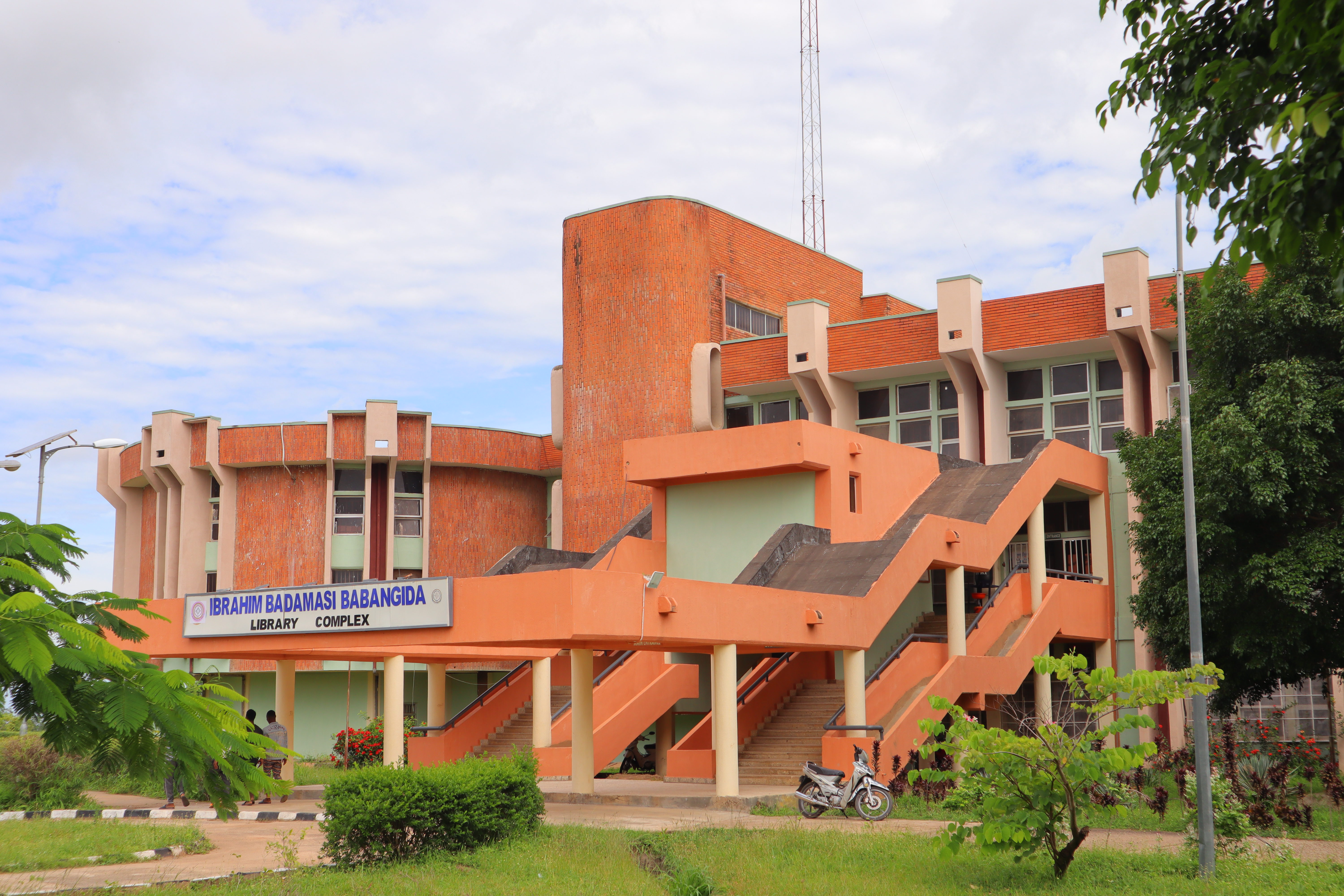
The University Library

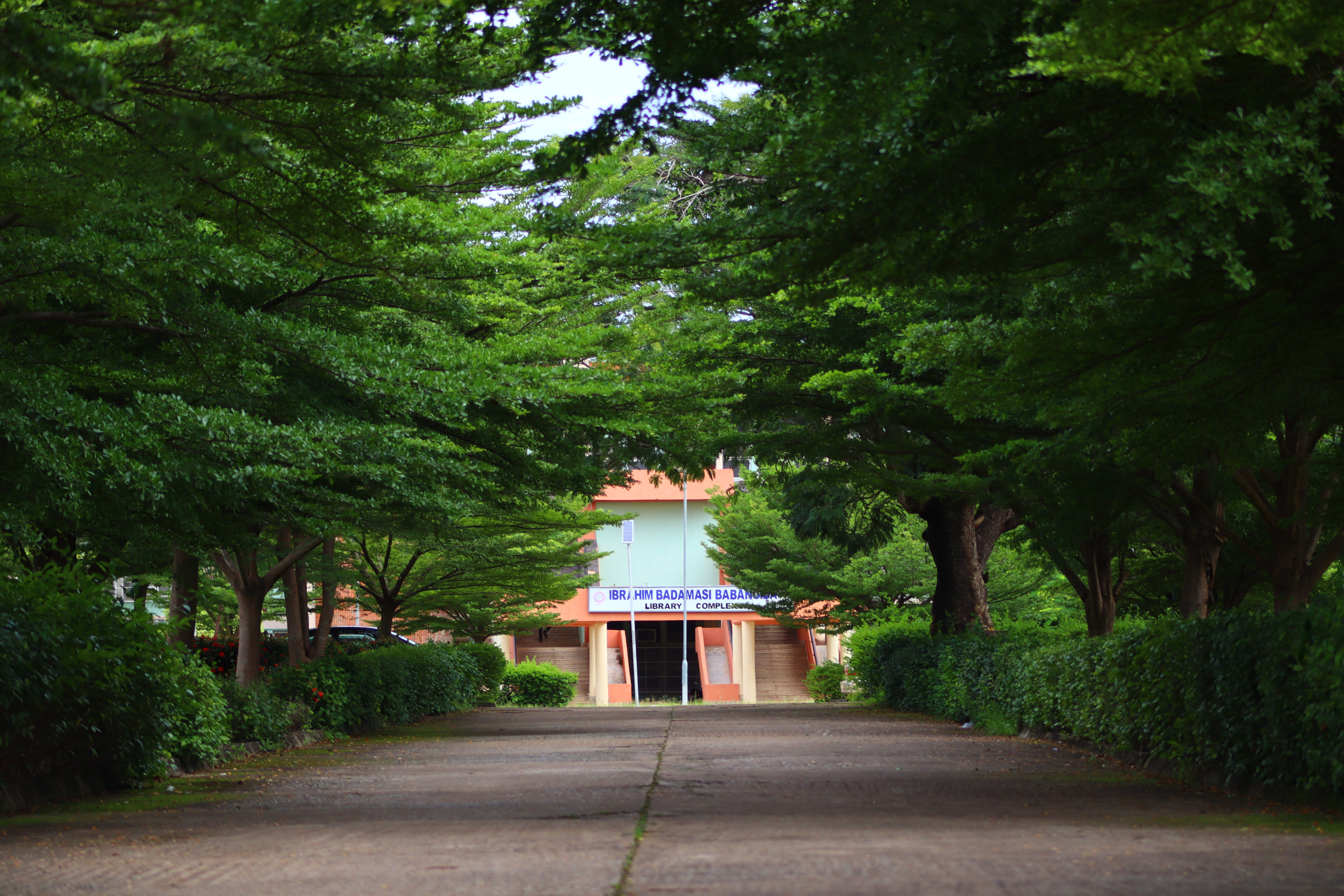
The walkway leading to the library

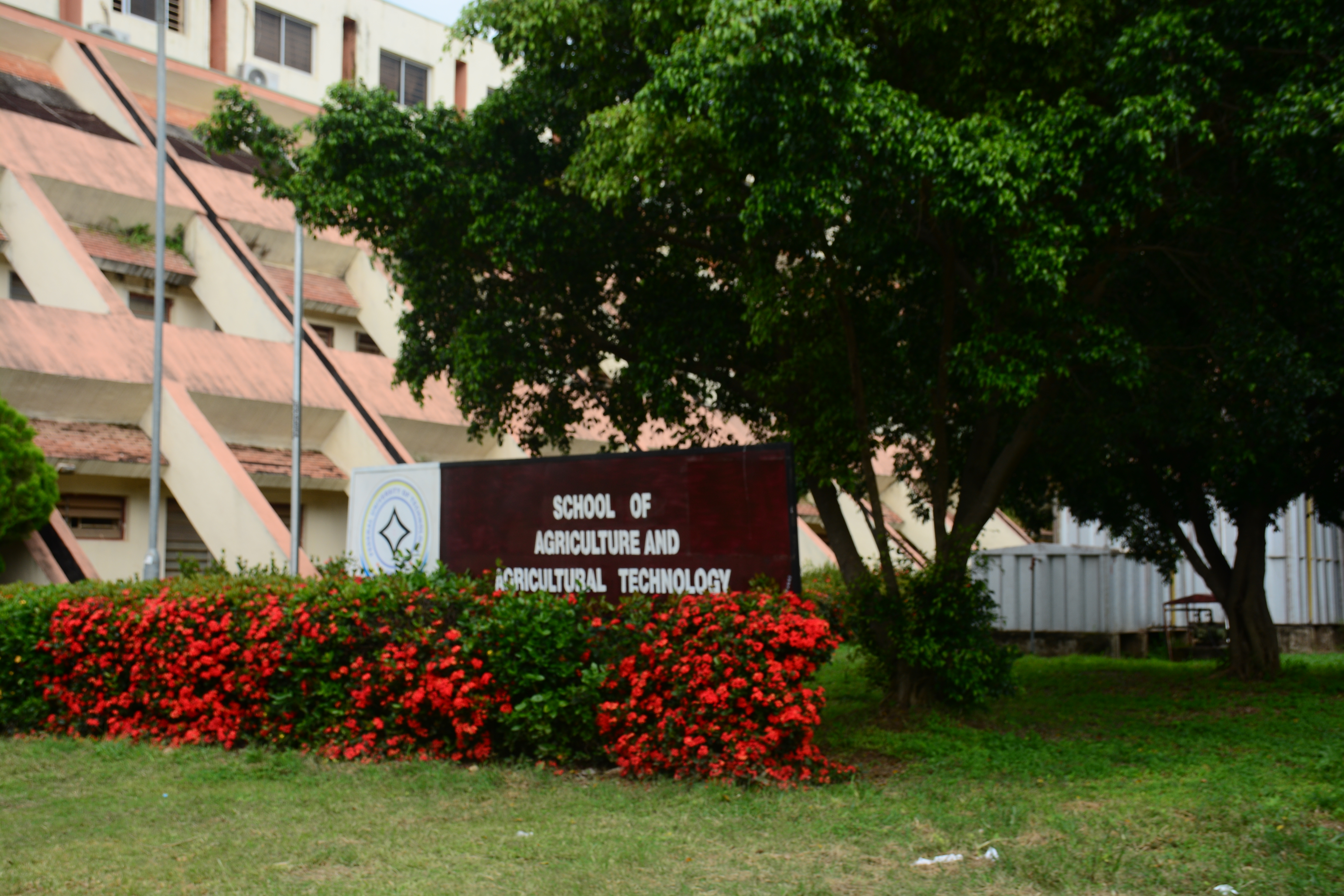
School of Agriculture and Agricultural Technology

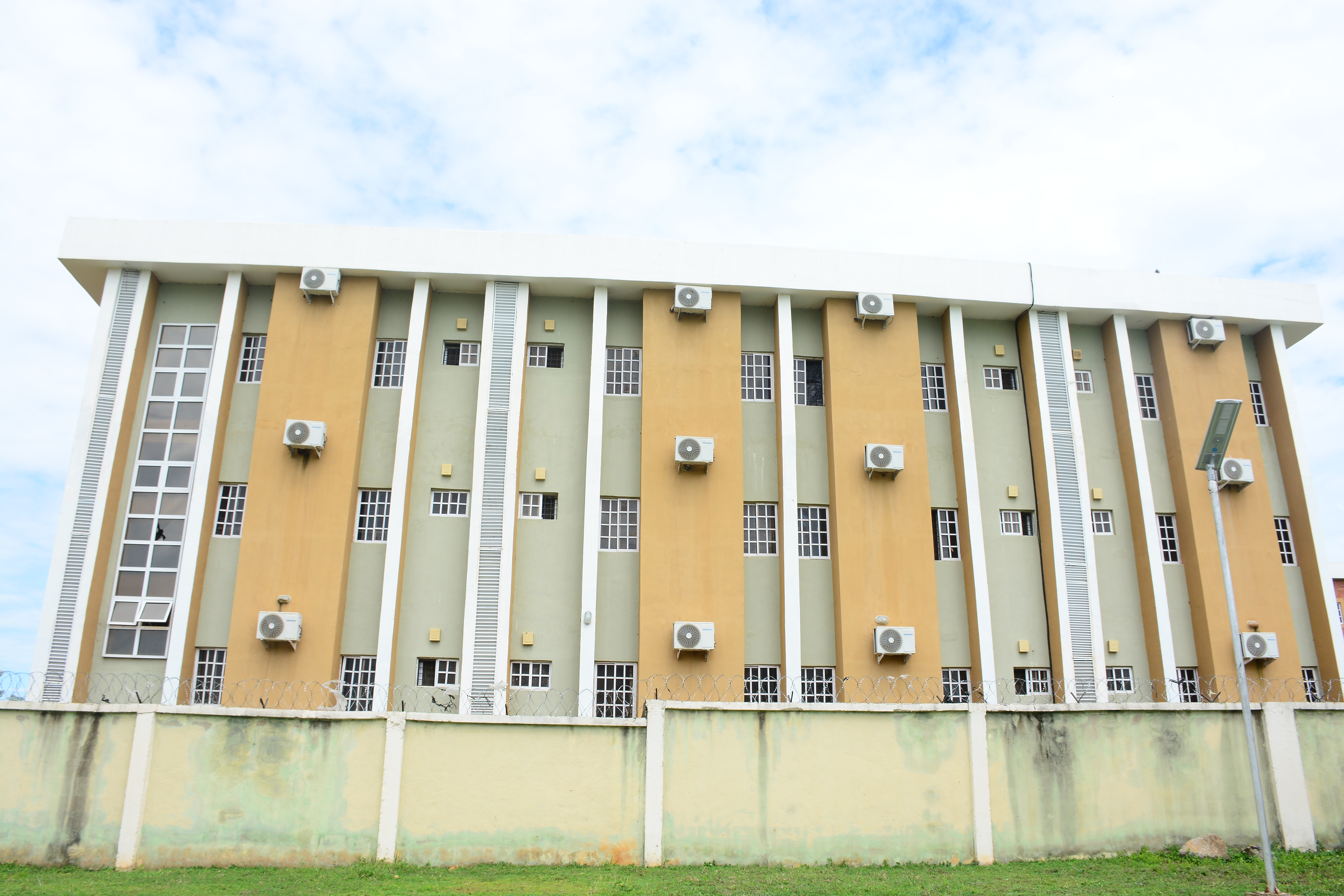
Students hostel

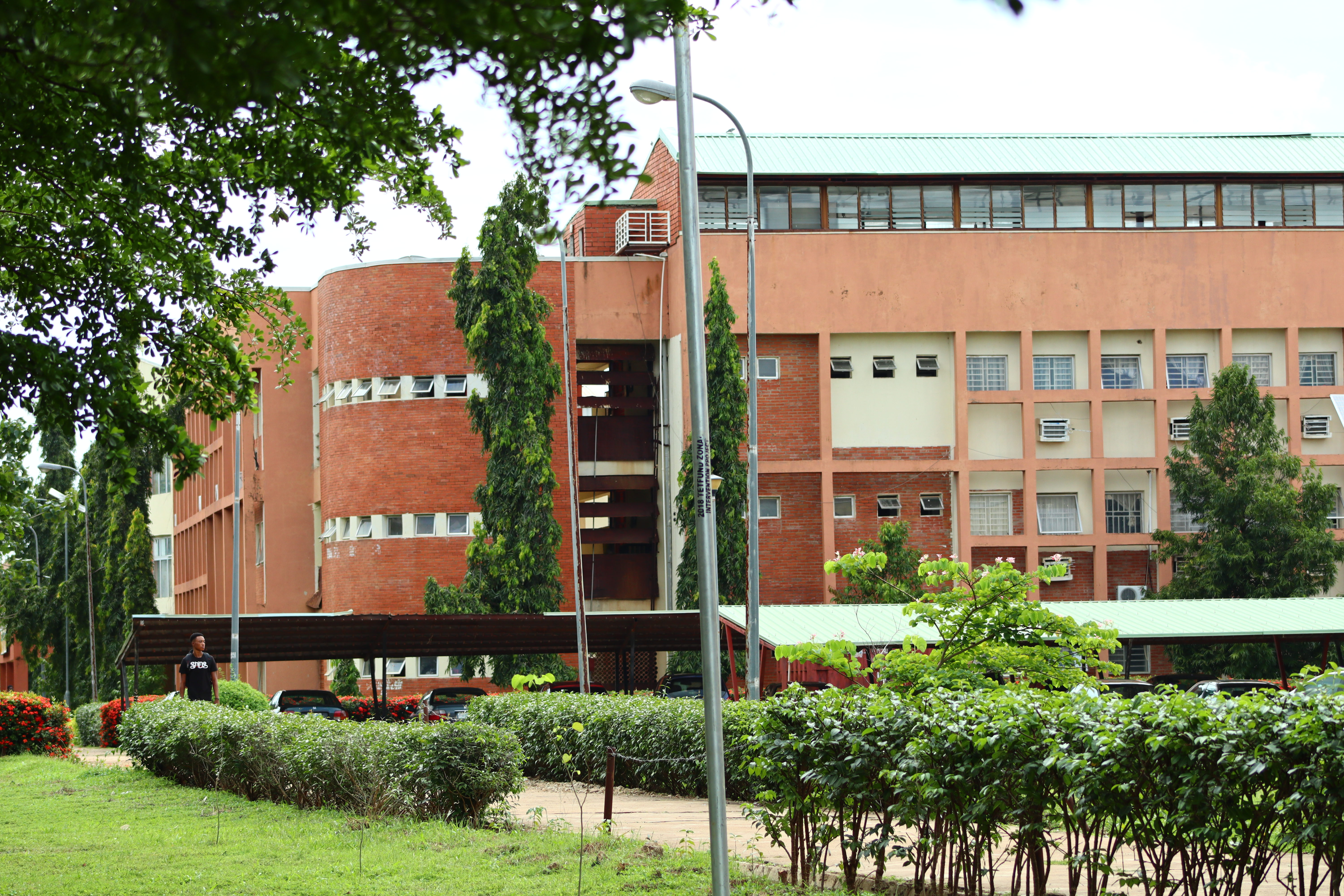
The School of Environmental Technology

== Vice-Chancellors ==
- Prof. Jonathan O. Ndagi (1983-1990)
- Prof. Suleyman O. Adeyemi (1990-1994)
- Prof. Ibrahim H. Umar (1994-1997)
- Prof. Muhammad A. Daniyan (1997-2002)
- Prof. Hamman Sa'ad (2002-2007)
- Prof. Muhammed S. Audu (2007-2012)
- Prof. Musbau A. Akanji (2012-2017)
- Prof. Abdullahi Bala (2017-2022)
- Prof. Faruk Adamu Kuta (2022 - till date)

== Notable alumni ==
- Daniel Etim Effiong, Actor, filmmaker
- Kemi Adesoye, Screenwriter
- Michael Akanji, Sexual Health and Rights Advocate

== See also ==
- List of universities in Nigeria
- Education in Nigeria
