= Michael Akanji =

Nigerian of Yoruba descent (born 1984)

- Pronunciation: Àkànjí
- Born: September 1984 (age 41–42)
- Occupations: Sexual Health and Rights activism
- Years active: 2013
- Employer(s): TIERs, Heartland Alliance International

Michael Akanji (born 1984) is a Nigerian of Yoruba descent. He is a Sexual Health and Rights Advocate. He was the director of The Initiative For Equal Rights (TIERs) and presently, Nigeria's key population advisor for Heartland Alliance International.

== Biography ==
Michael Akanji was born in September 1984. He has studied at the Federal Polytechnic, Nasarawa, Federal University of Technology, Minna and University of San Diego. He is a Sexual Health and Rights Advocate whose works focus on the LGBTQI and HIV/AIDS. Michael works across the West African region. Michael has worked with different organizations including the UN and contributed to research projects such as "Our Voice, Our Future: Young People Report on Progress Made on the UNGASS Declaration of Commitment on HIV/AIDS," and "MSM in Sub-Saharan Africa: Health, Access, & HIV: Findings from the 2012 Global Men’s Health & Rights (GMHR) Study."

He was also a member of the Local Organizing Committee of the First National Conference on Inclusivity, Equality, And Diversity in University Education in Nigeria.

Michael is a 2015 fellow of the United States International Visitor Leadership Program. He is a co author of Through the Gender Lens and has been a contributor and coauthor of a number of publications.
