= Ado Dogo Audu =

Nigerian politician

Member of the House of Representatives
- In office 2003–2011
- Constituency: Jema'a/Sanga Federal Constituency

Personal details
- Born: Kaduna State, Nigeria
- Party: Peoples Democratic Party
- Occupation: Politician

Ado Dogo Audu is a Nigerian politician, public servant, and businessman. He served as a member of the Nigerian House of Representatives for three terms, and has held public office at both federal and state levels. He is currently serving as Counselor for Political Affairs to the Governor of Kaduna State.

== Early life and education ==
Ado Dogo Audu holds a Diploma in Public Administration. He has attended several professional training programmes in Nigeria and abroad, including courses at the International Institute of Labour in Maryland, United States, and Harbour University in London, United Kingdom. He also received specialised training in Water Management in Turin, Italy, as well as Cutting and Polishing in South Korea and Thailand.

== Career ==
=== Political career ===
Audu began his political career as a member of the Nigerian House of Representatives, representing the Jema'a/Sanga Federal Constituency. He served in the House for three terms from 1999 to 2011, during which he held several committee leadership positions. He served as Chairman of the Sub-Committee on Foreign Affairs (Asia-Pacific) from 1999 to 2003, Chairman of the House Committee on Army from 2003 to 2007, and Chairman of the House Committee on Labour, Employment and Productivity from 2007 to 2011. After leaving the National Assembly, Audu served as the Commissioner for Water Resources in Kaduna State from 2013 to 2015. During his tenure, he was responsible for overseeing matters relating to water resources management and development in the state. In 2025, Audu was appointed Counselor for Political Affairs to the Governor of Kaduna State by Governor Uba Sani.

=== Business career ===
Audu has been associated with several mining companies, including Minafric Mining Company Limited, where he serves as Managing Director, Madu Kana Mining Company Limited as a Director, and Narada Mining Company Limited as a Co-Owner.
