= Musibau Adewunmi Akanji =

Nigerian academic

Musbau Adewumi Akanji
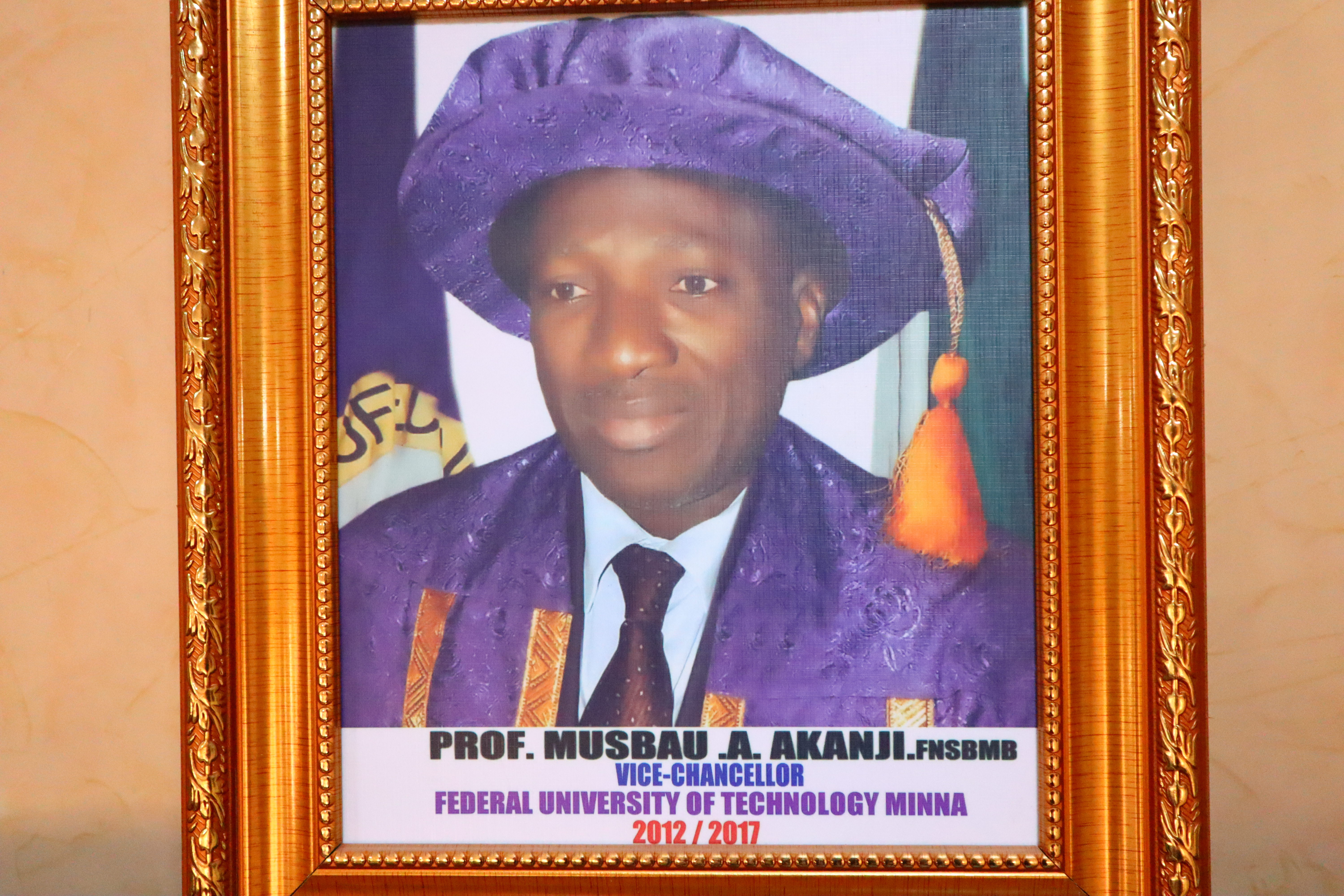

Former Vice-Chancellor of Federal University of Technology, Minna

Personal details
- Born: Musbau Adewumi Akanji; 4 January 1953 (age 73) Offa, Kwara State, Nigeria
- Occupation: Academic; author
- Profession: Biochemist

Musbau Adewumi Akanji is a Nigerian academic, a biochemist and the former Vice-Chancellor of Federal University of Technology, Minna.

== Early life and career ==
Musbau Adewumi Akanji was born on 4 January 1953. He started his education at Offa Grammar School, Offa from 1965 to 1969 and proceed for his A-Levels at Olivet Baptist High School, Oyo from 1970 to 1971 got his first degree, BSc, from University of Ibadan, Ibadan from 1972 to 1975. He attained his MSc and PhD in University of Ife, Ile–Ife (now Obafemi Awolowo University) from 1979 to 1981 and 1983 to 1986 respectively.
