= Adebisi Akanji =

Nigerian artist and chief priest (1935–2023)

- Born: Adebisi; 1935 (age 90–91); Nigeria
- Other name: Olúwo
- Citizenship: Nigeria
- Occupations: Sculptor , artist
- Notable work: National Museum of World Cultures, Smithsonian Museum of African Art, National Black Theatre in Harlem

Adebisi Akanji (1935–2023) was a Nigerian artist as well as the Olúwo (Ògbóni chief priest) of Ilédì Lárọ̀ Ohùntótó - the main Ògbóni Ìbílẹ̀ lodge of Òṣogbo, capital of Ọ̀ṣun State, Nigeria.

== Early life and education ==
In his early life he worked as a bricklayer, and first began to create sculptures as part of a competition to sculpt cement animals based on traditional architectural elements in Yoruba houses.

== Career ==
Akanji is best known for his open-faced cement screens and other sculptural work. He has also worked in textiles. His work often illustrates themes from Yoruba folklore. In collaboration with Susanne Wenger, he worked for a decade on the Osun shrine in Osogbo, Nigeria, and is responsible for many of the shrine's sculptural elements. He also worked with pen/ink drawing and oil painting to create 2-d pieces of art inspired by his cultural identity.

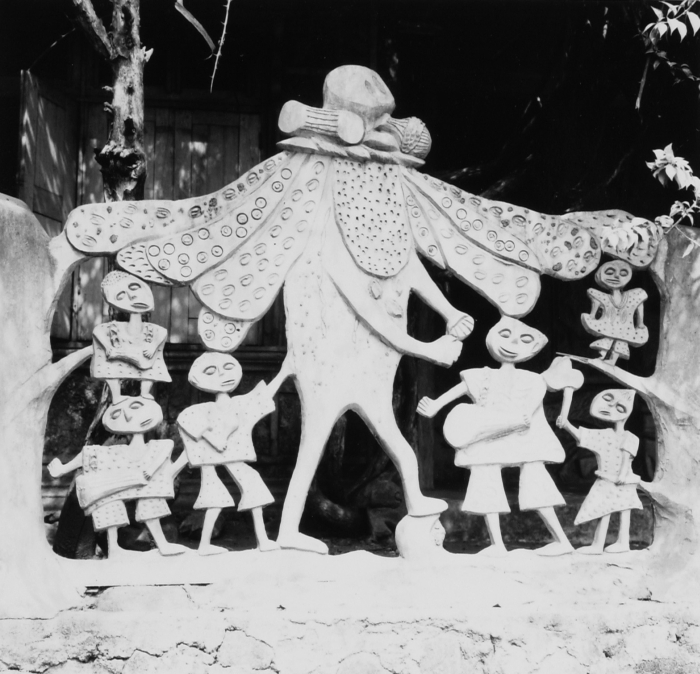
A cement sculpture by Adebisi Akanji at the entrance to the house of Susanne Wenger.
