= List of tertiary institutions in Kwara State =

Kwara is a state in the North Central part of Nigeria with the slogan "State of Harmony" Many tertiary institutions of learning exist there.

== Universities ==
There are many universities in Kwara state, one is owned by the state government, one by the federal government, and many private-owned universities. The Universities are:

- University of Ilorin
- Kwara State University
- Al-Hikmah University
- Summit University, Offa
- University of Offa
- Lens University
- Crown Hill University
- Ojaja University
- Muyhideen College of Education, Ilorin
- Thomas Adewumi University
- Landmark University
- Ahman Pategi University, Patigi

== Colleges ==
Colleges in the state are:

- College of Education Ilorin
- College of Education Oro
- College of Health Technology Offa
- Arolu College of Education Ilemona
- Kwara State College of Education (Technical) Lafiagi
- PAN African College of Education, Offa

== Polytechnics ==
The Polytechnics in the state includes:

- Kwara State Polytechnic
- Federal Polytechnic, Offa
- Lens Polytechnic, Offa
- Graceland Polytechnic Offa
- The Polytechnic, Igbo-Owu
- The Polytechnic, Aran-Orin
