= Tajudeen Owoyemi =

Asiwaju of Offa

- Born: April 1956 (age 70)
- Citizenship: Nigeria
- Occupation: Entrepreneur
- Family: Olugbense

Tajudeen Owoyemi born (15 April 1956) is a Nigerian entrepreneur and the third ASIWAJU of Offa and the chairman/founder of Avalon International Limited.

== Early life and education ==
Owoyemi was born on 15 April 1956 in Offa, Offa Local Government Area of Kwara State, Nigeria. He hails from the ruling Olugbense Royal Family in Offa, and is the son of Alhaji and Alhaja Owoyemi.

== Education ==
He attended St Cyprian's Primary school in Offa and Kaduna Polytechnic for his National Diploma in civil engineering.

== Career ==
Owoyemi is a civil engineer and hospitality entrepreneur.

== Chieftaincy title ==
In 2021, His Royal Majesty Oba Mufutau Gbadamosi Esuwoye II conferred Tajudeen with the title of ASIWAJU of Offa making him the third son of Offa to held the title after chief Josiah Sunday Olawoyin and chief Emmanuel Olatunji Adesoye who had previously held the title as first and second ASIWAJU of Offa respectively.
