= Emmanuel Olatunji Adesoye =

Nigerian entrepreneur (1938-2017)

- Born: 25 April 1937; Offa, Nigeria, Kwara State
- Died: 2017 (aged 79–80); Offa, Nigeria, Kwara State
- Burial place: Offa, Nigeria, Kwara State
- Years active: 1938-2007

Emmanuel Olatunji Adesoye OON, CON (born 25 April 1938 – 2017) was a Nigerian quantity surveyor, entrepreneur, and traditional title holder. He was the first Northern Nigerian quantity surveyor and the second Nigerian Quantity Surveyor. In 2006 President Olusegun Obasanjo awarded him the OON (Officer of the Order of the Niger) and CON (Commander of the Order of the Niger).

== Early life ==
Emmanuel was born to the family of Adesoye in April 1938 in Offa Kwara state Nigeria.

== Education ==
He attended African Bethel School Ebute-Metta Lagos between 1948 and 1951 and St Marks school in 1952 he attended Offa Grammar School between 1953 and 1957 for his secondary school before attending Yaba College of Technology in 1958 he graduated in Nigerian College of Arts, Science, and Technology Enugu in 1959 further his education to South East College of Arts, Science, and Technology UK between 1961 and 1963.

== Awards and honours ==
Adesoye is a Fellow of the Quantity Surveyors London (1965); he was the first Northern Nigerian Quantity Surveyor and the second Nigerian Quantity Surveyor. He is a Fellow of the Royal Institute of Chartered Quantity Surveyors (1968) and a Fellow of the Nigerian Institute of Chartered Quantity Surveyors (1985). He was the chairman of the defunct Afribank (1987–1989). He held the traditional titles of Maye of Offa (1979) and was honoured by the 24th Olofa, HRH Oba Mustapha Olawoore Olanipekun. In 2001, he was honoured with the title of Asiwaju of Offa after the death of the first Asiwaju Of Offa chief Josiah Sunday Olawoyin on 28/4/2001 and was succeeded by Tajudeen Owoyemi. He is the founder of Okin biscuit limited.

== Career ==
He was an experienced quantity surveyor, and the founder and Proprietor of Adesoye college Offa.
