= Sarafa Usman =

Nigerian footballer

Usman Sarafa
Personal information
- Full name: Usman Sarafa
- Date of birth: March 26, 1985 (age 41)
- Place of birth: Offa, Nigeria
- Position: Midfielder

Team information
- Current team: Sunshine Stars F.C.
- Number: 7

Senior career*
Years	Team	Apps	(Gls)
2000–2004	Sunshine Stars F.C.	30	(7)
2003	→ Sharks F.C. (loan)	15	(0)
2005–2009	Kwara United F.C.	80	(5)
2010–present	Sunshine Stars F.C.	17	(4)
- * Club domestic league appearances and goals

Usman Sarafa (born March 26, 1985, in Offa) is a Nigerian football player currently with Sunshine Stars F.C.

== Career ==
An indigene of Offa in Offa local government area of Kwara State, started his football career with Sunshine Stars F.C. of Akure (2000/2001 & 2003/2004), Sharks F.C. of Port Harcourt (2001/2002). In the 2004/5 season's first round of the League, he played for Sunshine Stars F.C. of Port Harcourt, before joined Kwara United F.C. of Ilorin for the second round of the season via the transfer window. In summer 2010 left Kwara United F.C. of Ilorin and signed with Sunshine Stars F.C.
