= Abiodun Musa Aibinu =

Vice-chancellor Summit University Offa

- Born: January 4, 1973 (age 53); Lagos, Nigeria
- Citizenship: Nigerian
- Education: The Polytechnic Ibadan; Obafemi Awolowo University; Blekinge Institute of Technology; International Islamic University Malaysia
- Occupations: Academic; engineer
- Office: Vice Chancellor of Summit University Offa
- Predecessor: H. O. B Oloyede

Abiodun Musa Aibinu (born 4 January 1973) is a Nigerian Professor of Mechatronics from the Federal University Of Technology, Minna. He is currently the Vice Chancellor of Summit University, Offa

== Early life and education ==
Abiodun Musa Aibinu was born in Lagos, Nigeria but he is a native of Ibadan, Oyo State. He earned his National Diploma in Electrical and Electronics Engineering in 1995 from The Polytechnic of Ibadan. He was awarded his Bachelor of Science degree from Obafemi Awolowo University. He received his Master of Science in Engineering at Blekinge Tekniska Hogskola in 2006. He specializes in mechanics, robotics and automation engineering. He completed his Engineering PhD in Mechanic, robotic and automation from International Islamic University of Malaysia in 2010.

== Chieftaincy titles ==
On 31 July 2023, the Olubadan of Ibadan, Mahood Olalekan Balogun, conferred the chieftaincy title of Mogaji Aikulola-Aibinuomo family to Aibinu. The investiture took place at the Olubadan Palace, Itutaliba, Ibadan, and was attended by Olubadan-in-Council members and dignitaries. The title of Mogaji represents the headship of a large family and holds significant importance in Olubadan Chieftaincy Matters.

== Publications ==
- Performance Evaluation of You Only Look Once v4 in Road Anomaly Detection and Visual Simultaneous Localisation and Mapping for Autonomous Vehicles
- Smart Pipeline Monitoring System: A Review
- Development of an Intelligent Road Anomaly Detection System for Autonomous Vehicles
- Advances in visual simultaneous localisation and mapping techniques for autonomous vehicles: A review
- Overview of Satellite Communications and its Applications in Telemedicine for the underserved in Nigeria: A case study
- Telemedicine as a panacea to medical tourism in Africa: Exploiting communication satellite technologies November 2022
- Artificial Intelligence-Based Plant Leaf Disease Identification: A Review
- Automatic parking management system and parking fee collection based on number plate recognition
- An optimized routing algorithm for vehicle ad-hoc networks
- Vascular intersection detection in retina fundus images using a new hybrid approach
- A novel clustering based genetic algorithm for route optimization
- New road anomaly detection and characterization algorithm for autonomous vehicles
- Unmanned Aerial Vehicle (UAV) applications in coastal zone management—A review
- Comparative analysis of basic models and artificial neural network based model for path loss prediction
- Image processing techniques for automated road defect detection: A survey
- Breast cancer histopathology image classification with deep convolutional neural networks
- A proposed Fish counting algorithm, using Digital Image Processing Techniques
- Application of neural networks in early detection and diagnosis of Parkinson's disease
- Automatic diagnosis of diabetic retinopathy using fundus images
- Development of solar powered irrigation system
