= Lens University =

Private university in Ilemona, Nigeria

Lens University Ilemona
- Motto: "Skills, Knowledge, Research & Ethics"
- Type: Private
- Established: 2025
- Students: 3,000
- Location: Ilemona, Kwara State, Nigeria
- Website: lensuniversity.com.ng

Lens University is a private university located in Ilemona, Oyun Local Government Area, Kwara State, Nigeria. It was established in 2025 and is licensed by the National Universities Commission (NUC). The university was approved by President Bola Ahmed Tinubu, along with 10 other private universities in Nigeria, on March 3, 2025.

Although still in its early years of operation, the university aims to build a reputation for innovation, ethical leadership, and academic excellence. With its focus on modern facilities, research-driven teaching, and career-oriented programmes, the institution seeks to prepare students to contribute meaningfully to Nigeria's social and economic development.

== Historical Background ==
Lens University was officially approved on 3 March 2025 when the President of Nigeria, Bola Ahmed Tinubu, granted operational licenses to eleven new private universities across the country.

Following this approval, the university's proprietors received a provisional license of operation from the National Universities Commission, allowing the institution to commence academic activities. This development marked a significant milestone in the expansion of tertiary education in Nigeria.

The university is located along Offa–Irra Road in Ilemona, a community within Kwara State. Its establishment was partly motivated by the growing demand for university education in Nigeria and the need for institutions that combine theoretical knowledge with practical skills.

As a new institution, Lens University is gradually developing its academic structure, physical infrastructure, and academic culture while positioning itself among emerging private universities in the country.

== Administration and Chancellery of Lens University ==
The administrative structure of Lens University, located in Ilemona, Kwara State, is designed to ensure effective governance, academic leadership, and institutional development. Like many Nigerian universities, the university operates through a hierarchical administrative framework that includes the proprietor, governing authorities, and principal officers responsible for the management of academic and non-academic affairs.

Proprietor and Founding Leadership

The university is owned and promoted by private proprietors who played a key role in establishing the institution after it received approval from the Nigerian government in 2025. Among the key figures associated with the founding of the university are Dr. Azeez Yisa and Abdulazeez Isiaq, who are recognized as proprietors behind the project. Their efforts were instrumental in securing approval from the National Universities Commission and mobilizing resources for the establishment of the university.

As proprietors, they provide strategic direction and financial oversight for the institution. Their role involves ensuring that the university maintains its vision of promoting research, ethical leadership, and high academic standards.

The Vice-Chancellor

The chief academic and administrative officer of the university is the Vice-Chancellor. At the early stage of the institution's development, Dr. Azeez Yisa has served as the Vice-Chancellor, overseeing the overall administration and academic operations of the university.

The Vice-Chancellor is responsible for:

- Providing academic leadership to the university
- Supervising faculties, departments, and academic programmes
- Implementing policies approved by the university governing bodies
- Ensuring discipline, academic integrity, and student welfare
- Representing the university in national and international academic forums

During the university's first matriculation ceremony in 2025, the Vice-Chancellor emphasized the institution's commitment to world-class education and warned students against social vices such as cultism and misconduct, highlighting the administration's focus on discipline and moral values.

University Management

The university's management structure typically includes several principal officers who assist the Vice-Chancellor in administering the institution. Although the university is still developing its administrative framework, the management generally consists of positions such as:

- Registrar – responsible for administrative coordination and records
- Bursar – oversees financial management and budgeting
- University Librarian – manages library services and academic resources
- Deans of Faculties – supervise academic activities within faculties
- Directors and administrative officers

Together, these officers ensure that the university's academic, financial, and administrative operations run efficiently.

Governing Authorities

The governance of Lens University is expected to follow the standard structure adopted by most Nigerian universities. This structure typically includes:

- Board of Trustees / Proprietorial Board – representing the owners and providing overall policy direction
- Governing Council – responsible for strategic decisions, appointments, and institutional policies
- University Senate – the highest academic body responsible for curriculum, examinations, and academic regulations

These bodies work collectively to maintain academic standards and ensure that the university complies with regulations established by the National Universities Commission, which regulates university education in Nigeria.

== Vision and Mission ==
Like many modern private universities, Lens University is guided by a clear vision and mission focused on education, innovation, and societal impact.

Vision

The vision of the university is to become a globally recognized institution that promotes innovation, research, and leadership, producing graduates who can shape the future of society.

Mission

Its mission is to empower students with knowledge, practical skills, and ethical values that will enable them to succeed professionally and contribute to national development.

To achieve these goals, the university emphasizes:

- Academic excellence
- Research and innovation
- Ethical leadership
- Industry-relevant education
- Holistic student development

== Academic Structure ==
Lens University offers a variety of undergraduate programmes organized into several faculties. During the initial accreditation phase, the National Universities Commission approved seventeen academic programmes for the university's take-off.

These programmes are distributed across different academic disciplines to provide students with opportunities in science, health sciences, media, and social sciences.

== Faculty of Science and Computing ==
This faculty focuses on technological and scientific education. It aims to train students in modern computing systems, digital technologies, and biological sciences.

Programmes include:

- Microbiology
- Computer Science
- Cyber Security
- Information Technology

These programmes emphasize analytical thinking, technological innovation, and research.

== Faculty of Management and Social Sciences ==
The faculty prepares students for leadership roles in business, governance, and media industries.

Courses offered include:

- Accounting
- Business Administration
- Entrepreneurship Studies
- Public Administration
- Library and Information Science
- Mass Communication
- Journalism and Media Studies
- Film and Multimedia Studies

The programmes combine theoretical instruction with practical training to develop skills in leadership, communication, and business management.

== Faculty of Basic Medical and Allied Health Sciences ==
This faculty focuses on health-related disciplines and aims to produce professionals capable of contributing to the healthcare sector.

Programmes include:

- Medical Laboratory Science
- Public Health
- Nursing Science
- Pharmacology
- Physiology

These programmes provide foundational medical knowledge and laboratory training necessary for healthcare careers.

== Campus and Facilities ==
Although still developing, Lens University aims to provide a modern learning environment equipped with facilities that support academic excellence and research. Some of the key facilities include:

- Well-equipped lecture halls
- Modern laboratories
- Digital libraries and academic resources
- Student accommodation
- Sports and recreational centres

The university also emphasizes the integration of technology into teaching and learning, allowing students to access digital resources and participate in innovative research projects.

== Role in Nigerian Higher Education ==
The establishment of Lens University reflects the continued expansion of Nigeria's private university sector. Private universities have become increasingly important in Nigeria because they help address several challenges, including:

- Limited spaces in public universities
- Frequent academic strikes
- The need for specialized programmes

By providing additional opportunities for higher education, Lens University contributes to the national goal of increasing access to tertiary education and developing skilled professionals.

== See also ==
- Kwara State University
- Al-Hikmah University
- Fountain University
- Summit University
- Offa, Nigeria
