= Offa Medical Centre =

Nigerian Medical Centre

Geography
- Location: Offa, Kwara State Nigeria, Northern Region, Kwara State, Nigeria

History
- Opened: 2019

Offa Medical Centre (Popularly known as OMC) is a private sector-driven health care intervention by members of the Offa Metropolitan club it was established in 2019 and located in Offa, Kwara State Nigeria.

== History ==
The Offa Medical Centre was established in 2019 with the aim of enhancing healthcare services in Offa and surrounding areas in Kwara state. The Offa Metropolitan Club under the leadership of President Dr. Sarah Alade, donated the medical centre to the Offa Specialist Hospital, emphasizing the significance of community involvement in healthcare service delivery. The centre aims to discourage medical tourism by providing quality healthcare services locally said by the president. The Offa Metropolitan Club's partnership with Clina-Lancent Laboratories to ensures the efficient operation of the medical centre.

== Facilities ==
The medical centre facilities include laboratory tests, radiology unit, CT scan machines, theatre, x-ray, and maternity unit for mother and child.
