= Ijakadi Festival =

Nigerian Cultural Festival

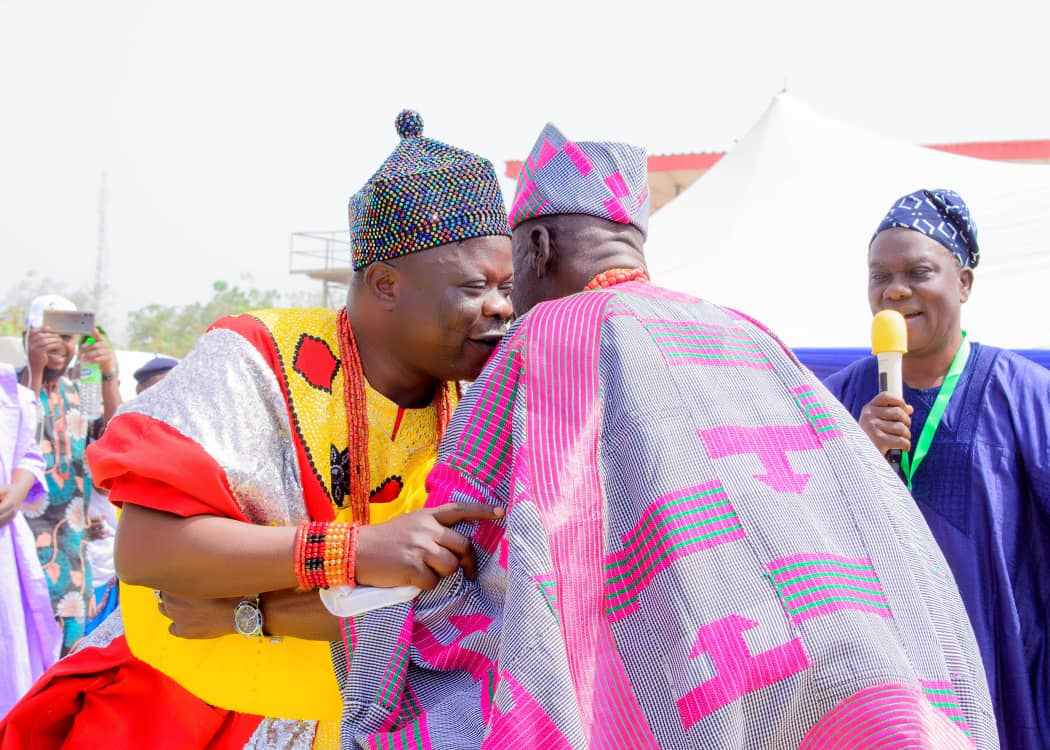
- Olofa and Essa
- Language: Yoruba

Origin
- Meaning: Local Wrestling
- Region of origin: Northern Region, Nigeria

The Ijakadi Festival is an annual cultural festival in Offa, Kwara state, Nigeria. It is usually held in December. The festival aims to promote traditional culture and values, community ties, and tourism and socio-economic development.

== Name ==
The word 'Ijakadi' literally means 'wrestling' which has a significant role in the history of Offa.

== Celebrations ==
The festival opens with prayers. During the festival, the people of Offa wear traditional clothes and put on masquerades, dancing, and drumming. There is also mock wrestling between olofa of Offa and the highest chief Essa. In the 21st century, organizers have also introduced events such as cultural lectures and youth dinners.

The festival ends with a ceremonial cutting of yam tubers, meant to demonstrate equality and unity among the residents of the town.

== Gallery ==
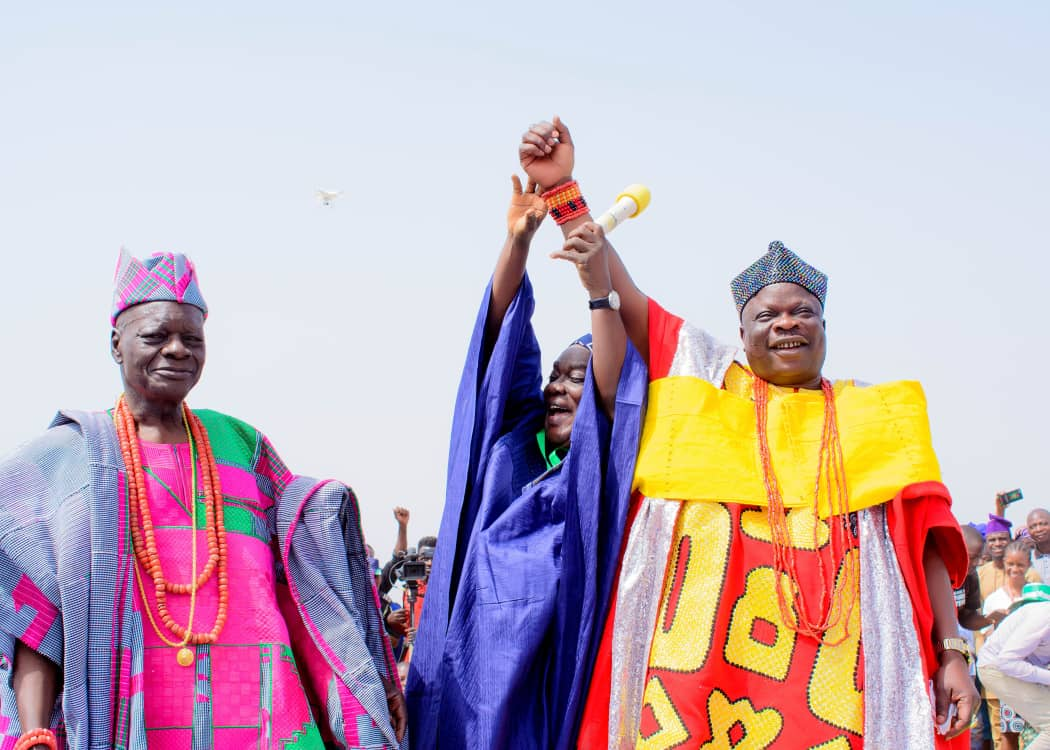
The Olofa of Offa during the Ijakadi Festival

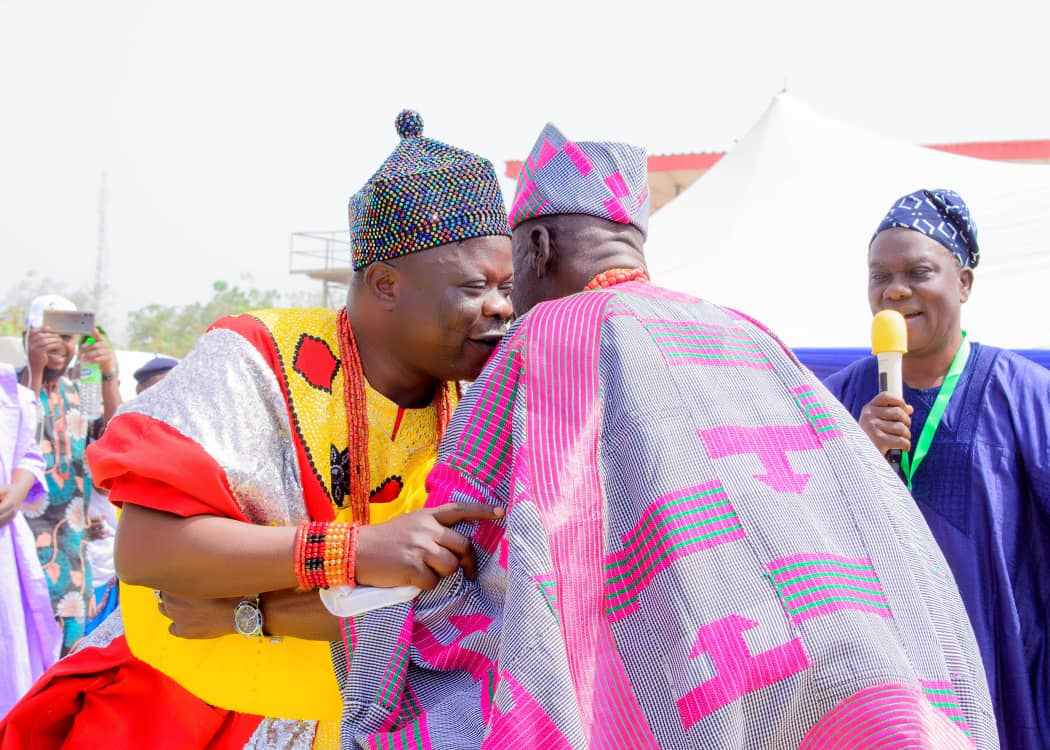
The Olofa of Offa during the Ijakadi Festival

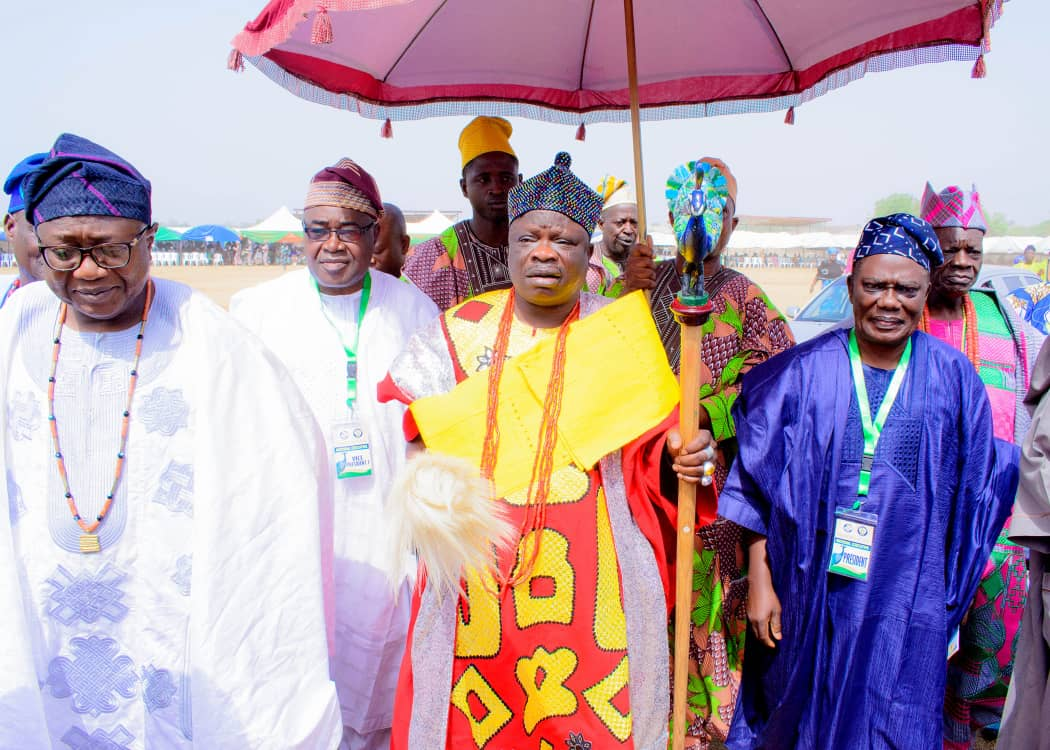
The Olofa of Offa during the Ijakadi Festival
