= University of Offa =

Private university in Offa, Nigeria

- Motto: Building a Brighter Future Through Education
- Type: Private
- Established: 2021
- Founder: Rasaq Omoniyi Oyewale
- Vice-Chancellor: Kazeem Alagbe Gbolagade
- Students: 3,000
- Location: Offa, Kwara State, Nigeria
- Website: https://www.unioffa.edu.ng

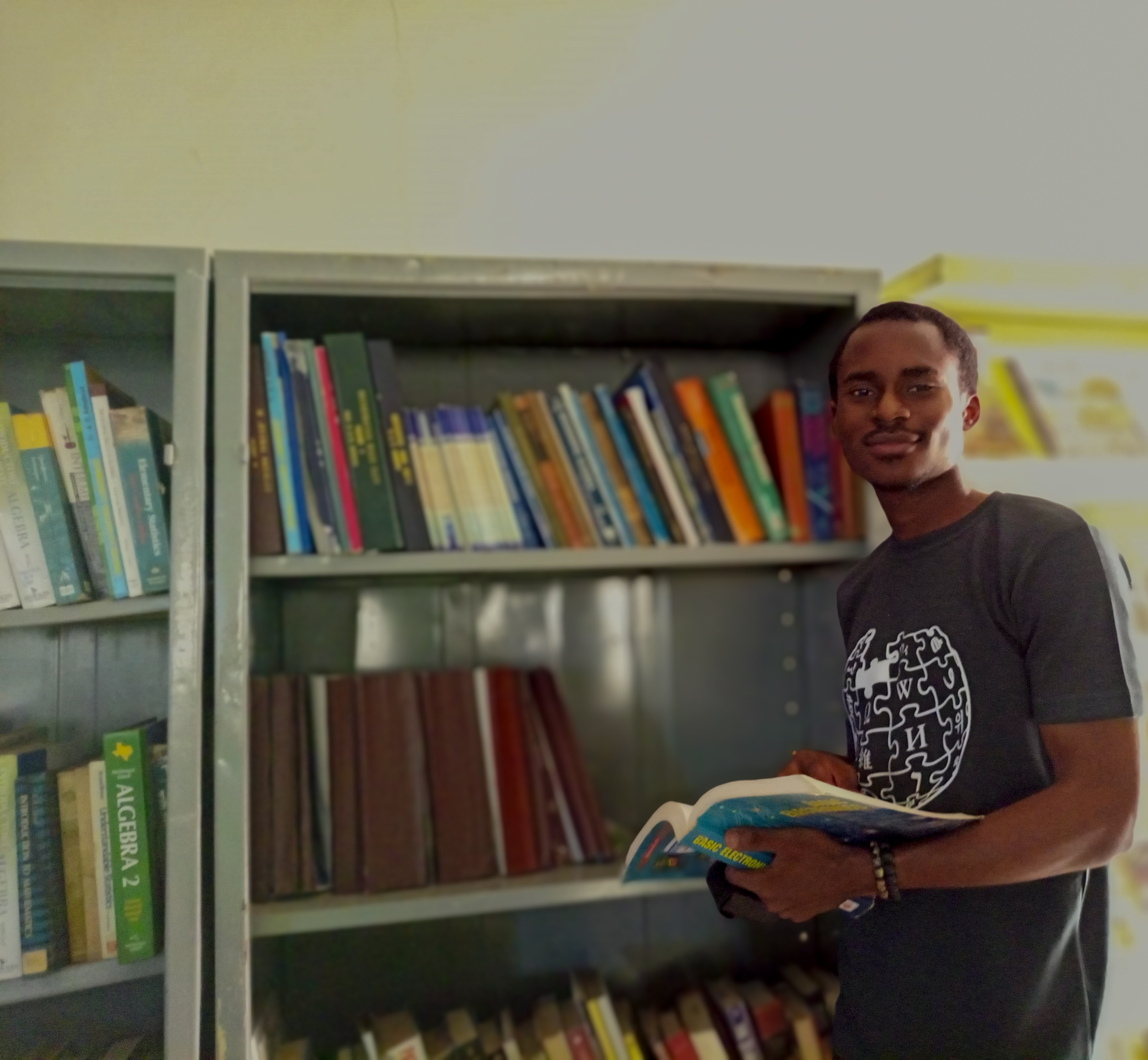
Lens_Polytechnic_Offa_Library,_Kwara_State

University of Offa is a privately owned, government-approved tertiary institution located in Offa, Offa Local Government Area, Kwara State, Nigeria. The university is regulated by the Federal Ministry of Education and is licensed by the National Universities Commission (NUC), which oversees the regulation of tertiary institutions in Nigeria. The university was approved by President Muhammadu Buhari, along with 20 other private universities in Nigeria, on February 3, 2021. The university was granted a provisional license by the Ministry of Education, under the leadership of then Minister of Education, Mallam Adamu Adamu, to operate for the next three years, pending ongoing monitoring and evaluation before being considered for a full license.

== Vice chancellors ==
• Prof. Raheem Adebayo Lawal (2021 - 2025) pioneer vice chancellor.

• Prof. Kazeem Alagbe Gbolagade (2025 - till date)

== See also ==
- Kwara State University
- Al-Hikmah University
- Fountain University
- Summit University
- Offa, Nigeria
