= Suleiman Olatunji Omituntun =

Nigerian politician

Hon Suleiman Olatunji Omituntun
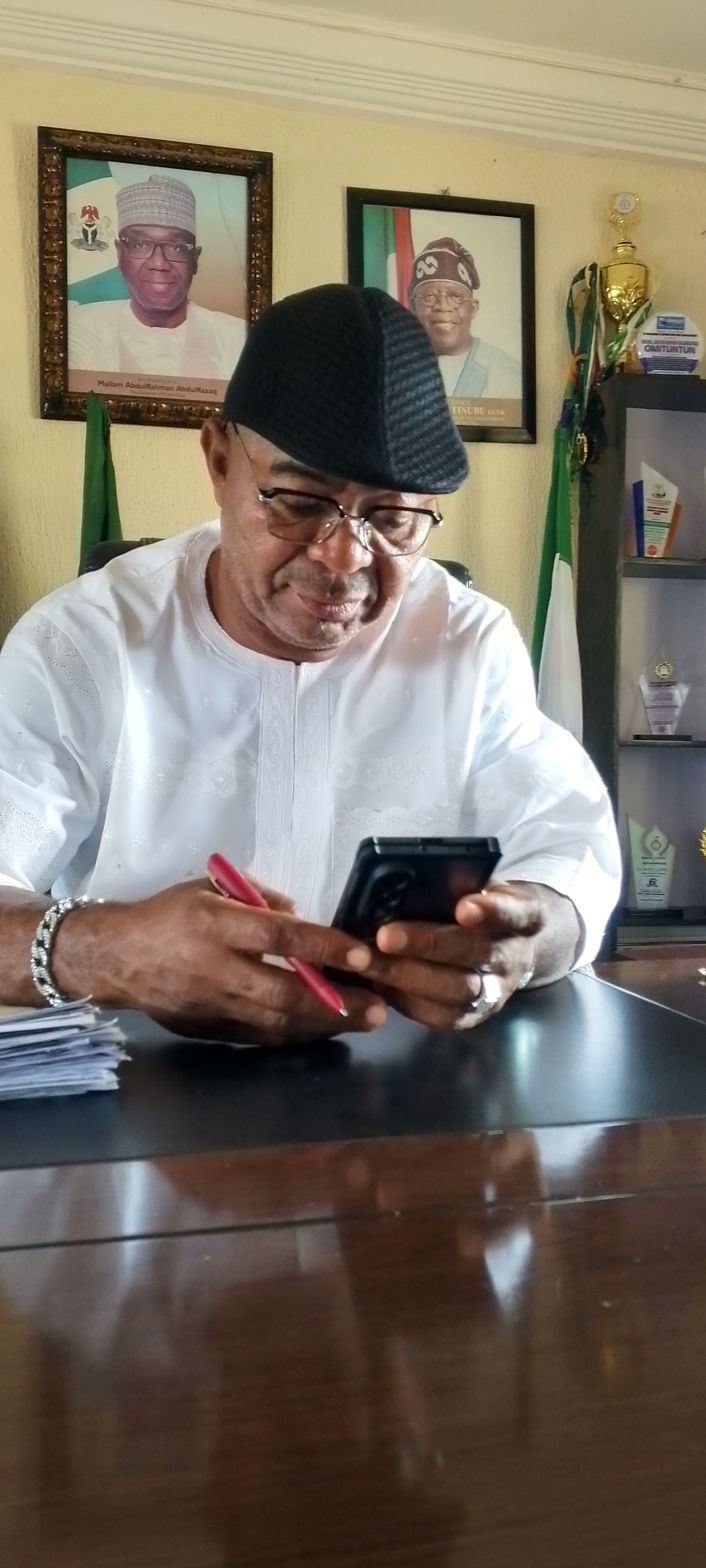

Chairman of Offa Local Government
- Incumbent
- Assumed office September 2024
- Preceded by: Hon Jare Olatundun

Personal details
- Born: Suleiman Olatunji Omituntun; 12 September 1970 (age 56)
- Party: All Progressives Congress
- Occupation: Politician

Suleiman Olatunji Omituntun is a Nigerian politician and the Executive Chairman of Offa Local Government Area in Kwara State. He is a member of the All Progressives Congress (APC) and assumed office following his victory in the 2024 local government elections.

== Early life and education ==
Suleiman was born in offa, and currently serving as the executive chairman of offa local government area of Kwara State.

== Political career ==
=== Emergence and election ===
Suleiman emerged as the Chairman of Offa Local Government after contesting under the platform of the All Progressives Congress APC in the September 2024 local government elections. He secured a total votes of 22,400 votes, defeating candidates from other political parties including the Accord Party and the People’s Democratic Party (PDP).

=== Achievements ===
Suleiman has been associated with grassroots development initiatives, such as construction of 1.1-kilometre (0.68 mi) Isale-Ago–Ogba Arogun–St, 1.1-kilometre (0.68 mi) Anilelerin–Ayaba–Iyeru Okin Road, 400-metre (0.25 mi; 440 yd) Emiola–Unique–Olalomi Road, seven culverts across 3 locations, refurnished the legislative chamber, graded 45 kilometres (28 mi) of roads, provision of transformers, social welfare, allocation of 1,000 hectares (12,000,000 sq yd) of land for agriculture, and many other community-based programs.
