= Owode Market =

Market in Kwara, Nigeria

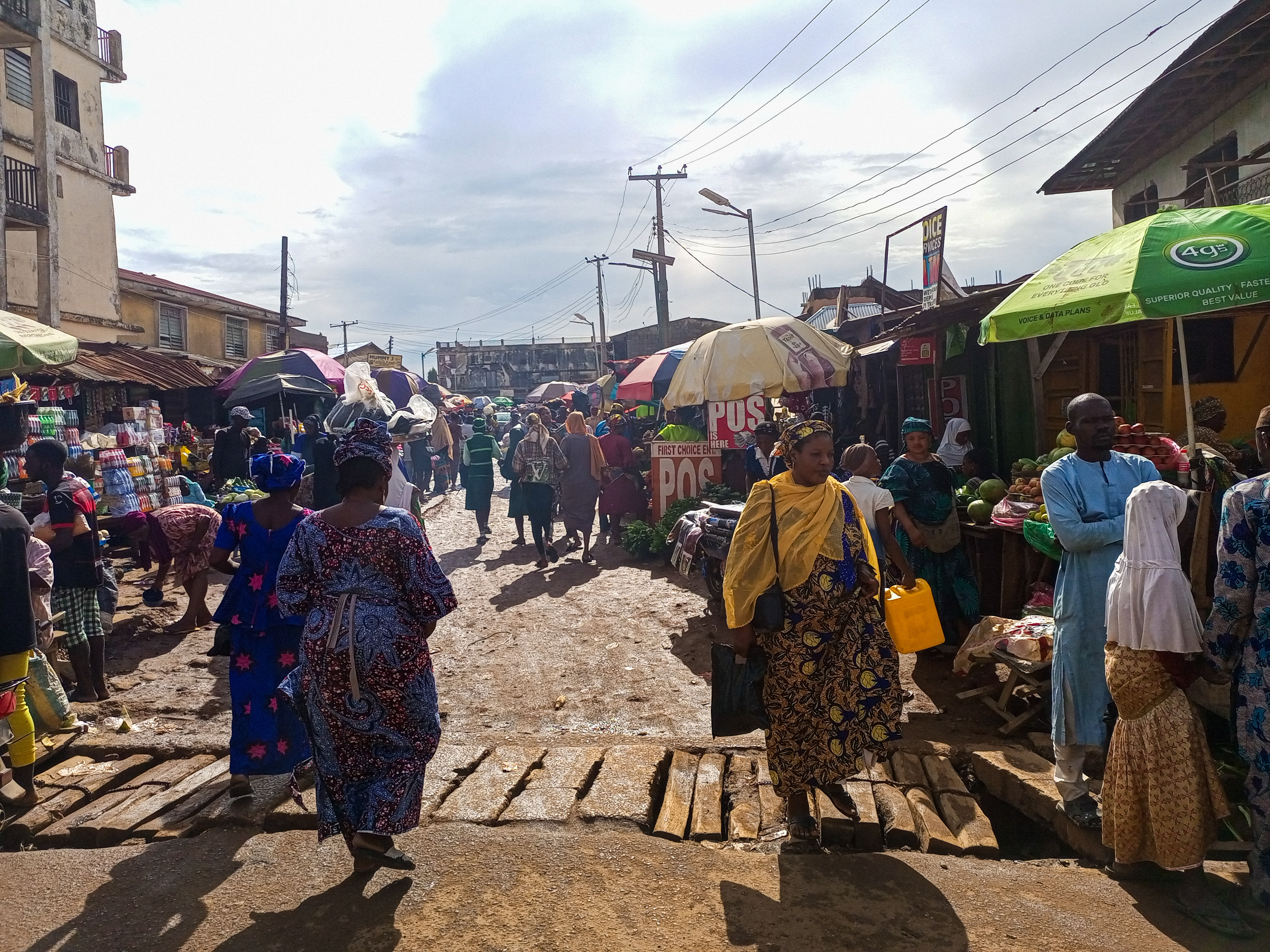
Entrance of Owode Market Offa

Owode Market is a large market in Offa, Kwara State, Nigeria.

The market serves as a major source of economic growth for Offa and surrounding communities including the nearby villages of Ijagbo, Erin-ile, Ojoku, Ikotun, Igosun, Ilemona, Irra, Inisha.

== History ==
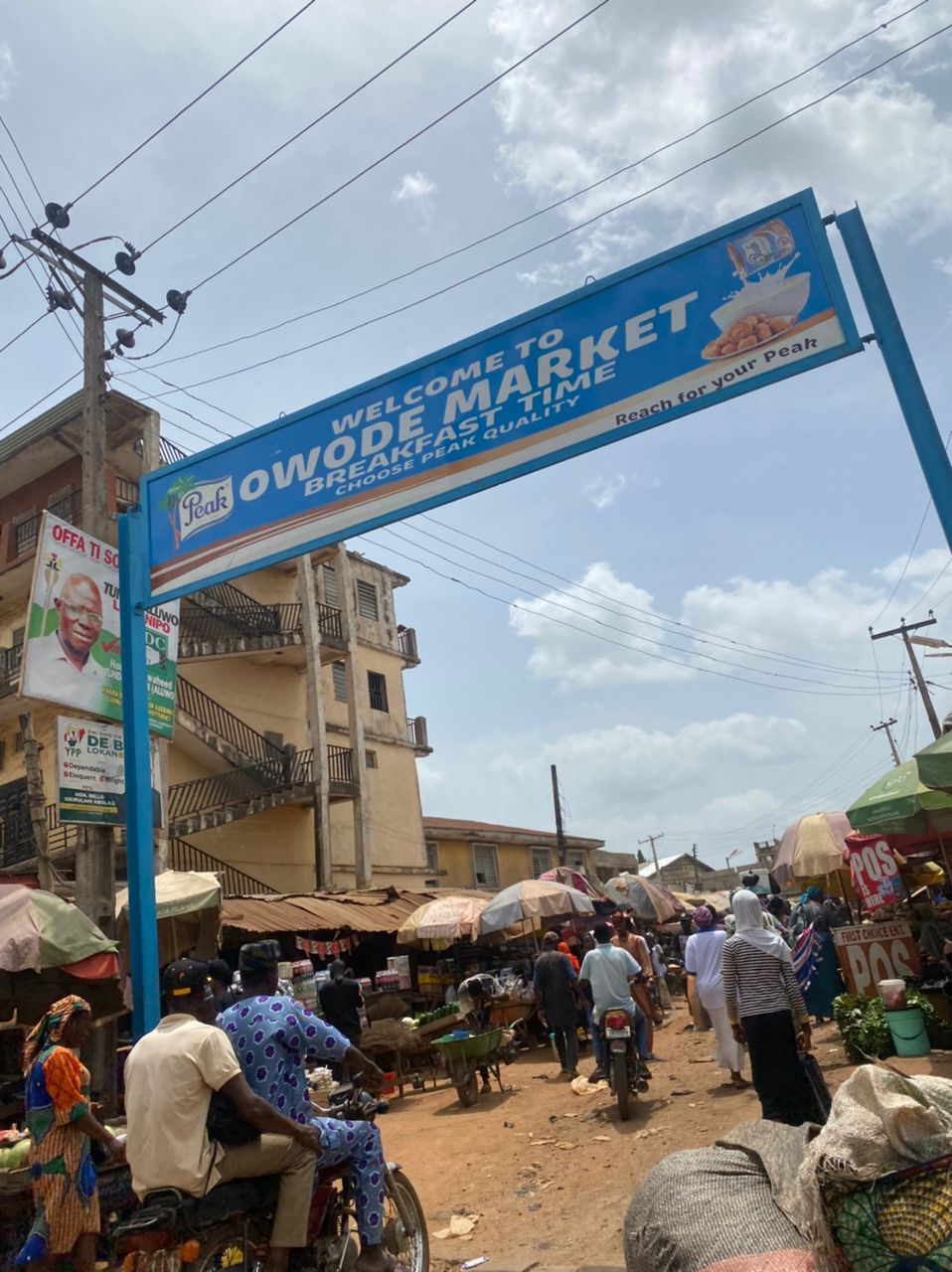
Owode Market sign board

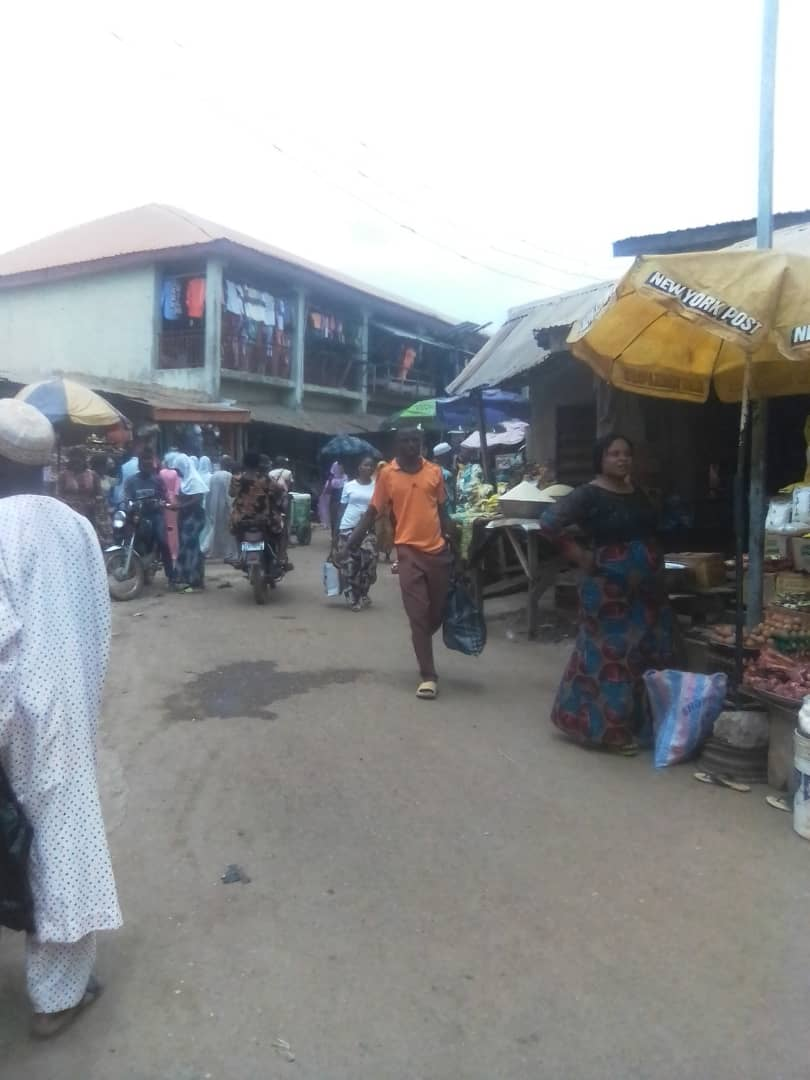
Image of Owode Market entrance

=== Offa robbery ===
On 5 April 2018, the town of Offa experienced a robbery which resulted in the loss of 18 lives, comprising nine police officers and eight civilians. The Owode Market was affected during this incident.

=== Owode fire ===
The Owode Market has experienced numerous fire incidents resulting in the loss of goods worth millions of naira. The Offa Descendants' Union, a predominant social and cultural group within the community, intervened to assist the affected market vendors, prior to support from the state government. Their assistance paved the way for the establishment of the Owode Ultra Modern Market: the reconstruction and renovation of the market to meet national standards, made possible with contributions from various philanthropists and benefactors within the community. Since these developments, the Owode Market has undergone significant transformations.

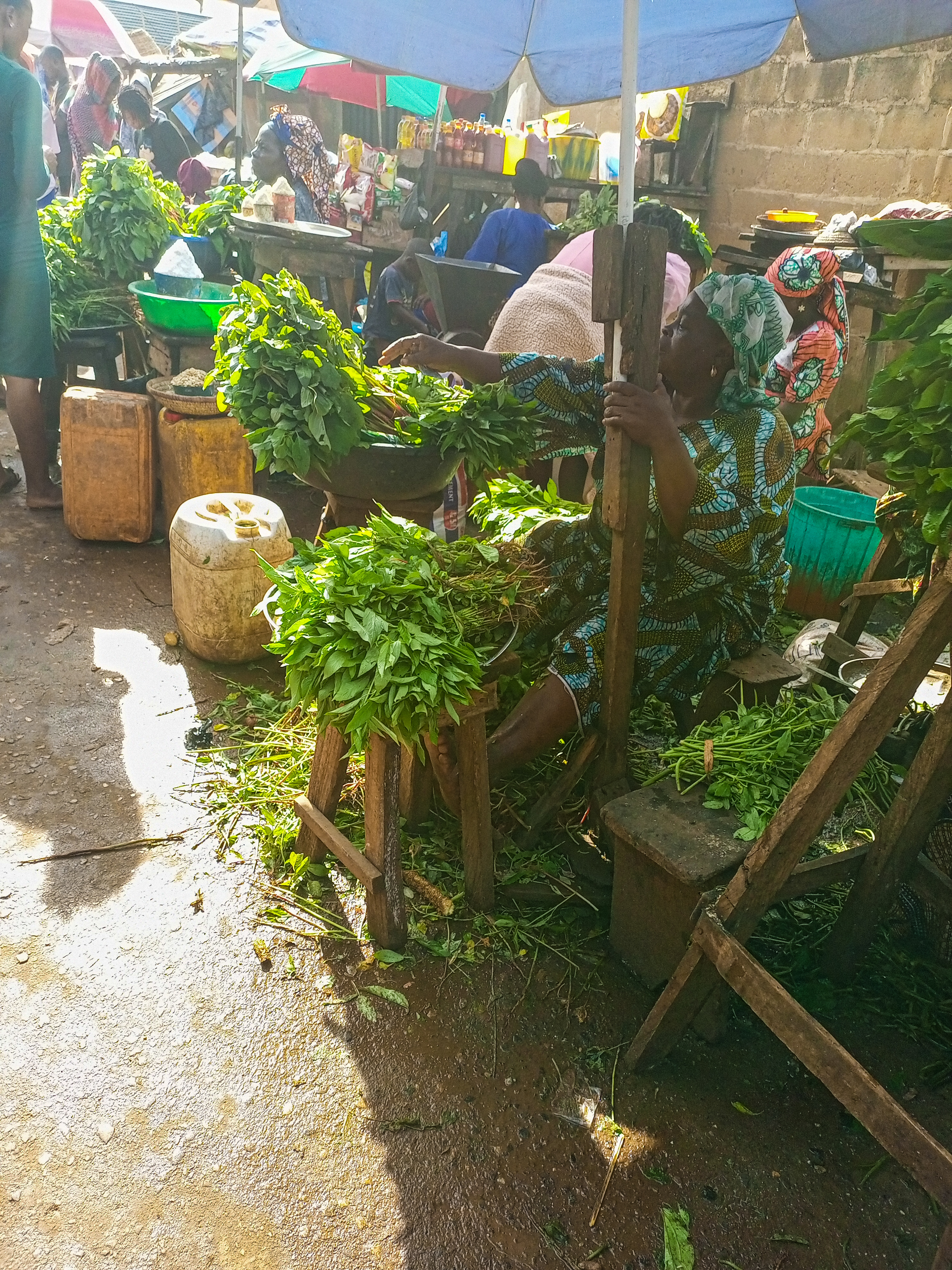
Vegetables
