= Erin-Ile =

Town in Kwara State, Nigeria

Erin-Ile is a town and agrarian community in the Oyun LGA of Kwara State, Nigeria. The town was formerly the local government headquarters of Oyun before it was moved to the town of Ilemona. Erin-Ile was founded around 1225AD by prince Odumasa Apayaan (the first Elerin) and other warriors such as Olowe and others. Erin-ile has been in existence before Offa and migrated from Ile ife.

== About ==
Erin Ile is a town with a large expanse of arable land. Erin Ile shares boundaries with Ilemona, Irra, Offa, Eku-Apa, Ipee and Igosun all in Kwara State and Oyan, Ila Orangun and Ila Odo in Osun State. Culturally, Erin Ile is a typical Yoruba town.

== History ==
The historical origin of Erin Ile revolves around Odumosa Apaayan, an illustrious Ife Prince who's a renowned Hunter and his younger brother, Alawode Arebiope, both of them children of Obalufon Alayemore and grandchildren of King Obalufon Ogbogbodirin of Ile Ife. The Obalufon festival is an annual festival held in Erin-Ile in honor of their ancestors from Ife. Erin Ile speak the Ibolo dialect of the Yoruba language.

== Moje College of Education ==
Moje College of education is a government accredited college of education in Erin-Ile. The college has programs in education, language, sciences, arts and social sciences.

== Government Institutions in Erin Ile ==
Erin Ile is served by a general hospital and other government cottages (rural/primary health centers) to cater for the health care needs of the populace. There is a Divisional Police Head Quarter and a magistrate court, as well as an upper area (customary) court to help in curtailing the crime rate.

== Hospitality ==
There are places where visitors to the community can relax or lodge to pass some nights. These include Marpedom Hotel ( 3 star), Starpop Hotel, Darwish Hotel, to mention a few.

== Riots with Offa ==
Erin-Ile have been in several conflicts with neighboring town Offa over land for several years since 1973 when the Supreme Court first ruled on the issue. In 2013, the federal polytechnic in Offa was closed down due to the riots. The Masjid Noor and the descendant union in Offa were vandalised. Erin-Ile was under attack as well, which resulted in people living at the border relocating.
