= Mufutau Gbadamosi Esuwoye II =

25th Olofa Of Offa Kingdom

Mufutau Gbadamosi Esuwoye ||
- Olofa Of Ofa
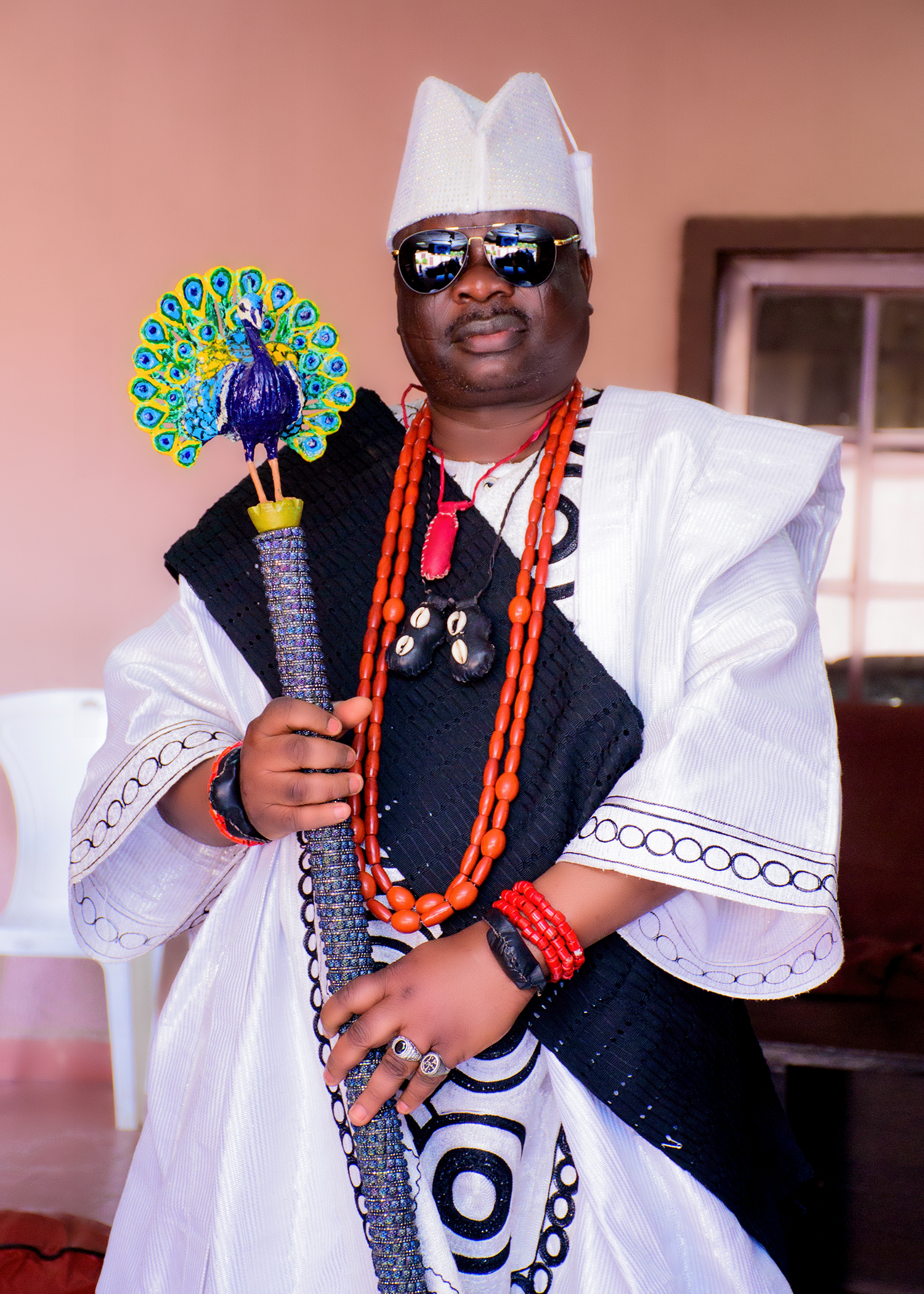
- Coronation: 9 May 2010
- Predecessor: Oba Mustapha Olawoore Olanipekun
- Born: 10 August 1963 (age 62); Offa
Names
- Mufutau Gbadamosi Esuwoye Okikiola Oloyede
- House: Anilelerin
- Dynasty: Esuwoye
- Father: Esuwoye
- Religion: Islam
- Occupation: Businessman

Mufutau Gbadamosi Esuwoye II (born 10 August 1963) is a Nigerian monarch. He is the 25th Olofa Of Offa.

== Birth ==
Mufutau Gbadamosi Esuwoye II was born on 10 August 1963 to the family of Alhaji Muhammed Gbadamosi Esuwoye and Alhaja Awawu Gbadamosi Esuwoye, both of Obatiwajoye and Asalofa Compounds in Offa Local Government Area of Kwara State, Nigeria.

== Education ==
Oba Mufutau attended Maru Teachers College, Gusau, between 1976 and 1981, obtaining the grade II Teachers Certificate. He then attended Birni-Kebbi Polytechnic between 1982 and 1985 for his National Diploma (ND) in Building Technology. In 1989 he earned his Bachelor of Science Degree in Building Technology from Ahmadu Bello University, Zaria.

== See also ==
- Monarchy of Nigeria (1960–1963)
