= Josiah Sunday Olawoyin =

Nigerian politician (1925–2000)

Chief Josiah Sunday Olawoyin

Ward councillor
- In office 1 October 1955 – 1 October 1979

House of Assembly
- In office 1956–1961

Personal details
- Born: Josiah Sunday Olawoyin; 5 February 1905 Offa, Nigeria, Northern Nigeria Protectorate (now in Kwara State, Nigeria)
- Died: 10 October 2000 (aged 75) Offa, Nigeria, Kwara State, Nigeria
- Party: Unity Party of Nigeria (1978–1983); Action Group (1950–1966)
- Spouse: Ruth Mopelola Olalonpe Olawoyin (m. 1937)
- Children: 9
- Profession: Journalist, lawyer, Businessman

Chief Josiah Sunday Olawoyin (5 February 1925 – 10 October 2000) was a Nigerian politician, journalist and businessman who served as the first Asiwaju of Offa between 25 April 1982 to 10 October 2000. In 1979 general election he was the governorship candidate of Unity Party of Nigeria (UPN) for Kwara State governorship election which Adamu Atta of the National Party of Nigeria (NPN) was declared winner.

== Early life and education ==
Olawoyin was born on 5 February 1925 in Offa, Offa Local Government area of Kwara State. He was a businessman, journalist and politician.

== Political career ==
Olawoyin previously served as a ward councillor, member of the Northern Region House of Assembly in Kaduna between 1956 and 1961. He was the opposition leader at the Northern Region House of Assembly during the time. During the 1979 gubernatorial election, he was the governorship candidate for Kwara state. He advocated for the merger of the Ilorin and Kabba provinces, proposing the creation of a state with its capital in Ilorin. This idea was supported by the late AGF Abdul-Razaq, father of Kwara State's current executive governor, Mallam AbdulRahman AbdulRazaq. Kwara State was established on 27 May 1967, as West Central State during the military regime. In 1979, Olawoyin was the governorship candidate for the Unity Party of Nigeria (UPN) during the governorship election, and he lost to Adamu Atta of the National Party of Nigeria (NPN). In September 1962, Olawoyin along 30 others were charged to court along chief Obafemi Awolowo for treason and acquitted from the allegation of treasonable felony in November 1963.

== Posthumous birthday ==
The family of J.S. Olawoyin commemorated his 100th posthumous birthday on 5 February 2025, by launching a foundation and a book in his honor. The book, titled "J.S. Olawoyin: A Century of Legacy and Leadership," is a compendium with a foreword written by Banji Ogundele and a review by Dr. Lasisi Olagunju. The event drew many dignitaries, including Senator Yisa Oyelola Ashiru, the deputy senate leader who represents Kwara South at the Nigeria National Assembly. Senator Ashiru described Chief Olawoyin as "a leading light in the political trajectory of Offa and the then Northern Nigeria." Professor Yusuf Olaolu Ali (SAN), a legal luminary and the chairman of the occasion and also spoke at the event. He praised Chief Olawoyin's political career, noting his impact on his constituency and the larger region he described him as one of the most formidable man in the opposition camp during his lifetime.
