= Offa Specialist Hospital =

Coordinates: 7.6977°N 5.0476°E

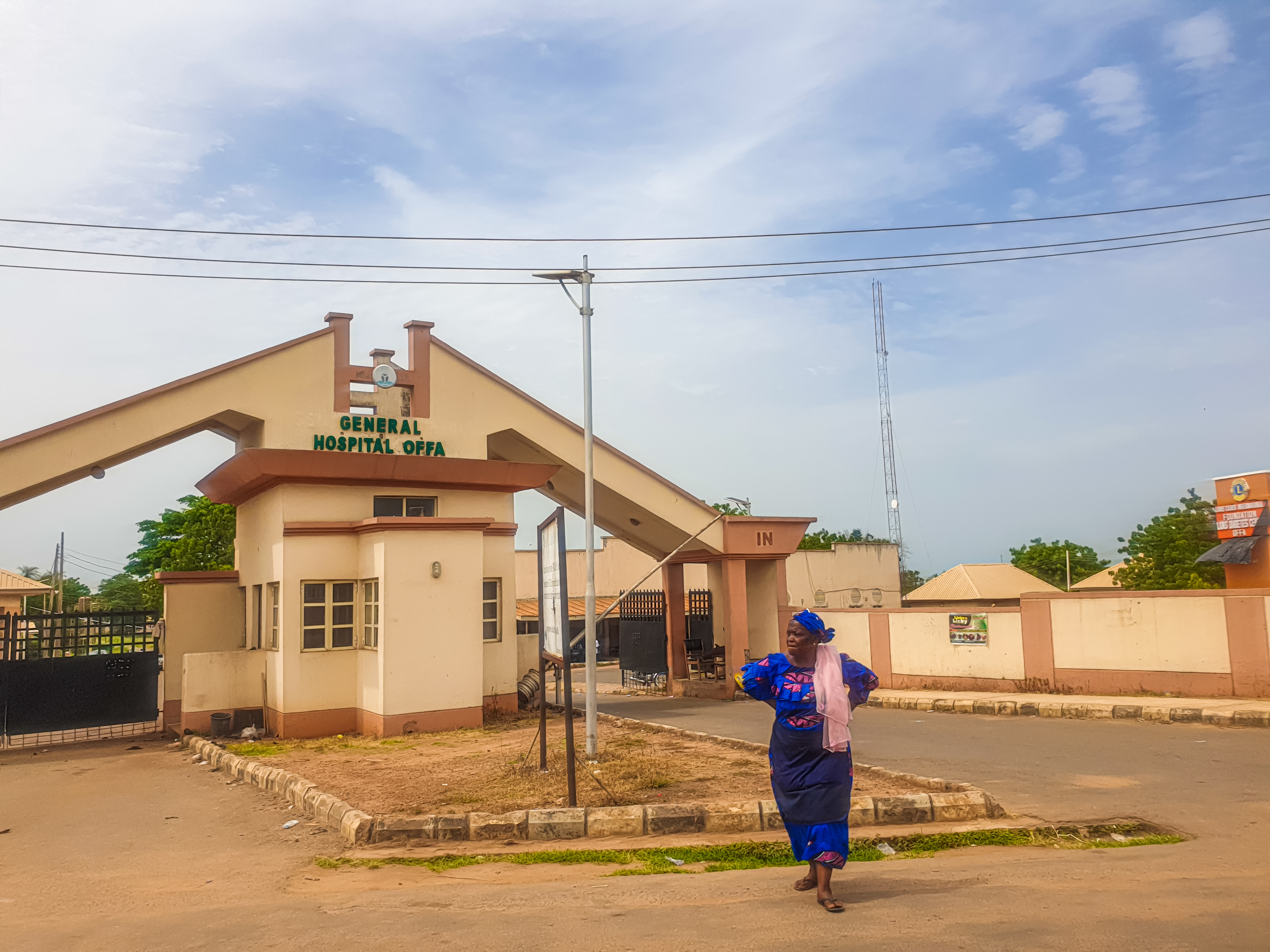

Geography
- Location: Offa, North Central, Kwara State, Nigeria

History
- Former name: General Hospital Offa
- Opened: January 1, 1946

Links
- Lists: Hospitals in Nigeria

Offa Specialist Hospital, also known as General Hospital Offa, is a public hospital in Offa, Kwara, Nigeria. It was established in 1946, and operates on a 24 hour basis.

== Description ==
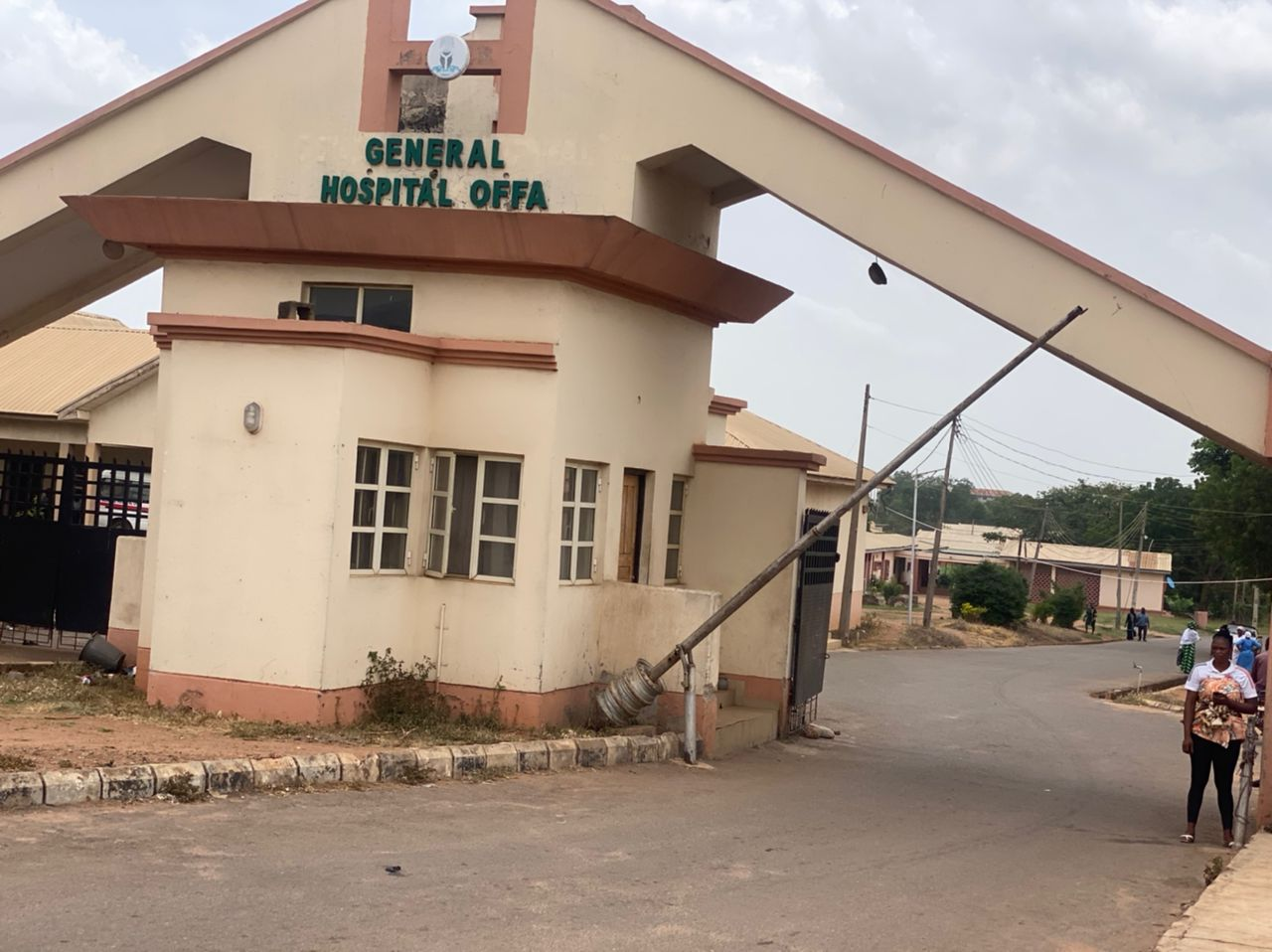
General Hospital Offa

The Offa General Hospital was licensed by the Federal Ministry of Health with facilities Code 23/15/1/3/2/0001 as a Secondary Public Health Care Center.

== Facilities and units ==
There are many units at the hospital, including accident and emergency units which were donated by Offa Metropolitan Club on 3 October 2020.

== Renovation ==
The hospital was renovated on 10 June 2014 under the administration of Abdulfatah Ahmed, the Governor of Kwara State. The renovation was described as a bold step of transformation of the state to economic hub with qualitative healthcare for an increasing population by the former Head of State Abdulsalami Abubakar.
