= Summit University, Offa =

Nigerian Private University Founded by Ansarudeen Society Of Nigeria

Coordinates: 8°08′43″N 4°42′01″E

- Type: Private
- Established: 2015
- Vice-Chancellor: Professor Abiodun Musa Aibinu
- Location: Offa, Kwara State, Nigeria
- Campus: Urban
- Website: https://summituniversity.edu.ng/

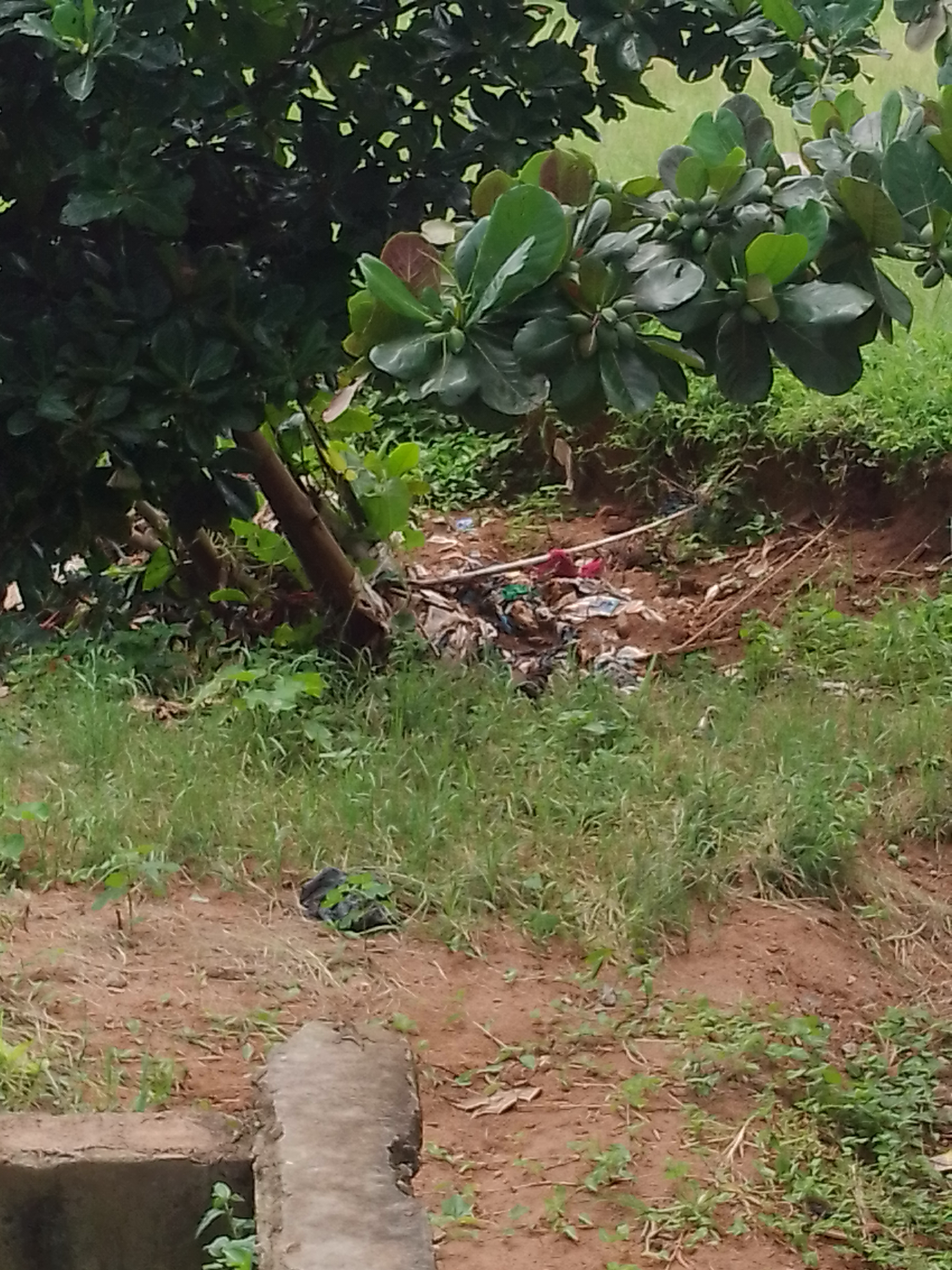
Land degradation caused by gully erosion at the Summit University

Summit University, Offa is a privately owned university founded in 2015 and located in Offa, Nigeria. It is one of the few private Universities located in Kwara, North central Nigeria.

The University is owned and established by the Ansar-Ud-Deen Society of Nigeria, a Muslim organization established for the purpose of educational development of Muslims and Muslim society in Nigeria. The institution was established together with nine others private universities in Nigeria in 2015.

== Organisation and Administration ==
=== College of Natural & Applied Sciences (CONAS) ===
- Biological sciences
- Chemical science
- Computer science

==== College of management and social sciences (COMAS) ====
- Mass Communication
- Political Science
- Economics
- Management & Accounting

===== COHAS =====
- English and Literary studies
- Arabic and Islamic studies

== Academic Profile ==
=== Scholarship ===
The university offers ranges of scholarships the likes of General Sawyer Scholarship

=== Libraries ===
==== Rankings and reputation ====
Summit University Offa is the top-ranked university in Offa, according to the EduRank.org website. In 2021 it ranked 13137 out of 14131 internationally, 891 out of 1104 in Africa, and 119 out of 157 in Nigeria.

== Academic Division ==
The institution began operation fully in November 2016 with 500 students

== Vice Chancellor ==
The founding Vice-chancellor of Summit University, Offa is Professor Hussein Oloyede. The Vice-Chancellor has assured the public during the opening of the institution that the institution would be one of the cheapest private University in Nigeria. The Vice-Chancellor together with Vice Chancellors of other private universities had pleaded with the Federal Government to allow private universities to also benefit from the TETFund (Tertiary Education Trust Fund) projects, so as to enable them to survive and continue to provide quality education to everyone.

Professor Abiodun Musa Aibinu is now the second Vice-Chancellor of the institution. His appointment took effect from April 2022 till date.

=== List Of Vice-Chancellors ===
1. Professor Hussein Oloyede (2015–2022)
2. Professor Abiodun Musa Aibinu (2022- date)
