= Offa, Nigeria =

Town in Kwara State, Nigeria

Offa Olalomi
- City and LGA
- Interactive map of Offa
- Location in Nigeria
- Coordinates: 8°9′N 4°43′E
- Country: Nigeria
- State: Kwara State
- LGA(s): Offa

Population (2006)
  - Total: 88,975
- Time zone: UTC+1 (WAT)
- Postal code: 250101
- National language: Yorùbá

Offa is a city and local government area in Kwara State of Nigeria, with a population of about 166,112 inhabitants. The town is noted for its weaving and dyeing trade, using vegetable dyes made from locally grown indigo and other plants. Offa is also renowned for Aso Oke textile weaving and pottery craft, which provide income for many families. Offa is well known for the cultivation of sweet potatoes and maize which also formed part of the favourite staple foods for the indigenes in the town. Cattle, goats and sheep are also raised there. The main religions practiced in the town are Islam, Christianity and traditional religions.

The ancient tradition for which the town is known for is wrestling and locally known as Ìjàkadì. Offatedo in Osun state, Iyana Offa in Oyo State, Offa in Côte d'Ivoire were established by the people of Offa.

Offa is centrally located. There is a big market in the town centre, known as Owode Market, which serves both the members of the community and its neighboring towns.

== History ==
Oba Okunoye reigned for five years before he died at war. His successor, Oba Adegboye, fought for four years before leaving town. Balogun Agidiako, who was appointed by Okunoye, became an instrument of treachery to the Offa people, leading to the Jalumi War. Oba Okunoye requested assistance from Ibadan, but died in 1882 before the war ended. Oba Adegboye succeeded him and continued the war for another five years.

Oba Adegboye of Offa ruled for 25 years, including the years he spent in Offatedo. Emir Monmon and Sule pleaded with him to return home, but the offer was rejected. Captain Bower approached Oba Adegboye and he reconsidered and returned home. When he arrived in Offa, he found Otakogbaiye or Arookan on the throne, so he had to leave and settle in Okoku for a year. but after continuous pleas, he reconsidered and returned home, with the promise from Ilorin that Offa people would no longer be disturbed.

== Institutions ==
=== Traditional institutions ===
The supreme traditional ruler (king) of the town is the Olofa who is assisted by five High Chiefs namely Essa, Ojomu, Sawo, Asalofa and Balogun.

There are two hundred and five thousand traditional households. Since the founding of the town in the late 14th century, twenty four Kings (Olofas) have ruled.

=== Offa Descendants Union ===
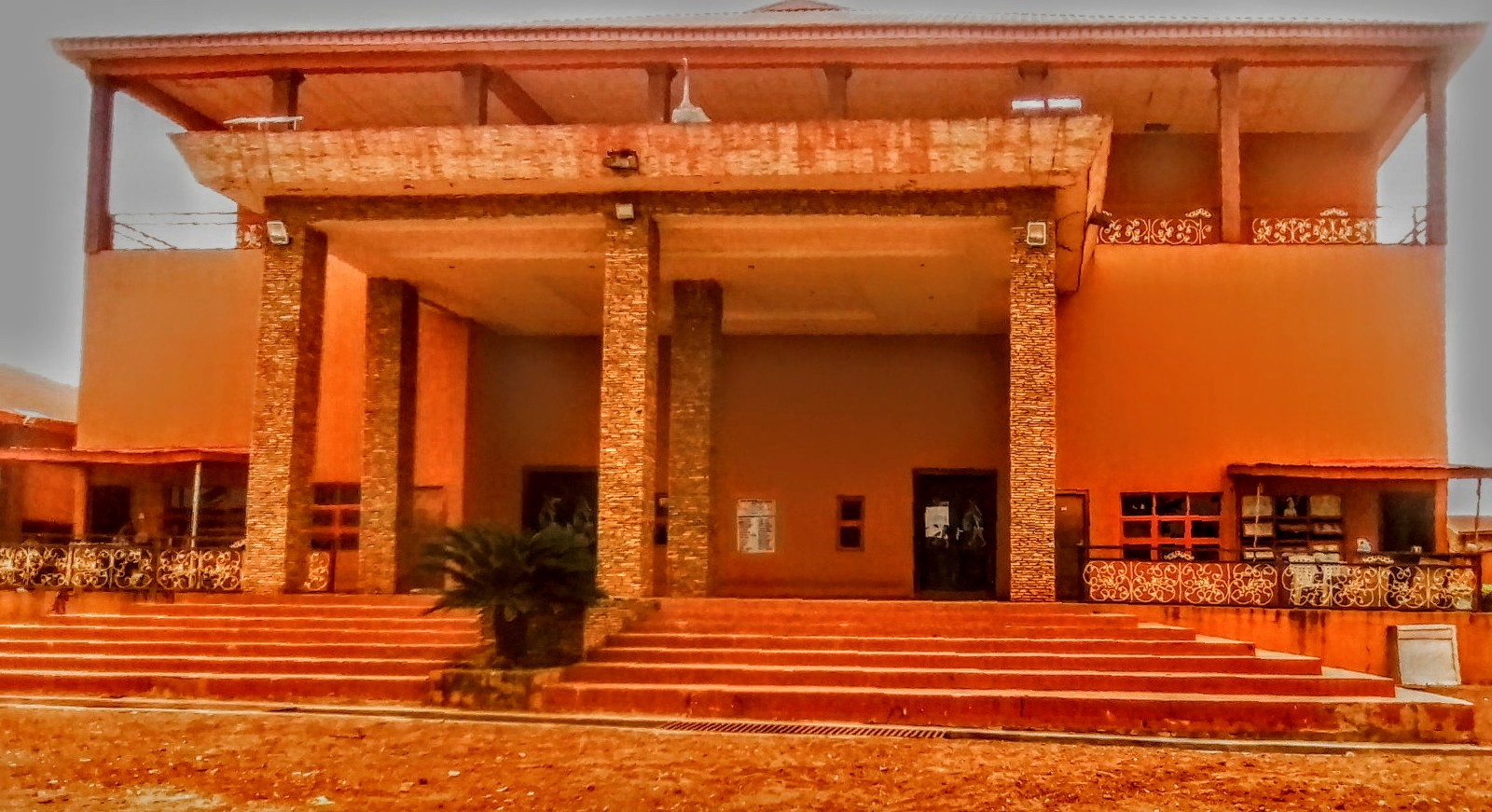
Offa Descendants Union entrance

The umbrella of the socio-cultural organisation in Offa is Offa Descendants Union, which was founded in Lagos, Nigeria by Offa indigenes on 13 October 1935. All other socio-cultural groups in the town are affiliates of ODU. The union has branches in all states of Nigeria and abroad. It has been involved in development efforts like the establishment of secondary schools, encouragement of investors, medical outreaches, supporting artisans, and other professional bodies.

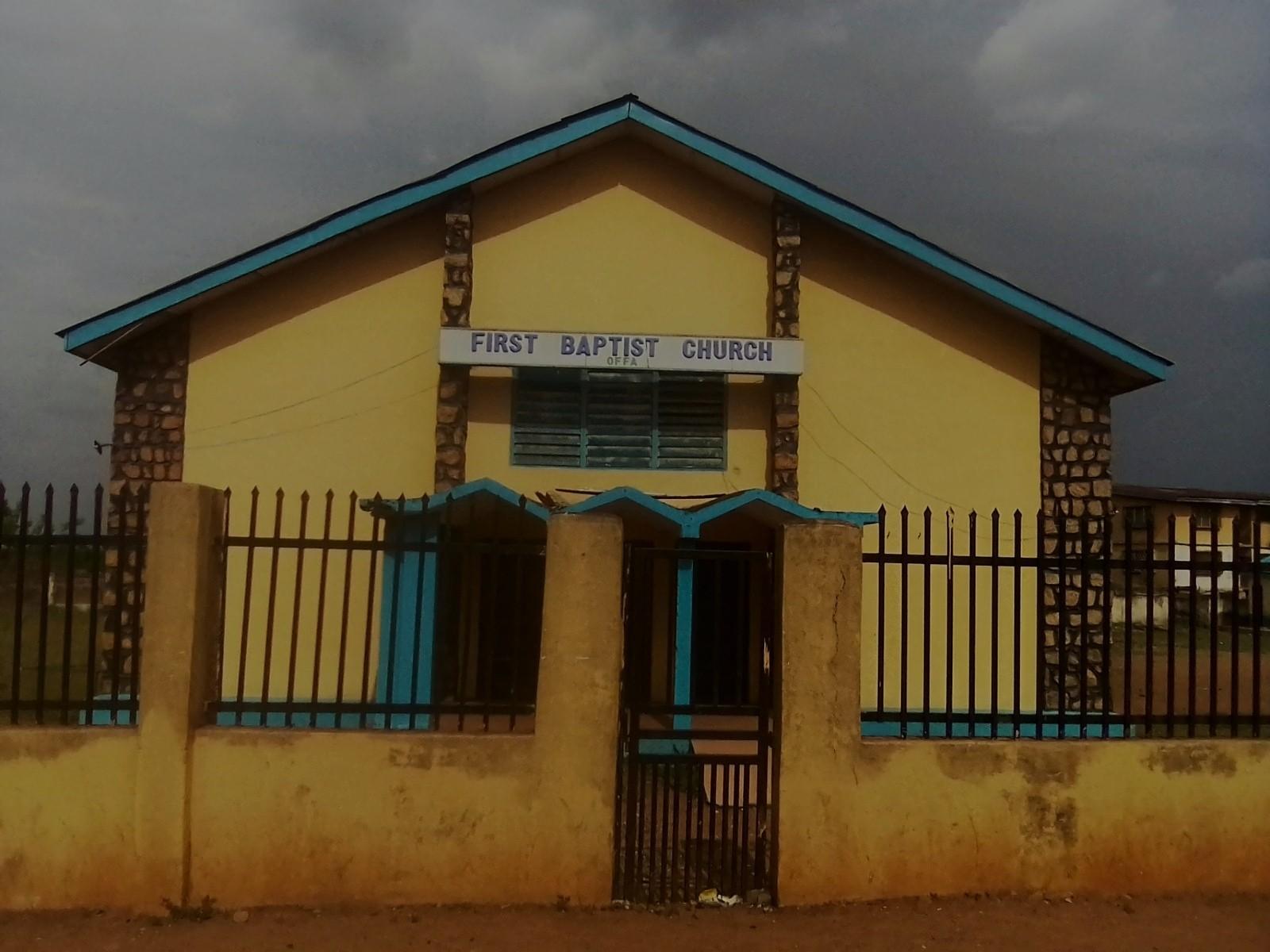
First Baptist Church Offa

=== Educational institutions ===
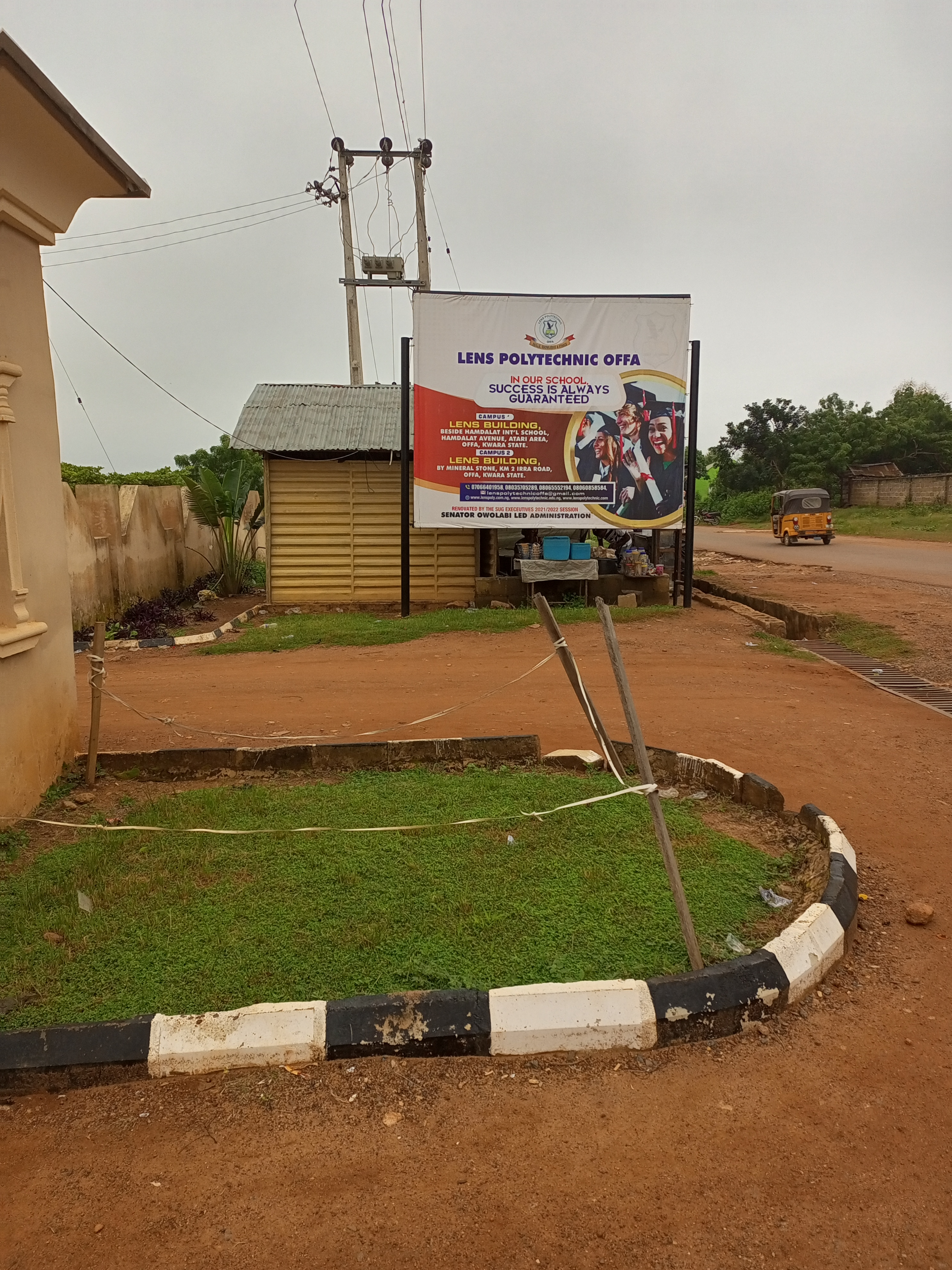
Lens Polytechnic, Offa

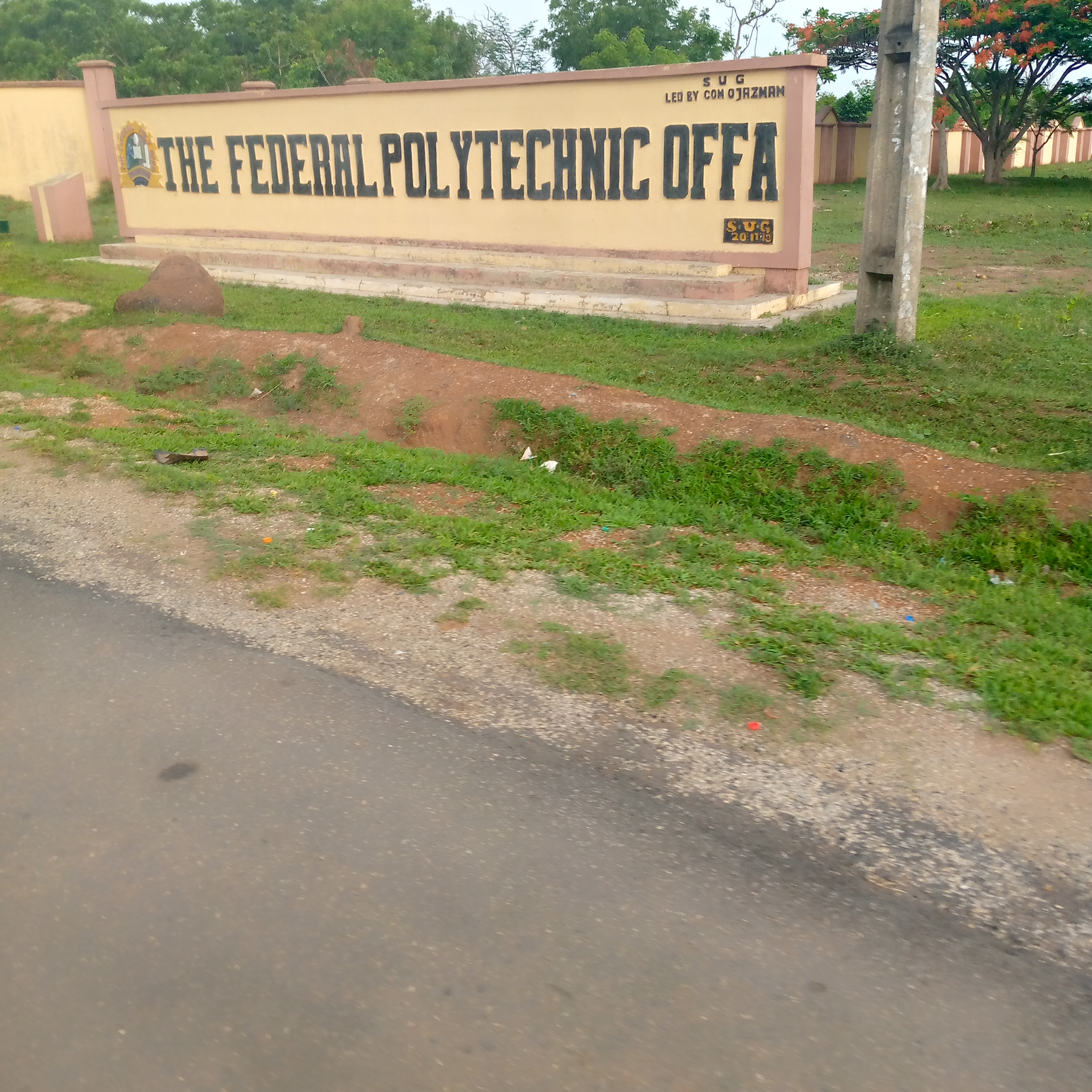
Federal Polytechnic, Offa permanent site

Offa indigenes are educated and the town has over one hundred professors in varied academic fields with the Ijaiya family having 10 professors. There are primary schools, secondary schools, three polytechnics, and three universities. The first primary school is St. Mark's (Anglican) Primary School and was established in the year 1912 by the Church Missionary Society and Offa Grammar School which is the first community secondary school in defunct Northern Nigeria established in 1943. The Federal Polytechnic, Offa was established in 1992. Other tertiary institutions include Kwara State College of Health Technology, Offa which was also established earlier in 1976; The Navy School of Health Sciences, Pan Africa College of Education, University of Offa (UNIOFFA) and National Open University of Nigeria (NOUN) Offa Study Centre, Lens Polytechnic, Offa Graceland Polytechnic, Offa and Summit University (the University of Ansarudeen Society of Nigeria).*Nigerian Navy College of Health Sciences, Offa - Established in 1984 as NN Medical Staff Training School. Relocated to Offa in 2004. Trains middle level medical staff.|

=== Secondary school and colleges ===
- Ansaruddeen college, Offa
- Nawarudeen Secondary school Offa
- Fountain Height college, Offa
- Government junior secondary school, Offa
- Adeola Model school, offa
- Iyeru grammar School Offa kwara State
- Offa Grammar School Offa Kwara State
- Offa community secondary school Offa kwara State
- Olalomi College Offa Kwara State

== Compound ==
- balogun
- Balogun ojoku
- Oga-nla
- Dada
- odo-ogofa
- Awopa
- Alabata
- adesina
- essa ward
- Olowa

== Hotels and reservation areas ==
- The Avalon Hotel
- Adlag Hotels
- Offa central hotel
- Awrab Suites Limited

=== Healthcare ===
There are different categories of hospital in Offa, both public (owned by the state government) and private (hospital owned by either community, associations or individuals).

- Offa Specialist Hospital (General Hospital Offa)
- Offa Medical Centre
- Lamodi Basic Health Centre
- Abogunugun Basic Health Centre

== Commerce ==
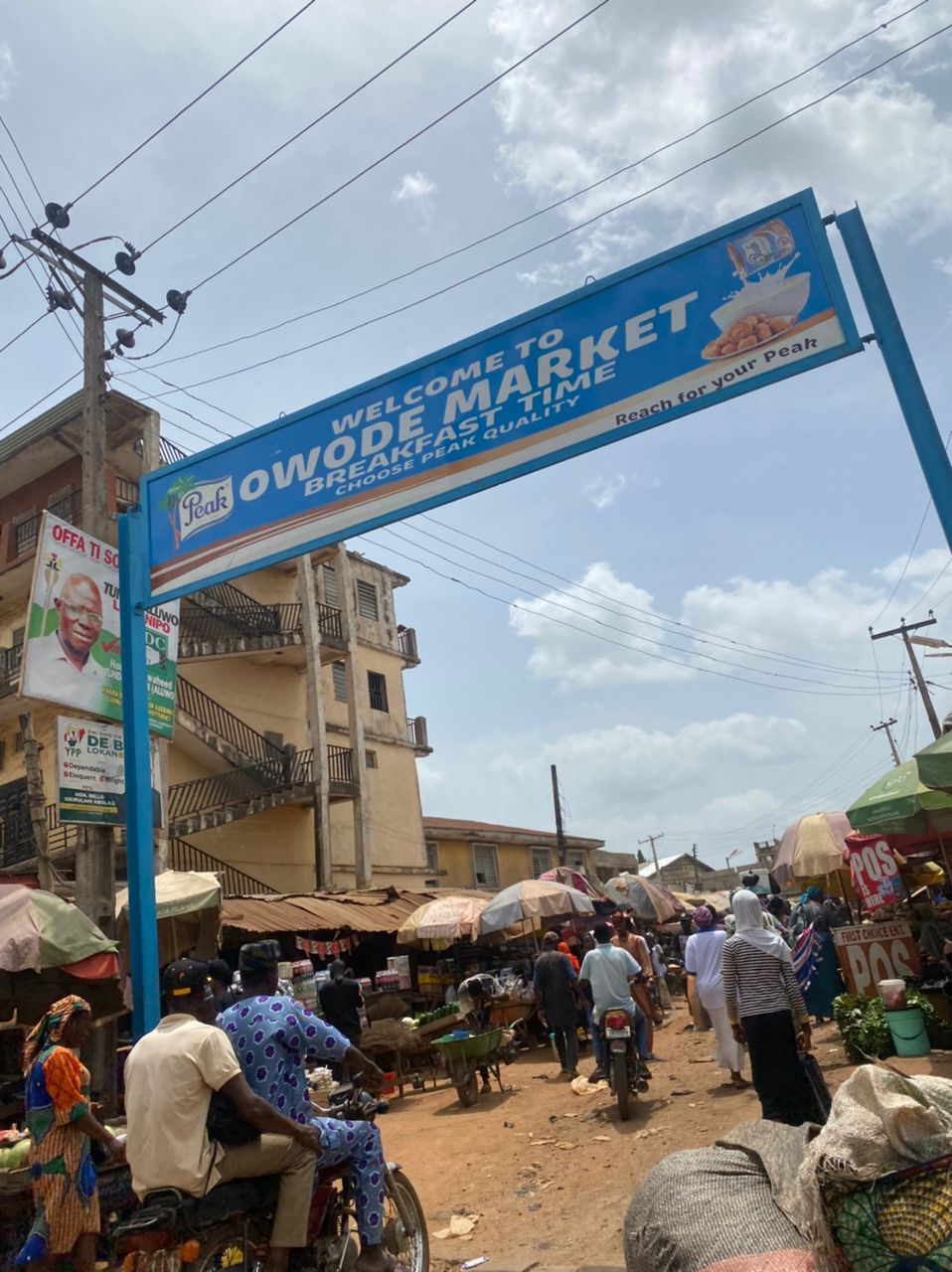
Owode market sign board

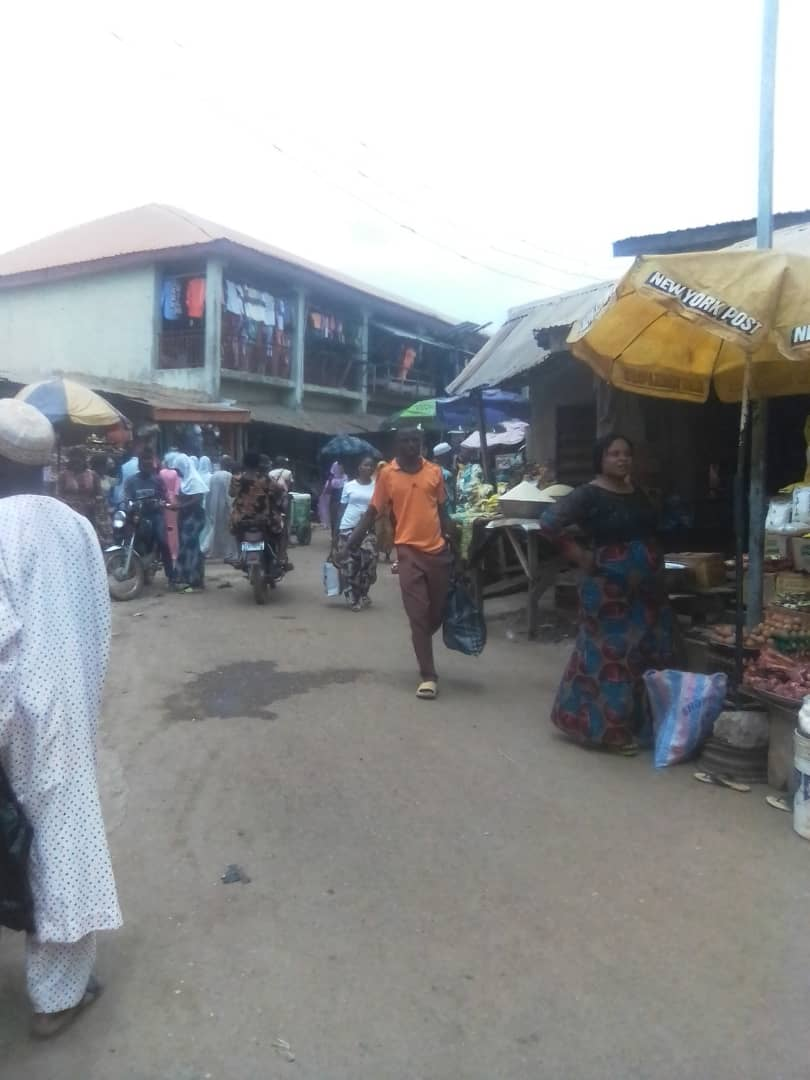
Image of owode market entrance

Owode Market in Offa started over 40 years ago, it opens every five days. It is a key driver of economic development for the neighborhood as well as the nearby towns and villages of Ijagbo, Erin-ile, Ojoku, Ikotun, Igosun, Ilemona, Irra, Inisha, and others.

On 5 April 2018, The Offa robbery occurred and claimed the lives of 18 people, including nine police officers and eight civilians, Owode Market was also a victim of this robbery. Offa Descendants Union, the community's leading social and cultural group before receiving support from the state government, stepped in to help market customers, opening the way for the construction of the Owode Ultra Modern Market, which cost millions of Naira. This included the market being rebuilt and renovated with the help of other well-wishers and donors from the neighborhood to match the national standards. The Owode market has changed significantly since then.

== Cultural ceremonies ==
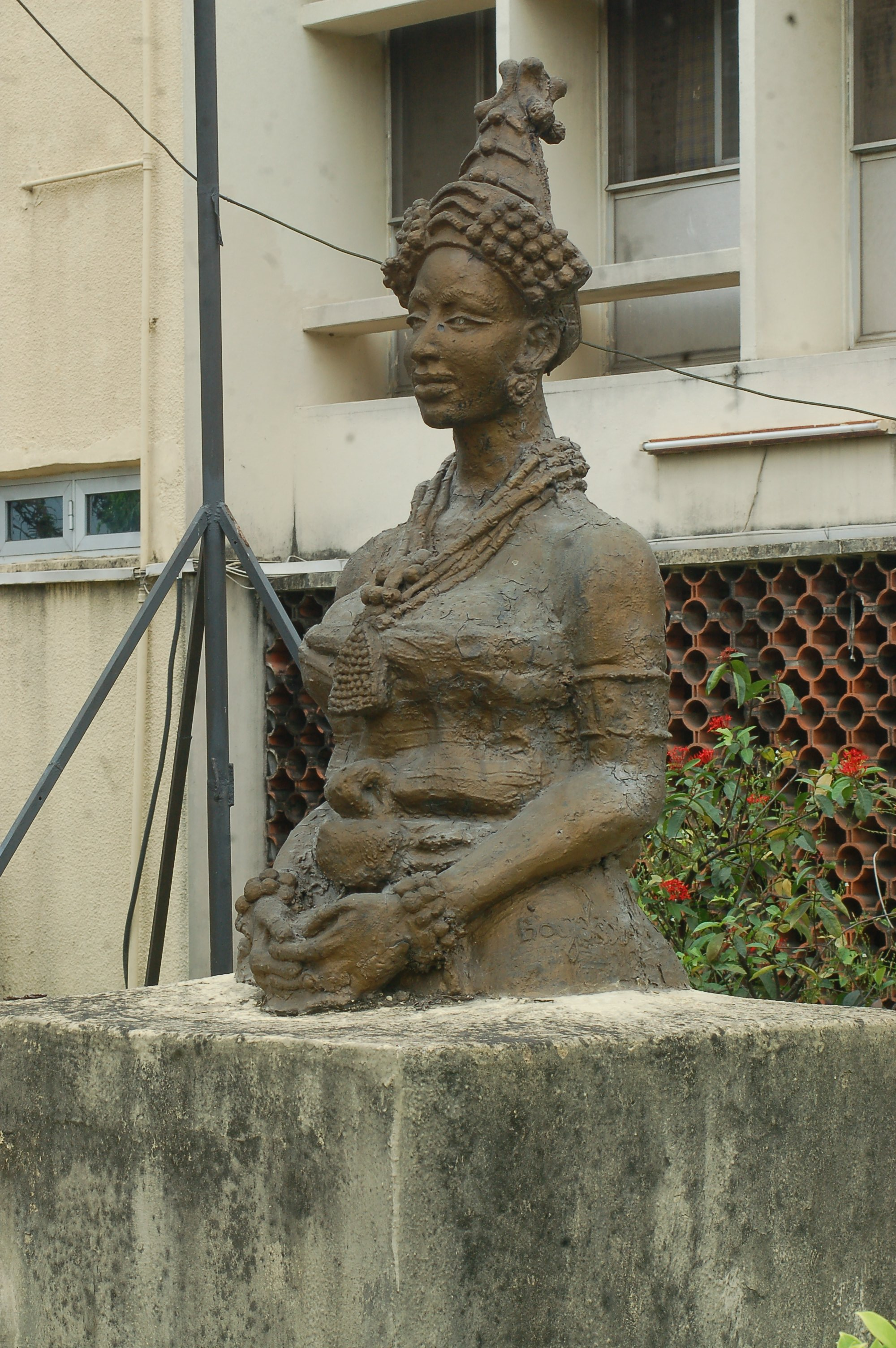
Queen Moremi Statue

"Offa" means arrow in the Yoruba language, and the founder of the town was known as "Olofagangan" the warrior with a sharp arrow. Offa is the cultural headquarters of the Ibolo people, which was regarded as an integral part of the old Oyo Empire. The Ibolos are also found in the present Osun State. The major traditional ceremony is 'Onimoka', which is an annual event to celebrate the memory of Queen Moremi an Offa indigene who saved the Ile-Ife kingdom from invaders. During the ceremony, wrestling contests are held in which the traditional Chiefs including the Olofa will engage in mock wrestling contests (Ijakadi). According to the Olofa during the eighth edition of the Ijakadi Festival in December 2019, the festival demonstrates Offa people's "love for equity, justice, and fairness as well as the resilience and unity of the community".

=== Moremi Ajasoro ===
Queen Moremi, a princess in Yoruba folklore, was a figure of high significance in the history of the Yoruba peoples. She was a member-by-marriage of the royal family of Emperor Oduduwa and was the wife of King Oranmiyan of Ife. She was a brave and beautiful woman who offered anything she had to give in sacrifice to the spirit of the river Esimirin to discover the strength of her nation's enemies. She was taken as booty to the Igbo king and soon won the trust and affection of the king and people in Igbo land. The Igbo people of Ife were freed from the terrors of these previously invincible warriors when she escaped and returned to her first husband, King Oranmiyan of Ife.

She sacrificed her only son Oluorogbo to fulfill her promise to Esimirin and was held in the highest esteem of any women in the Kingdom. The Edi Festival was started to celebrate her sacrifice, and public places are named after her in contemporary Nigeria.

== Population ==
The provincial figure for the population of Offa Local Government Area by the National population Commission (Federal Republic of Nigeria Official Gazette No. 24 of May 2007 Government Notice) is 46,266 males and 43,428 females, altogether 89,674.

== Climate ==
The rainy season in Offa is warm, oppressive and cloudy, whereas the dry season is warm, muggy, and partially cloudy. The average annual temperature ranges from 17 to 33 degrees Celsius (63 to 92 degrees Fahrenheit), with lows and highs of 14 and 36 degrees Celsius (57 and 97 degrees Fahrenheit) being extremely rare. From 23 January to 4 April, the hot season, with an average daily high temperature above 90 °F, lasts for 2.4 months. With an average high of 91 °F and low of 72 °F, March is the hottest month of the year in Offa. The 3.8-month chilly season, which runs from 19 June to 11 October, has an average daily maximum temperature of less than 83 °F. With an average low of 69 °F and a high of 81 °F, August is the coldest month of the year in Offa.

== Transportation ==
Offa's transportation system allows easy movement of products and services across Offa and its environs, using the roads such as (Okada, Koropé, keke NAPEP and Taxi) and Rail such as train for transit modes.

Offa railway station was constructed by the British colonial government in 1896 with an interstate train station. Offa serves as the beginning point for train travel to Lagos and other regions of the nation as one of the major stations along the Lagos-Ibadan-Ilorin rail route. In contrast to Ibadan terminus, which the general people referred to as a district, Offa terminus was constructed as the first terminal following Ibadan. Subsequently, Offa served as the administrative center for Oshogbo and Ilorin, both of which are currently state capitals in Nigeria. Offa attracted a lot of experts from around the globe due to its administrative position in control of Osogbo, Inisha, Okuku, Erin-Ile, Ijagbo and Ilorin.

== Sports ==
Offa offers a variety of sports, including football, volleyball, boxing, wrestling, taekwondo, basketball, Boards games such as Chess, Scrabble, Draft and many others.

== Riots with Erin-Ile ==
Offa have been in several conflicts with neighbouring town Erin-Ile. Despite located in different local government areas, disputes over land have continued for several years since 1973 when the Supreme Court first ruled on the issue.

In 2013, the federal polytechnic was closed down due to the riots with the Masjid Noor and the descendant union vandalised. Erin-Ile was under attack as well, which resulted in people living at the border relocating.

== List of past Olofas ==
1. Olalomi (The Olofa himself) 1397 – 1448 (51 Years) hunter Prince of oranyan Descendants Ife to Oyo

2. Olutide 1448 – 1491 (43 years) Warred with Nupes. Settled at Offa Esun

3. Olugbensinde 1491 – 1526 (35 years) Moved to Offa – Igbolotu

4. Oluwole 1526 – 1567 (41 years) Wars with Nupes

5. Okunmolu 1567 – 1624 (57 years) Settle on present site – Offa Igboro

6. Olusanle 1624 – 1679 (55 years) Assisted Alafin to expand Olusanmi 1679 – 1726 (47 years)

7. Olugbense 1726 – 1786 (60 years) Constructed roads in Offa township reported Offa and Erinle Quarrel to Alafin

8. Bamgbola Aremu Agbojojoye 1789 – 1800 (11 years) peaceful reign

9. Amodu Agaka 1800 – 1803 (3 years) Fulani wars with Oyo affected Offa

10. Olumorin Anilelerin 1803 -1832 (29 years) Nupes invaded Offa, moved to Ido-Osun, later moved to Iseyin

11. Alade Alebiosu 1832 – 1844 (12 years) Supreme overlord of Ibolo kingdom

12. Ariyi Omolaoye 1844 -1850 (6 years)

13. Morounhunfolu Okunoye 1850 – 1882 (32 years) With Ilorin warning Jalumi war 14. Atoloye Adegboye 1882 – 1886 (4 years) Fight to Ido-Osun offa

15. Arokansorisa Otaogbaiye(2nd Reign) 1886 – 1902 (16 years) Reigned when Adegboye was in Ido-Osun

16. Atoloye Adegboye (2nd reign) 1902 – 1906 (4 years) Returned to Offa from Ido-Osun offa railway line reached Offa

17. Oyeniran Ariwajoye (I) 1906 – 1917 (11 years) Train passed Offa, christian come to Offa. 1st primary school CMS opened Ibolo district stationed in Offa station office withdraw. Offa became 2nd class chief

18. Arojojoye Adeboye 1917 -1920 (3 years) Offa Erin-Ile road constructed.

19. Abidoye 1920 – 1926 (6 years) Very much liked

20. Esuwoye 1926 – 1936 (10 years) Roofed palace with iron sheets

21. Wuraola Isioye 1936 – 1957 (21 years) Rebuilt Onimoka shrine Adeboye, returned Central Mosque bult, O. D. U also founded on Oct. 13th,135, Went on exile to Ogbomosho, General Hospital built

22. Mustapha Keji 1959 – 1969 (10 years) Pipe-borne water & electricity installed.Offa became Administrative Headquarter of Oyun Local Government, St. Clear's Girls Grammar School founded. Wuraola Isioye came back to Offa as a citizen

23. Mustapha Olawore Olanipekun Ariwajoye (II) 1970 – 2010 Staff of Office returned to Offa. Palace rebuilt to modern structure. Industries and various developments are being established. Upgraded to 1st class Oba, Federal Polytechnic Offa established, Navy Academy was established.

24. Mufutau Gbadamosi Esuwoye 2010 - current

== List of past Offa local government chairmen ==
- Alh Hassan Oyeleke 1991-1993
- Suleiman Olatunji Omituntun 2024 till date.

== Bibliography ==
- Olafimihan, James Bukoye: Iwe Itan Offa (The Book of the History of Offa).
