= Bello (surname) =

Origin
- Meaning: derived from Late Latin bellus meaning handsome/beautiful derived from Fulfulde ballo meaning helper
- Region of origin: Italy, Spain, West Africa

Other names
- Variant forms: Abello, Ballo, Vello, Vela

Bello is an Italian, Spanish surname from bello "handsome/beautiful" (Late Latin bellus), hence a nickname for a handsome man. In medieval Italy, the word was also applied as a personal name, which also gave rise to the surname.

Among the Fula people of West Africa, the name means 'helper', derived from the Fulfulde word ballo. The name was also initially a personal name, which later became a surname.

Notable people with the surname include:

- Ada Bello (1933–2023), American LGBT activist and researcher
- Ahmadu Bello (1910 –1966), Premier of Northern Nigeria from 1954 to 1966
- Alberto Bello (1897–1963), Argentine actor
- Alfred Bello, witness in trial of Rubin Carter
- Andrés Bello (1781–1865), Venezuelan poet, lawmaker, philosopher, and educator
- Ángel Bello (1951–2013), Argentine archer
- Antoine Bello (born 1970), French-American writer
- B. J. Bello (born 1994), American football player
- Babatounde Bello (born 1989), Beninese footballer
- Basim Bello (1963–2024), Iraqi Assyrian politician
- Brayan Bello (born 1999), Dominican baseball player
- Carolina Bello (born 1983), Uruguayan writer
- Eduardo Bello (born 1995), Argentine rugby union footballer
- Emilio Bello (1868–1941), Chilean lawyer, diplomat and politician
- Fernando Bello (disambiguation), several people
- Frank Bello (born 1965), American bass guitar player
- Henry Bello, shooter in Bronx Lebanon Hospital attack
- Joaquín Edwards Bello (1887–1968), Chilean writer
- John Bello (born 1946), American entrepreneur
- José Bello (1904–2008), Spanish intellectual and writer
- Juan Carlos Bello (born 1949), Peruvian swimmer
- Léa Bello (born 1987), French videographer, journalist, doctor of geophysics
- Louie Bello, American musician
- Marco Bello (c. 1470 – 1523), Italian painter
- Maria Bello (born 1967), American actress
- Ramón Medina Bello (born 1966), Argentine football player
- Walden Bello (born 1945), Filipino academic and political analyst
- Xuan Bello (1965–2025), Spanish poet, writer, essayist, and translator

== Other ==
- Doctor Bello, a 2013 Nigerian film

== See also ==
- Bello (given name)
- Di Bello
