= Bullo =

Bullo is a surname. Notable people with the surname include:

- Mirko Bullo (born 1959), Swiss football player
- Nicole Bullo (born 1987), Swiss ice hockey player

== See also ==
- Bello (surname)
