= Bello (given name) =

Bello is a masculine given name of West African origin. Notable people with the name include:

== Given name ==
- Bello of Carcassonne (755–810), French count
- Bello Bako Dambatta (born 1950), Nigerian chemist and university administrator
- Bello Dandago (1908–1977), Nigerian politician
- Bello FiGo (born 1992), Ghanaian-Italian YouTuber and singer
- Bello Jibrin Gada (born 1954), Nigerian politician
- Bello Muhammad Goronyo (born 1966), Nigerian lawyer and politician
- Bello Hayatu Gwarzo (born 1960), Nigerian politician
- Bello Kaoje (born 1972), Nigerian politician
- Bello Musa Kofarmata (1988–2022), Nigerian footballer
- Bello Bouba Maigari (born 1947), Cameroonian politician
- Bello Mandiya (1964–2026), Nigerian politician
- Bello Matawalle (born 1969), Nigerian politician
- Bello Nock (born 1968), American daredevil and circus performer
- Bello John Olarewaju (born 1960), Nigerian politician
- Bello Yinusa Oniboki (born 1968), Nigerian academic and politician
- Bello Razaq (born 1984), Nigerian footballer
- Bello Bala Shagari (born 1988), Nigerian activist and filmmaker
- Bello Shehu (born 1958), Nigerian academic and neurosurgeon
- Bello Hassan Shinkafi, Nigerian politician
- Bello Shugaba, Nigerian politician
- Bello Sisqo (born 1998), German-Nigerian singer, dancer, songwriter, and music director
- Bello Snyder (1912–1998), American basketball player
- Bello Suleiman (born 1952), Nigerian engineer and politician
- Bello Mohammed Tukur (born 1960), Nigerian politician
- Bello Turji (born 1994), Nigerian terrorist and bandit leader
- Bello Maitama Yusuf (1947–2023), Nigerian politician

== See also ==
- Bello (surname)
