= Di Bello =

Di Bello or DiBello is an Italian patronymic surname from the personal name Bello. Notable people with the surname include:

- Carla DiBello, American businesswoman, film producer, and columnist
- César Di Bello, Argentine actor
- Marco Di Bello (born 1981), Italian football referee
- Rossana Di Bello (1956–2021), Italian politician

== See also ==
- Bello (surname)
- Di Bella
