= Paraguay–United States relations =

- Paraguay: United States

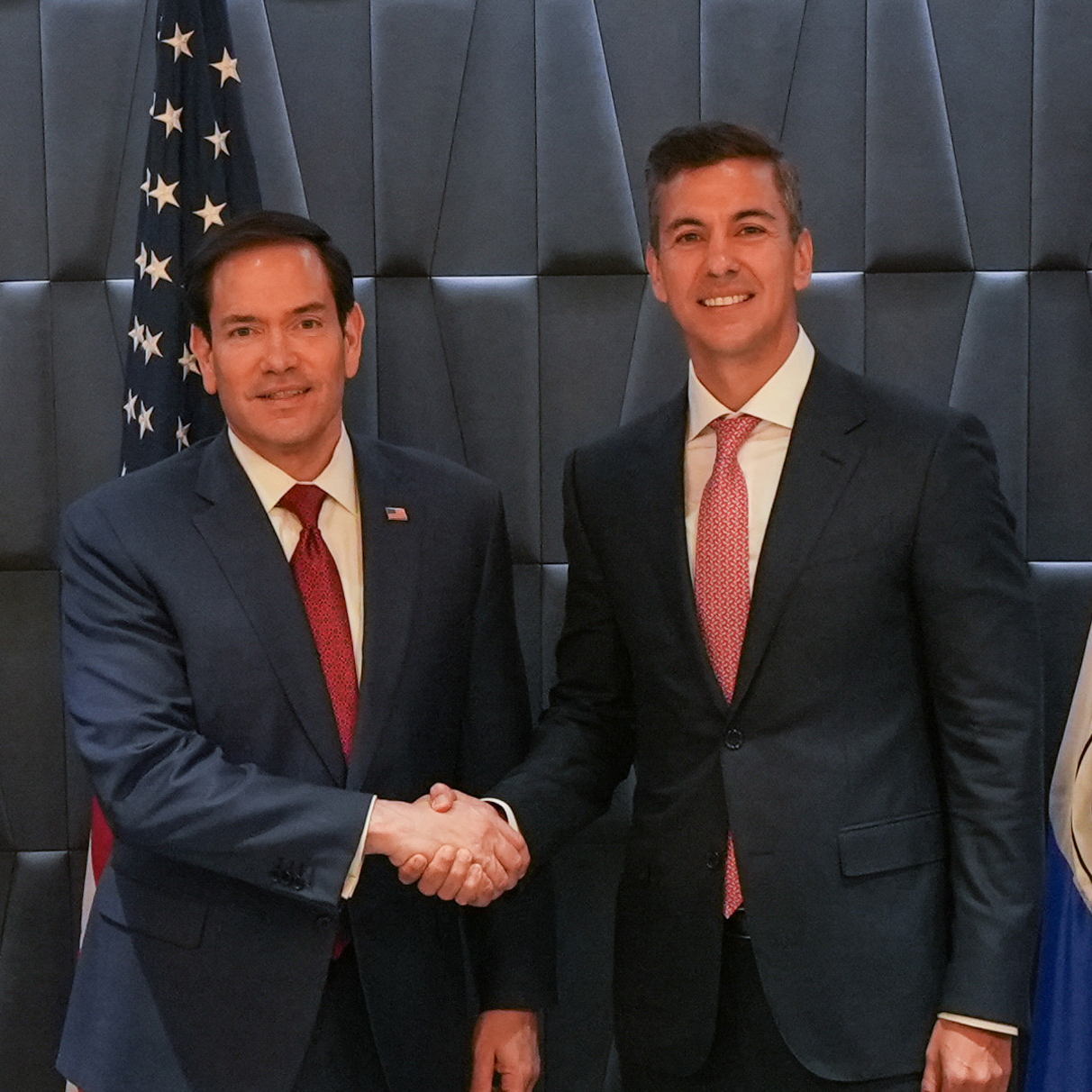
United States Secretary of State Marco Rubio meets Santiago Peña, then President of Paraguay, during the 2026 FIFA World Cup in Seattle.

Paraguay and the United States bilateral diplomacy began amid regional tensions and an 1855 episode of hostility that claimed one life. The encounter led to the establishment of formal ties and set the tone for more than two centuries of relations that have expanded into cooperation on issues of geopolitics, trade, economic development, and cultural exchange. The two nations maintain embassies in each other's capitals and generally enjoy friendly relations centered on democratic governance and regional stability.

According to Gallup’s Rating World Leaders 2024 survey, 42 percent of Paraguayans approve of U.S. leadership, while 28 percent disapprove and 30 percent express no opinion. The findings represent a 15-percentage-point drop in approval from the previous year. While the reason for this approval decrease is uncertain, intergovernmental tensions rose during the presidency of Joe Biden after the United States applied sanctions on Horacio Cartes, the billionaire leader of the ruling Colorado Party, who served as Paraguay's president from 2013 to 2018.

Paraguay formally requested the early departure of U.S. Ambassador Marc Ostfield in August 2024 following new sanctions on Cartes’s tobacco company, but Ostfield did not leave his post until the Biden–Donald Trump presidential transition. The Trump administration lifted sanctions on Cartes in October 2025, a move welcomed by Santiago Peña, who served as Paraguay's president from 2023 to 2026. In granting Cartes sanctions relief, the State Department said the sanctions were “no longer required to incentivize changes in behavior,” though accusations persist that Cartes has bribed legislators and exerted undue influence within Paraguay's government. Peña's administration described the measures as politically motivated and harmful to national industry, and said their suspension represented the end of U.S. "persecution."

Despite this détente, the ambassadorship has remained vacant for more than 20 months, about three and a half times the historical average for this office among previous U.S. administrations. In June 2026, Trump nominated Ohio agriculture businessman Paul Kalmbach as Ostfield's successor, but the United States Senate later adjourned until November ahead of the 2026 midterms, having taken no action on Kalmbach. During this time, Paraguay has dispatched two ambassadors to Washington, including incumbent Estefania Laterza de los Rios.

Contents

History • 19th century • 20th century • 21st century • Socioeconomic relations • Trade • Transportation • Cultural exchange • Resident diplomatic missions

== History ==
=== 19th century ===
Following its independence in 1811, Paraguay practiced strategic isolation from the outside world, maintaining little to no contact with the United States for nearly four decades. The U.S. recognized Paraguay’s independence on April 27, 1852.

Over the following century, Paraguay twice waged full-scale wars with neighboring states, amid which the United States participated in peace negotiations and post-war boundary settlements. Both world wars of the 20th century had limited impact on U.S.–Paraguay relations, but during the Cold War the United States expanded its involvement in South America to counter Soviet influence. Since that period, bilateral engagement has focused primarily on supporting free and fair elections, discouraging corruption, and strengthening economic cooperation.

==== The Water Witch incident ====
President Carlos Antonio López, first Paraguayan to hold that title, signed several treaties of friendship, commerce, and navigation with world powers in the 1850s. López mistrusted his Latin American neighbors and sought more distant foreign ties to strengthen Paraguay’s nascent economy and defenses. The U.S. engaged in a form of "gunboat diplomacy" in this early period: Paraguayan troops at Fort Itapirú, near the junction of the Paraguay and Paraná rivers, opened fire on the survey steamer Water Witch on February 1, 1855. The Water Witch had been dispatched from Buenos Aires to map potential trade routes in South America. López ordered the shelling out of fear that the vessel sailed under false pretenses to conduct espionage; he also sought to assert Paraguayan sovereignty.

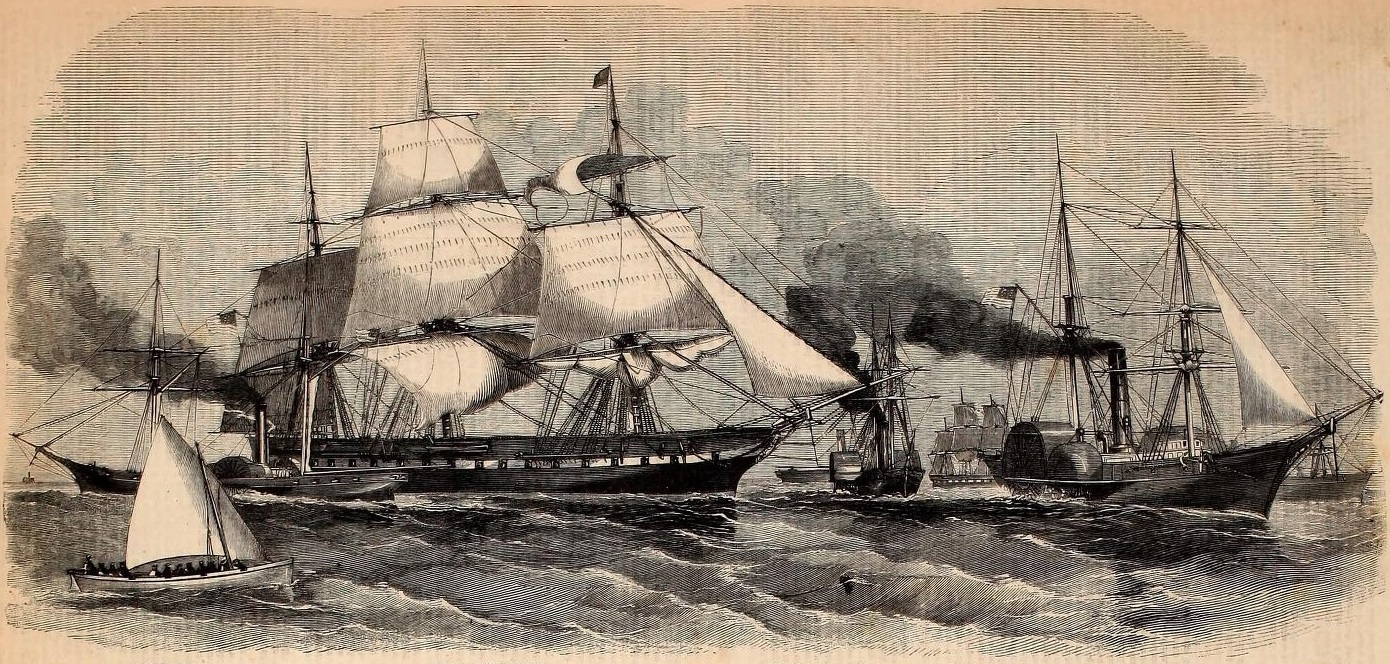
The Paraguay Squadron (Harper's Weekly, New York City, October 16, 1858).

Samuel Chaney, a Water Witch helmsman, died instantly after a direct hit by cannon fire. Commanding officer Thomas J. Page recorded no other casualties in his dispatch to Washington. President Franklin Pierce sent a note of protest to López but took no further action. James Buchanan succeeded as U.S. president in 1857 and, after extended preparations, ordered 19 ships carrying some 2,500 U.S. servicemen to sail to Asunción and demand accountability. Paraguay expressed conciliation after the force's arrival in January 1859. López's government paid an indemnity of $10,000 (about $395,000 in 2025) for Chaney's death as part of a new treaty of friendship, commerce, and navigation. The payment served as a mostly symbolic gesture, as the United States expended well over $2 million (more than $70 million in 2025) to fund the expedition.

Although the American Civil War curtailed U.S. diplomatic engagement in Latin America, President Abraham Lincoln dispatched Charles Ames Washburn to Paraguay in 1861 as U.S. commissioner; Washburn later served with the rank of minister resident. Francisco Solano López, who succeeded his father as Paraguay’s leader in 1862, expelled Washburn in 1868. While Washburn expressed sympathy for Paraguay’s position in its conflicts with neighboring states, López accused him of abusing diplomatic asylum by harboring dissidents at the U.S. mission. Martin T. McMahon arrived in 1869 as the second senior U.S. diplomat to reside in Paraguay.

==== South America's bloodiest conflict ====
The War of the Triple Alliance (1864–1870) against Brazil, Argentina, and Uruguay devastated Paraguay for generations. During his tenure as minister resident, McMahon urged for the U.S. to intervene in the War of the Triple Alliance, having witnessed firsthand the grievous harm it inflicted. By some estimates, as much as half of Paraguay’s prewar population — likely between 400,000 and 500,000 people — had died by the time Brazil, Argentina, and Uruguay ended their occupation in the mid-1870s.

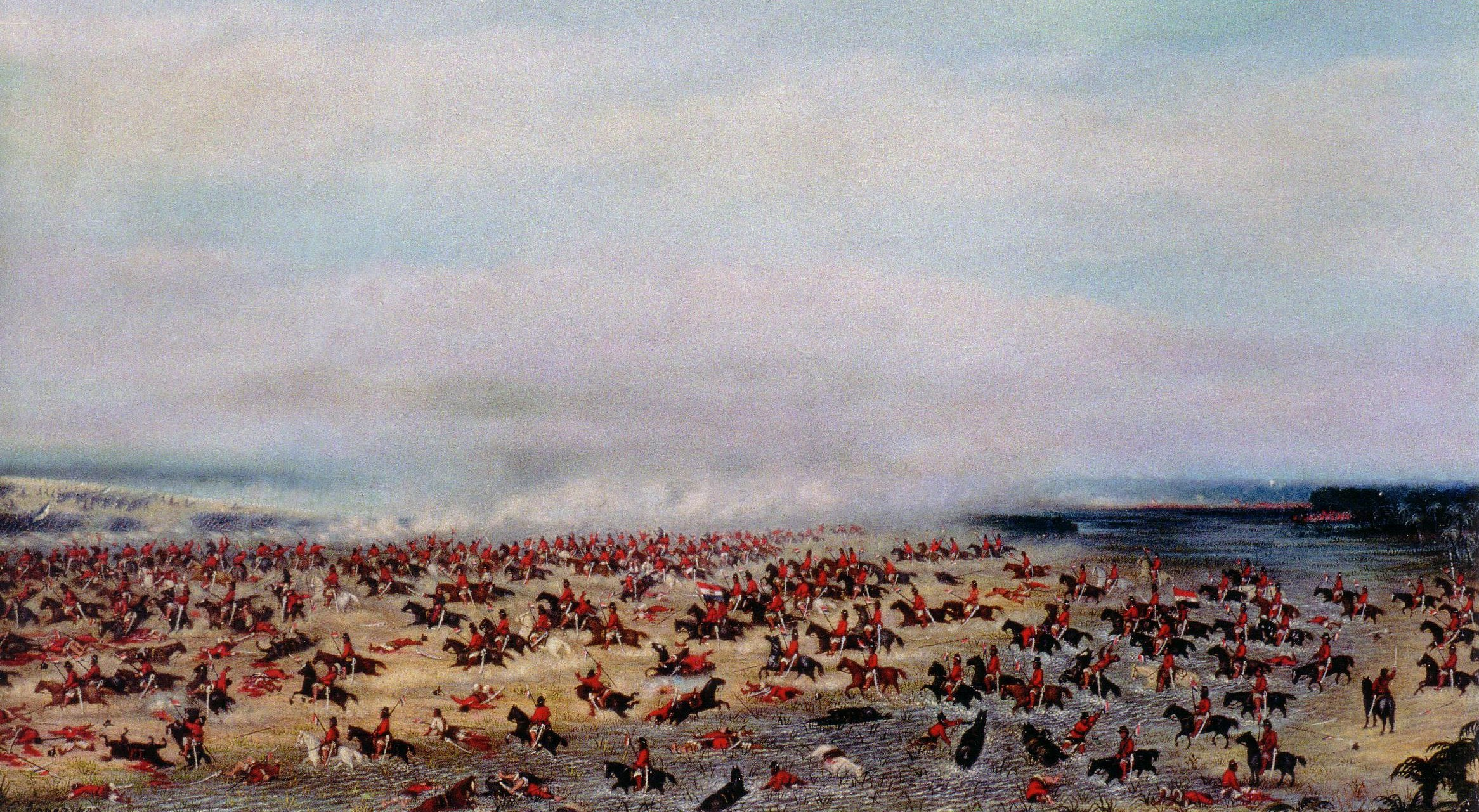
The Battle of Tuyutí (1866) inflicted thousands of casualties on both sides. The war dragged on four more years.

The United States regarded victorious Brazil and Emperor Pedro II with particular disfavor. Brazil retained slavery for decades after the U.S. abolished it, and anti-monarchism extant since the end of British rule in the U.S. remained popular. Pedro II also welcomed immigrants to Brazil who remained bitter over the Confederates’ defeat in the American Civil War, and who wished to continue enslaving people. Brazil sustained heavy casualties and expenditures to invade Paraguay, but finished the effort with a battle-hardened, professional army that challenged U.S. strategic ambitions in the Americas. McMahon described the war in Paraguay as an “extermination” by the allied powers and invoked the Monroe Doctrine as justification for the United States to help end the bloodshed and restrain imperial expansion in South America. Using his influence as a senior officer and veteran of the American Civil War, McMahon won sympathetic press coverage and informal hearings in Washington. Nevertheless, President Ulysses S. Grant declined to pursue any diplomatic, economic, or military measures in Paraguay’s favor, wary of foreign entanglements in the Reconstruction era.

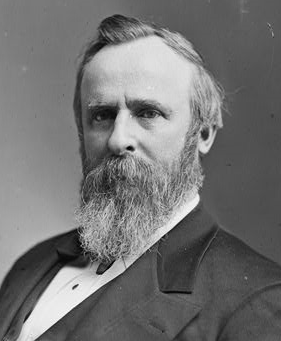
Rutherford B. Hayes earned Paraguayan naming honors and a national holiday for his decision in the 1878 border dispute with Argentina.

In the war’s aftermath, Paraguay and Argentina had ongoing border disputes. Both nations submitted the matter to arbitration by Rutherford B. Hayes, U.S. president from 1877 to 1881, who granted Paraguay most of the contested territory in 1878. Paraguay later named a city, an administrative region, and a national holiday in his honor; it observes November 12 as Día del Laudo Hayes, commemorating the award that preserved its sovereignty.

=== 20th century ===
After the war's conclusion, Paraguay received little international attention until the Chaco War with Bolivia (1932–1935). U.S. and European firms supplied arms to both sides. Populist politician Huey Long promoted Paraguay's cause on the floor of the U.S. Senate and derided Bolivia, shifting public perception of the war in the U.S. and in Latin America. A peace treaty in 1938 involving U.S. and other neutral diplomats awarded most of the Chaco region to Paraguay.

==== U.S. engages with dictators ====
Washington's influence in Paraguay expanded during World War II with economic and technical assistance. Seeking to counter Axis influence in South America, in 1942 the U.S. funded significant public health, agriculture and infrastructure projects in Paraguay for the first time. During the conflict, Washington liaised with Higinio Morínigo, a general who seized the Paraguayan presidency in 1940. Morínigo, having no ideological opposition to fascism, severed ties with Nazi Germany and its allies in 1942 under pressure from the United States and in pursuit of economic aid. For the same reasons, he declared war on the Axis in February 1945. With the war in Europe nearly over by that time, Paraguayan forces never saw combat abroad. Beyond the country’s limited resources and landlocked geography, Paraguayans expressed reluctance to enter another conflict after suffering more than 50,000 killed and wounded in the Chaco War.

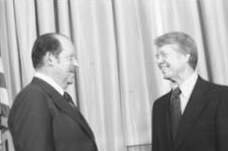
Paraguayan dictator Alfredo Stroessner alongside Jimmy Carter in 1977. Stroessner maintained close ties with the U.S. until the end of the Cold War.

In the post-war period, Paraguay experienced several years of political instability. Morínigo lost power and fled to exile in Argentina in 1948, and several men served as president for brief periods before Alfredo Stroessner established a new dictatorship in 1954. During his 35-year rule, the United States supported anti-communist repression and maintained close security and economic ties. Between 1962 and 1989, the United States provided more than $150 million in direct economic and military assistance to the Stroessner regime. The United States indirectly supported the Itaipu Dam, inaugurated in May 1984 by Stroessner and his Brazilian counterpart, the dictator João Figueiredo. More than $2 billion in U.S. aid for Brazil as a whole arrived during this era under the Alliance for Progress, helping to strengthen Brazil's financial and energy sectors and enabling financing for Paraguay's share of Itaipu’s construction.

==== The restoration of democracy ====
U.S. relations with Stroessner soured beginning with the 1976 election of President Jimmy Carter. Washington grew ever more vocal about Stroessner's human rights abuses. In a 1980 landmark ruling, a United States court found the Stroesser regime kidnapped and fatally tortured 17-year-old Joelito Filártiga, affirming U.S. jurisdiction over certain violations of human rights governed by international law. Meanwhile, the collapse of Soviet power in the late 1980s relieved the United States of any strategic interest in propping up anti-communist dictators in Latin America. When General Andrés Rodríguez moved to topple the regime in February 1989, Washington lent Stroessner no support and did not criticize the military coup, as it had done before. After driving Stroessner into exile and assuming the presidency, Rodríguez pledged to restore democracy in Paraguay, a goal the United States embraced. Rodríguez presided over constitutional changes, including a single-term limit for the presidency that bans re-election after five years of service. Accordingly, he stepped down in 1993 in favor of Juan Carlos Wasmosy, who won what Carter and other international observers regarded as Paraguay's first free and fair election in more than 50 years. Each Paraguayan president since that time has left office after no more than five years of service, though all but one have belonged to the Colorado Party.

=== 21st century ===
USAID previously oversaw the bulk of all financial backing for Paraguay sent from the United States, but 2025 cuts appear to have curtailed this.

In recent years, the U.S. Agency for International Development has administered most U.S. expenses to assist Paraguay; only about 4 percent of total funding has supported military purposes, compared with 96 percent for economic development. USAID's largest single project, valued at about $1.85 million annually, sought to counter deforestation and encourage better land use and management by improving monitoring and enforcement of environmental regulations. Total U.S. government funding for all agencies operating in Paraguay fell from a peak of $51.3 million in 2010 to about $4.4 million as of October 2025. Analysts have suggested that the downward trend accelerated amid large-scale cuts by the Trump administration to USAID operations worldwide. The Biden Administration funded about $25.4 million in projects in 2022.

==== Anti-corruption efforts ====
U.S. diplomats and aid agencies have gradually stepped up initiatives to reduce corruption in Paraguay since the administration of President Barack Obama, when a global survey of public-sector integrity ranked Paraguay 154th out of 180 countries, with 180 representing the worst perceived performance. By 2024, the same index ranked Paraguay 149th out of 180, a marginal improvement over 2009 but reflecting a four-point decline from the previous year’s ranking. Analysts have attributed the country’s limited progress to the continued dominance of the ruling Colorado Party over legislative, bureaucratic, and law-enforcement institutions, fostering a culture of impunity even after opposition candidate Fernando Lugo won the presidency in 2008. The lifting of sanctions in 2025 on former president Cartes marked the first instance in the 21st century in which Washington reversed a major anti-corruption measure targeting a Paraguayan politician.

==== Taiwan recognition ====
Paraguay is one of 12 sovereign states that maintain full diplomatic relations with Taiwan (officially, the Republic of China) and consequently have no formal relations with the People's Republic of China. The mainland Chinese government maintains a policy that states seeking diplomatic relations with it cannot simultaneously maintain official ties with Taiwan; most United Nations member states have adopted this "One China" worldview. The United States recognizes only the People's Republic of China and has no formal diplomatic relations with Taiwan, yet it remains Taiwan's most important strategic partner in unofficial channels.

After Beijing persuaded Honduras and Nauru to switch recognition, the 2023 Paraguayan general election saw opposition candidate Efraín Alegre push to switch recognition from Taiwan to the People’s Republic of China. Peña pledged to maintain relations with Taipei, and went on to win the presidency by about 15 percentage points. The modern Colorado Party inherited Stroessner's staunch anti-Communist stance. Taiwan has helped Paraguay with hundreds of millions of dollars in loans, grants and investment, and Asunción is the site of a Republic of China embassy.

Washington has cautiously promoted Paraguay–Taiwan relations, but in July 2025 the Trump administration denied Taiwanese President Lai Ching-te permission to stop in New York City en route to Guatemala, Belize and Paraguay, the three Latin American republics that retain official relations with the ROC. Analysts observed the U.S. would risk inflaming tensions with Beijing by allowing a Taiwanese presidential transit on U.S. soil, which could undermine talks amid the ongoing China–United States trade war. Bloomberg News reported President Lai intends as of December 2025 to go ahead with his Latin American visits in the near future after his government received assurances that he will have permission to land in the U.S.

==== Security and defense cooperation ====
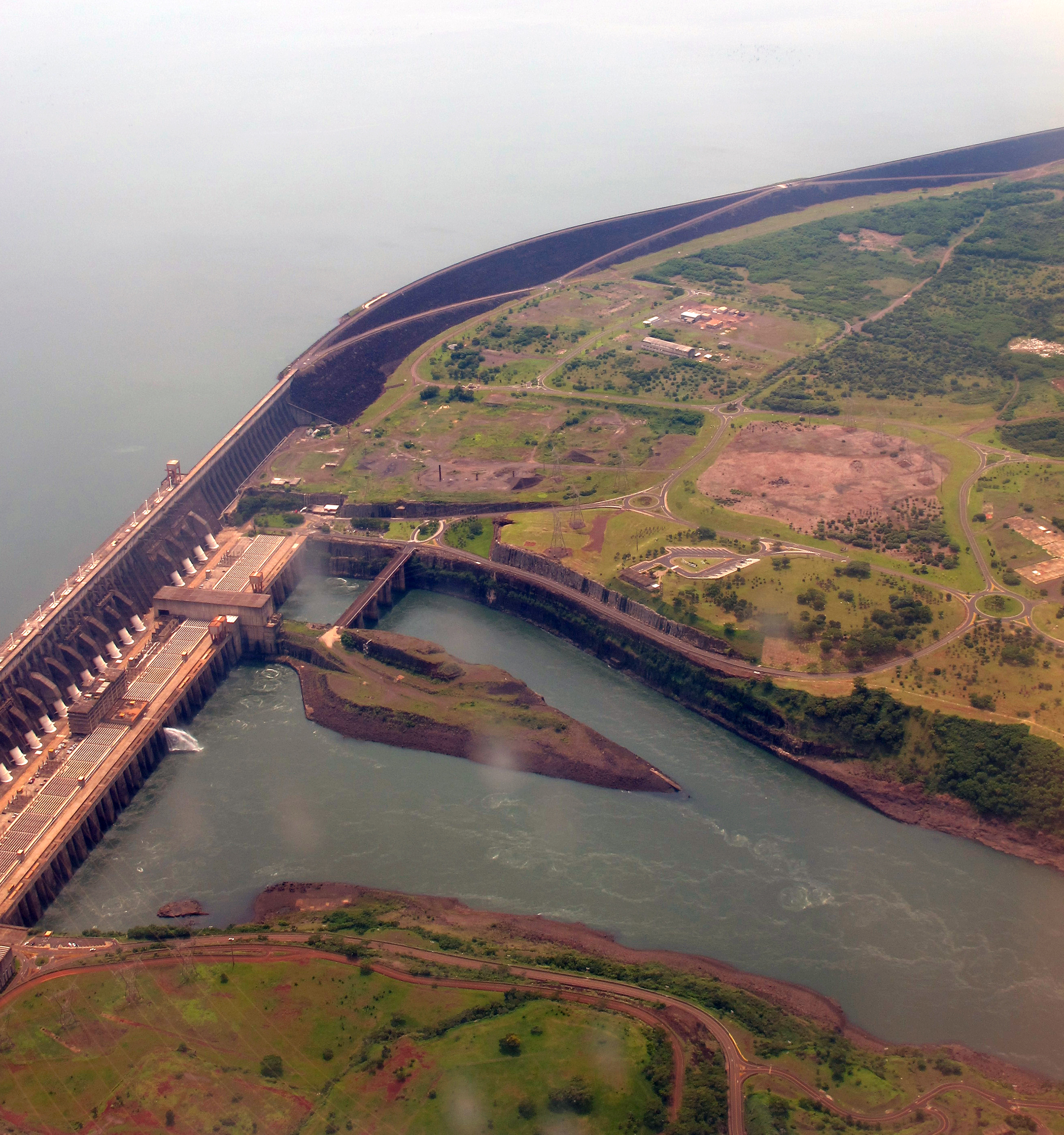
The Itaipú Dam underpins South America's international energy market, though its reservoir flooded about 1,350 km², submerging the Guaíra Falls and extensive natural habitats.

The United States Southern Command (SOUTHCOM) conducts joint training and security-cooperation activities with Paraguay’s armed forces, focusing on counter-narcotics, cyber defense, and regional stability. In 2024, Paraguayan and U.S. Marine forces met in Asunción to plan future bilateral exercises, and a joint cybersecurity review identified foreign espionage threats to Paraguayan networks. Peña also visited SOUTHCOM headquarters in Florida to discuss these cooperative efforts. The United States cooperates with Paraguayan authorities in the Triple Frontier area, where the borders of Paraguay, Brazil, and Argentina converge. U.S. agencies have supported joint investigations targeting narcotics trafficking, money-laundering, and terror financing networks in the region. The U.S. Department of the Treasury has sanctioned several individuals accused of financing Hezbollah from Ciudad del Este since the early 2000s.

==== Environmental issues ====
Paraguay depends on hydroelectric power generation both for its own needs and to sell energy to neighboring countries; the Itaipú Dam and Yacyretá Dam underpin South America's international energy market, though each created a reservoir that inundated thousands of square kilometers, together displacing more than 100,000 people and destroying the habitat of countless species. Chronic trends of deforestation in Paraguay continue, with the livestock industry identified as a major driver; ranchers clear forest and burn land to make room for pasture and fodder. The United States’ role in this dynamic is complex: policymakers have sought to encourage renewable energy development while discouraging habitat loss and unsustainable land use. The expansion of Paraguay’s beef industry is also influenced by higher global demand, a trend that the Trump administration has encouraged South American producers to fulfill, in hopes of reducing domestic consumer prices.

== Socioeconomic relations ==
=== Trade ===
In 2024, U.S. goods exports to Paraguay totaled about $3.2 billion, while imports from Paraguay were approximately $356 million, resulting in a U.S. trade surplus of roughly $2.8 billion. Major U.S. multinationals such as Cargill, Millicom (operating as Tigo), and Citibank operate in Paraguay, primarily in the agro-industrial, telecommunications, and financial sectors.

Paraguay’s top export is soy and soy derivatives, which find limited traction in the United States given U.S. dominance in soy production and the cost disadvantages Paraguay faces as a landlocked exporter. Paraguay’s "meat and edible offal" (predominantly beef) is its second-largest export. After years of diplomatic efforts by Paraguay, the United States in late 2023 permitted imports of chilled or frozen Paraguayan beef under strict health controls, having previously banned it over fears of foot and mouth disease. In 2023, U.S. beef imports from Paraguay were minimal (approximately 75 tons). In the first half of 2025, that figure climbed to about 19,800 tons (valued at roughly $111.9 million), marking a rapid expansion of market access and demand. The new imports help fulfill U.S. demand in light of lower domestic cattle headcounts, primarily owed to higher production costs.

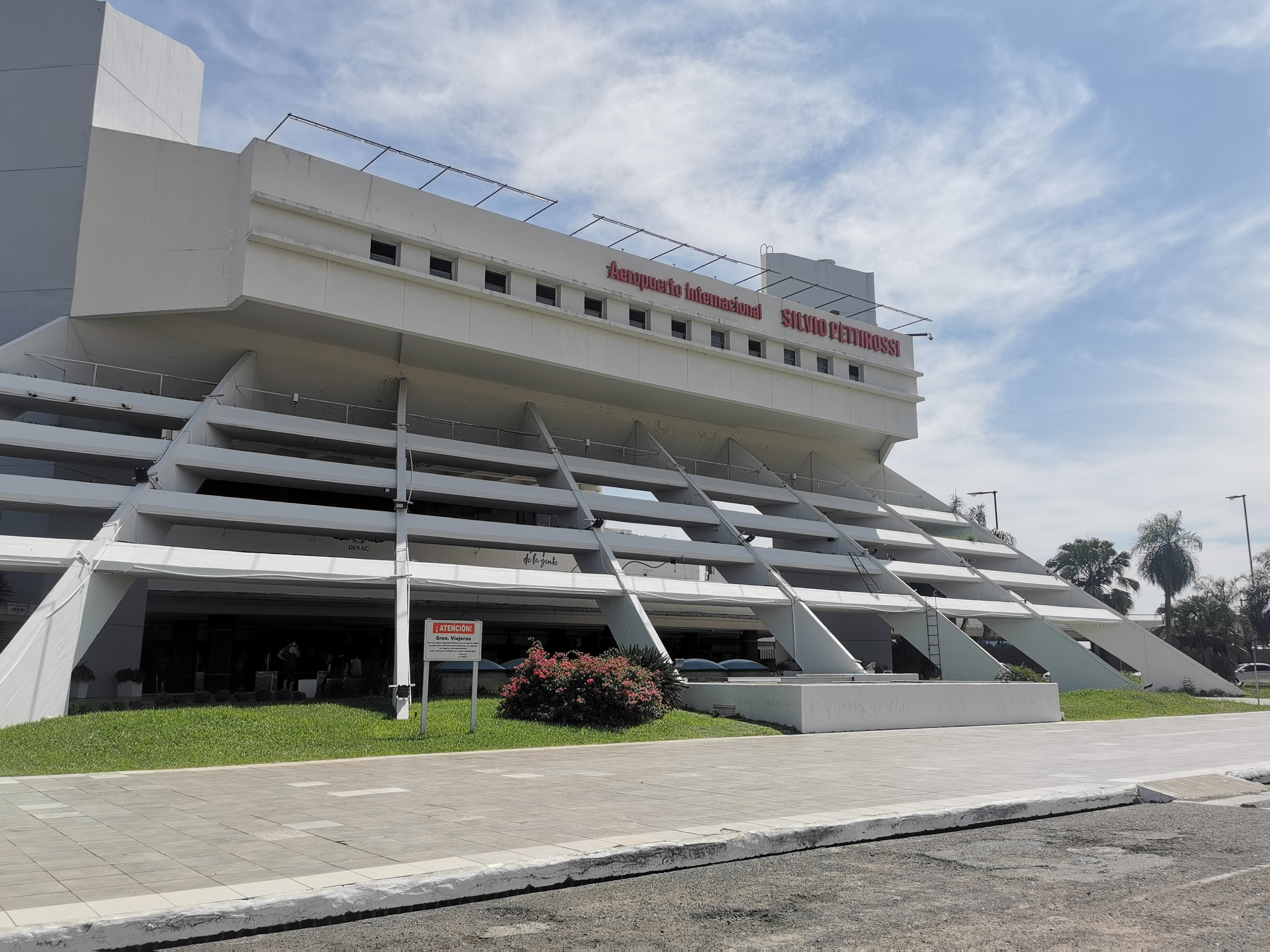
Silvio Pettirossi International Airport in Luque handles almost all scheduled commercial passenger traffic into Paraguay, but there are no direct U.S. routes available.

The U.S.-Paraguay trade imbalance is largely driven by manufactured goods and resources that Paraguay cannot produce domestically. Machinery, such as construction equipment and climate-control systems, accounted for an estimated $542 million in 2024, making it likely the highest-value trade category between the two countries. Mineral fuels, oils, and distillation products generated about $477 million from Paraguay in U.S. enterprises that same year.

=== Migration ===
In the first half of 2023, Paraguay received 8,032 visitors from the United States, according to Paraguay's Secretaría Nacional de Turismo (Senatur, "National Tourism Secretariat"). The U.S. Embassy in Asunción issued 10,325 nonimmigrant visas in 2023. As with nearly all countries in Latin America, holders of Paraguayan passports must obtain a visa through the U.S. Department of State to enter the United States for any purpose, including tourism, study, or employment. In contrast, U.S. citizens may enter Paraguay visa-free for up to 90 days. Tourist stays can generally be extended once, for up to an additional 90 days, by applying to Paraguay’s Dirección Nacional de Migraciones (DNM, "National Immigration Directorate"). These 90-day stays do not confer the right to engage in paid employment in Paraguay. Foreign nationals who are lawfully present in the country may, however, apply for a work visa or for temporary or permanent residence through the DNM.

In August 2025, the United States and Paraguay signed a safe third country agreement that allows U.S. authorities to transfer to Paraguay any nationals of third countries who had applied for asylum while in U.S. territory. Under the memorandum, people transferred are to remain in Paraguay until a final decision is made on their protection claims. Both governments presented the agreement as strengthening their strategic partnership and helping to manage irregular migration in the hemisphere. In Paraguay, critics including ABC Color described the arrangement as turning the country into a U.S. migration "waiting room." They objected that the memorandum entered into force immediately without being submitted to the Congress, which they argued is unconstitutional in Paraguay; ABC Color also reported that its implementation is subject to each side’s own financial and technical capacity, and that neither the U.S. nor Paraguay is obligated to cover the other's costs under the arrangement.

==== Transportation ====
United States-Paraguay air travelers have experienced differing patterns of difficulty over the years. American Airlines launched nonstop Miami–Asunción service in November 2012 and ended the route in March 2015, leaving landlocked Paraguay without direct U.S. access. A group using the Eastern Airlines name launched Miami–Asunción service in January 2021, but suspended the route in March 2023. GOL Airlines announced its intent to re-establish Miami-Asuncion service in 2026, but high prices driven by the Iran war prompted GOL to cancel its plans. All scheduled international passenger flights to Paraguay land at Silvio Pettirossi International Airport (ASU) near Asunción. During the second half of 2025, the low-cost carrier Flybondi opened a new route between Buenos Aires and Encarnación (ENO), but it lasted only a handful of months.

Most itineraries between the United States and Paraguay route via at least one major hub in South or Central America, such as São Paulo–Guarulhos in Brazil, Santiago in Chile, Bogotá in Colombia, Santa Cruz de la Sierra in Bolivia, Lima in Peru, or Panama City. ASU also has direct service to Aeroparque Jorge Newbery (AEP). Since late 2019, Air Europa has operated a nonstop Madrid–Barajas Airport (MAD)–ASU service, which expanded to daily flights in 2025; as of late 2025 this is Paraguay’s only direct air link to a place outside the Americas. In May 2025, Paranair ended service between Asunción and Guaraní International Airport (AGT) near Ciudad del Este, eliminating Paraguay's last domestic commercial passenger air route. A passenger train service no longer exists in Paraguay, forcing most travelers in the country to rely on private vehicles and intercity bus services, although a number of ferries operate on Paraguay's rivers.

No sitting U.S. president has ever visited Paraguay; former U.S. president Jimmy Carter traveled there in 1993 to observe the country’s first widely recognized free and fair election after the Stroessner regime.

=== Cultural exchange ===
United Nations data indicate that about 13.7 percent — roughly 890,000 people — of all Paraguayans were living abroad as of 2020, including approximately 46,000 in the United States. Conversely, there is no clear indication of how many U.S. citizens currently reside in Paraguay; the U.S. Department of State estimated “more than 3,000” as of 2017. According to U.S. Census and ACS data, concentrations of Paraguayan-born U.S. residents have existed in New York, Florida, and New Jersey. Programs such as Fulbright Paraguay and EducationUSA provide scholarships and advising for Paraguayan students enrolled in U.S. institutions, who numbered about 732 in 2023. The Centro Cultural Paraguayo Americano (CCPA, "Paraguayan-American Cultural Center") of Asunción, established in 1942, hosts English-language instruction, art exhibitions, and cultural events to strengthen bilateral ties.

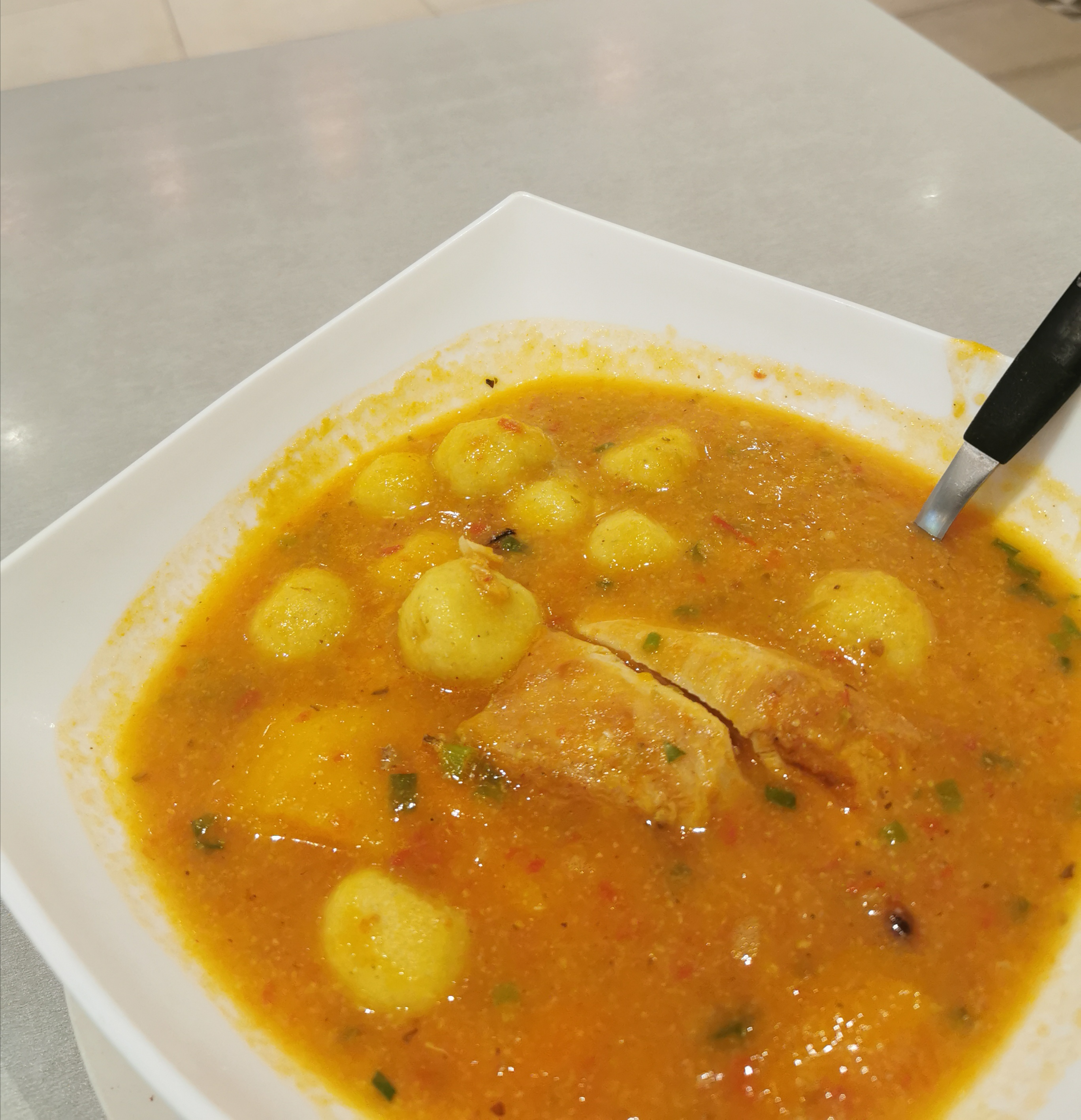
A bowl of vori vori, a traditional Paraguayan soup made with cornmeal and cheese balls.

Paraguayan cuisine has not yet gained a significant following in the United States, amid rapid growth in popularity for the style of steakhouses that originated in neighboring Brazil. U.S. media and restaurant reviews document very few restaurants devoted to Paraguayan dishes, such as vori vori and chipa guasu. By contrast, U.S. food styles and brands are featured throughout Asunción and Paraguay as a whole, illustrating a common pattern of globalization. Survey data suggest that McDonald's and Burger King, in operation in Paraguay since the latter 20th century, have the most name recognition among consumers of hamburgers, outpacing local brands like Pancholo's.

While Paraguay has produced virtually no entertainers of worldwide fame who are active in the United States, Paraguayan affinity for the harp has produced a number of artists who performed or settled in the U.S. as part of cultural exchange initiatives. Paraguayan actress Maia Nikiphoroff is one of the few from her country currently active in the U.S. film industry to have attained leading roles. Miguel Almirón plays professional football for Major League Soccer club Atlanta United and is expected to compete in the 2026 FIFA World Cup, which will be hosted in the United States, Mexico, and Canada, as a member of the Paraguay national team. Cristhian Paredes competes in MLS for the Portland Timbers.

== Resident diplomatic missions ==
- Paraguay has an embassy in Washington, D.C., and consulates-general in Los Angeles, Miami and New York City. Ambassador Gustavo Alfredo Leite Gusinky presented his credentials to President Trump in September 2025, notably wearing a Make America Great Again hat during the event. Ambassador Laterza de los Ríos did not repeat the gesture when she officially replaced Gusinky in September 2026.
- The United States opened a new embassy complex in June 2023, on the same 14-acre site as its previous buildings in Asunción. Robert Alter serves as the Chargé d’affaires in light of the ongoing vacancy in the office of U.S. ambassador.
- Outside of the embassy complex in Asunción, the United States operates the Margaret Knight American Corner in Ciudad del Este, an office for cultural and educational programming about the U.S. Consular services such as visa applications require an embassy visit in Asunción.
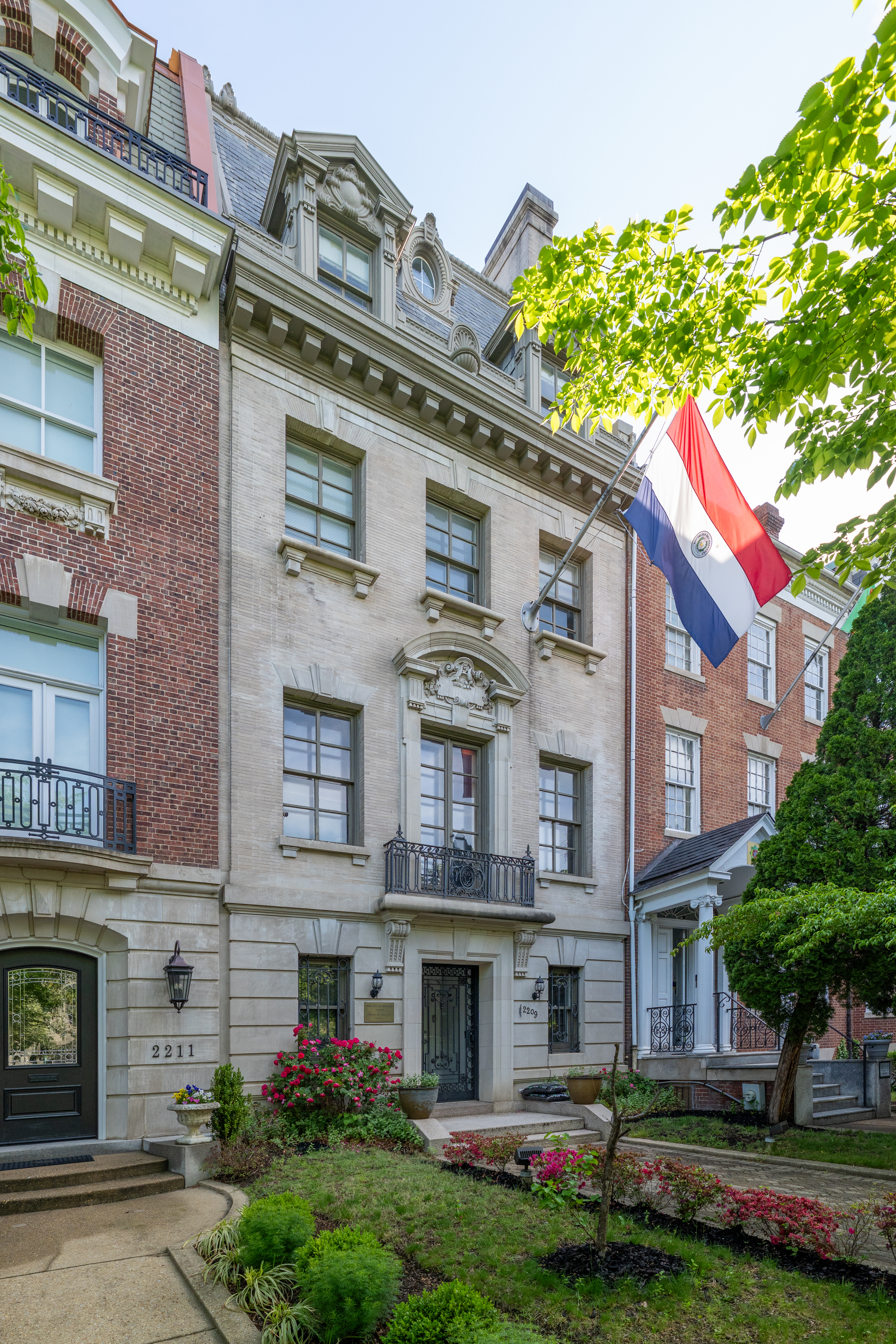
Embassy of Paraguay in Washington, D.C.

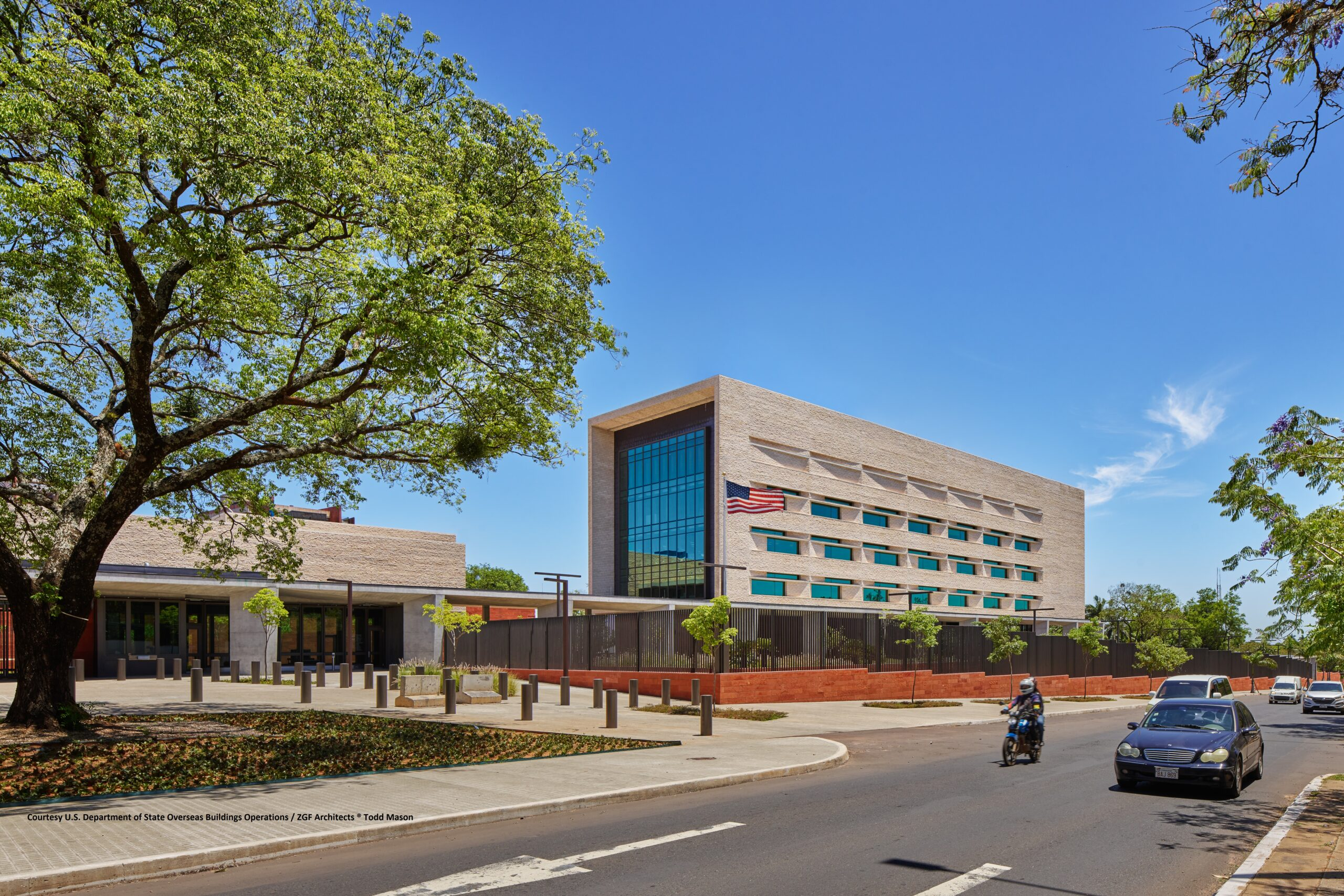
Embassy of the United States in Asunción

== See also ==
- Paraguayan Americans
