= Pecado Original =

Pecado Original may refer to:

- Pecado Original, a 2017 film directed by Jean Lee starring Maia Nikiphoroff
- Pecado Original (album), by Ana Gabriel
- Pecado Original, an album by Alexandre Pires
- Pecado Original, an album by Pilar Homem de Melo

== See also ==
- Pescado Original, an album by Enanitos Verdes
