= Léa Bello =

French journalist (born 1987)

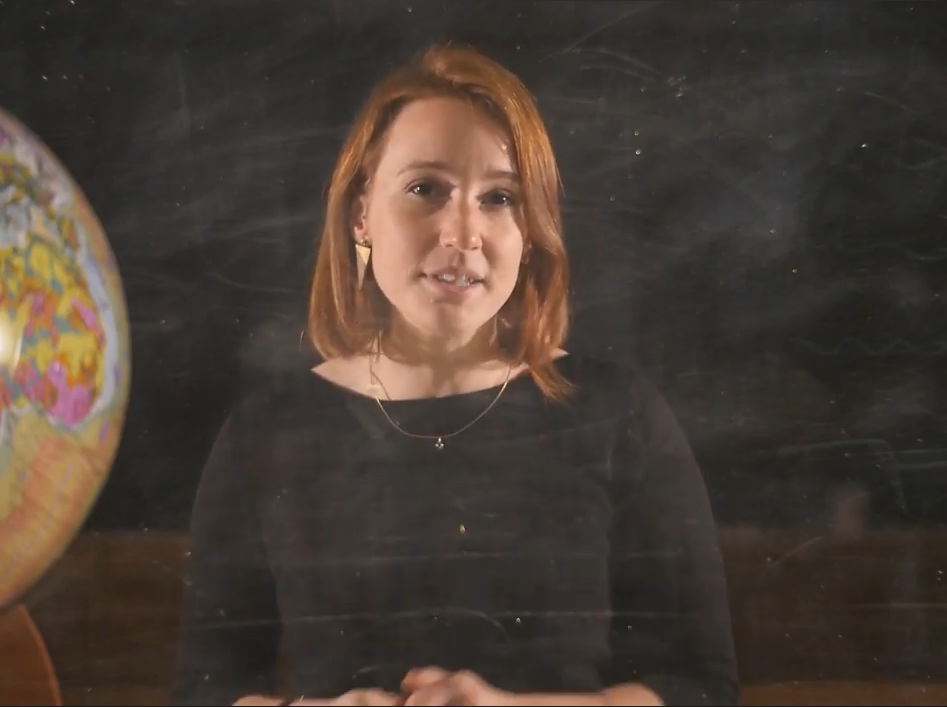

Léa Bello (born 15 March 1987, in Arles, France) is a French videographer, journalist, doctor of geophysics and science popularizer. She has presented the web series Zeste de science and taken part in other science outreach programs.

== Biography ==
Léa Bello graduated from the École normale supérieure in Lyon with a PhD in geophysics. In January 2015, she defended her thesis in Earth sciences, entitled "Prediction of terrestrial convective structures", before training in scientific communication at the Institut de la communication et des médias [Fr] in Grenoble. She holds a master's degree in scientific communication.

At the end of 2017, the CNRS launched the popular science YouTube channel Zeste de science, hosted by Léa Bello, where, in "an offbeat tone, she presents ongoing research or a recent discovery". In 2019, she teamed up with Sébastien Carassou for the international science film festival, and their script on paleoclimatology won the Science & Live TV – Science "shorts" prize.

She then joined the team behind the YouTube channel Le Vortex [Fr], launched in March 2019, and also focusing on popularizing science, where she and Manon Bril [Fr] published a video on gender stereotypes and household appliances. Léa Bello participates in other science channels, such as Avides de recherche, where she delivers an analysis of Netflix, and Balade mentale [Fr], on underwater life.
