= Maia Nikiphoroff =

Actor

Maia Nikiphoroff is a Paraguayan actress, model and dancer who studied at the Stella Adler Academy of Acting in Los Angeles. She speaks English, Spanish and German. Before fully diving into acting Maia worked as a flight attendant for the airline Emirates and graduated from the University of Phoenix with a degree in marketing studies.

Recent Movies: ‘No Sound of Birds’ directed by Joakim Grandberg Linden, ‘Paloma’ directed by Jean Lee (for AFI Director's Women Workshop), ‘Somewhere’ directed by Laura Gutiérrez (aired in JavoraiTV in Paraguay), ‘Ritual’ directed by Lauren Merage, ‘Harbinger’ directed by Nathan Christ for AFI and 'Lost Angels' directed by Stan Harrington among others film credits.

Recent Theater Credits: ‘Isaac Babel and the Black Sea’ (Feyga, Osip Mandelstam and Anna Akhmatova) written and directed by Tim McNeil (workshop for Broadway), ‘Purplish’ (Mona) directed by Alex Aves, ‘The Seagull’ (Nina) directed by Tim McNeil and ‘The Rose Tattoo’ (Strega) directed by Yorgos Karamihos, among others.

In 2019 the movie Pecado Original (Original Sin) was released in which she co-wrote, co-produced, and starred in with Cesar Di Bello, Alejandro Torres Menchaca, Licia Alonso and the Paraguayan actor Tomás Pérez. Paraguayan national artist Cacho Falcon also participated and collaborated on the film.
