= Mirko Bullo =

Swiss footballer (born 1959)

Personal information
- Date of birth: 26 September 1959 (age 67)
- Position: Defender

Senior career*
Years	Team	Apps	(Gls)
1981–1982	AC Bellinzona		
1981–1989	FC Lugano		
- * Club domestic league appearances and goals

Mirko Bullo (born 26 September 1959) is a retired Swiss football defender.
