= Carolina Bello =

Uruguayan writer

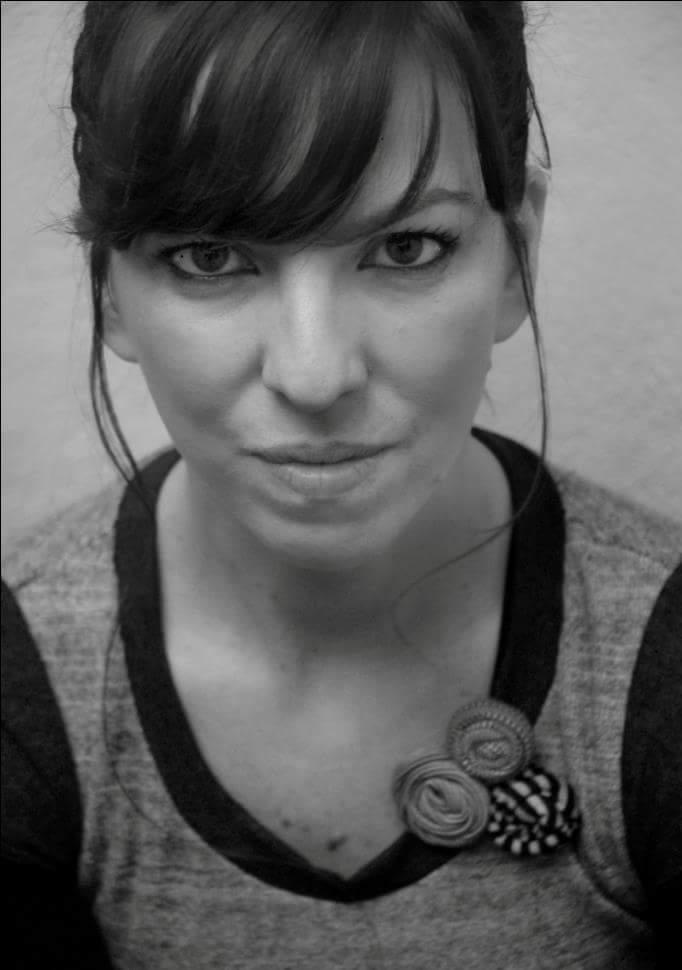
- 2014
- Born: 27 April 1983 (age 43); Montevideo, Uruguay
- Education: University of the Republic
- Occupation: Writer

Carolina Bello (born 27 April 1983) is a Uruguayan writer. She is an expert in social communication, with a postgraduate degree in art criticism.

== Biography ==
She has a licentiate from the Faculty of Humanities and Education Sciences at the University of the Republic. From 2005 to 2008 she maintained the blog Escrito en la ventanilla; the tales published there would be compiled into her first book of short stories of the same name. As a journalist she has written for publications such as Deltoya, Cine Bizarro, Zona Freak, 33 Cines, Ya te conté, and El Boulevard. She contributes to the newspaper La Diaria and the narrative journalism magazine Quiroga, and writes the blog Por la noche callada.

Her influences include American authors such as John Fante and Carson McCullers.

== Awards and honours ==
In 2016 she won the Gutenberg Award, given by the European Union and the publisher Editorial Fin de Siglo, for her novel Urquiza.

== Works ==
- Escrito en la ventanilla (Montevideo, Irrupciones Grupo Editor, 2011)
- Saturnino (Maldonado, Trópico Sur Editor, 2013)
- Urquiza (Montevideo, Fin de Siglo, 2016)
- Viejas bravas (co-author; Montevideo, Palabra Santa, 2017)

Some of her stories have been included in various anthologies and literary journals: Neues vom Fluss (Berlin, Lettrétage, 2010), a German anthology of young Latin American writers; 22 mujeres (Montevideo, Irrupciones Grupo Editor, 2012); Fóbal (Montevideo, Estuario, 2013); Hispamérica, an American journal (2014); Negro (Montevideo, Estuario, 2016); Antología de narrativa joven uruguaya (La Habana, 2016); and Casa (La Habana, 2016), a Cuban journal.
