= Fernando Bello =

Fernando Bello may refer to

- Fernando Bello (footballer) (Blas Fernando Bello, 1910–1974), Argentine football goalkeeper
- Fernando Bello (sailor, born 1924) (Fernando Pinto Coelho de Almeida Bello, 1924–1995), Portuguese Olympic sailor in 1948–64
- Fernando Bello (sailor, born 1957) (Fernando Bustorff Silva de Almeida Bello), Portuguese Olympic sailor in 1992
- Fernando Lima Bello (1931–2021), Portuguese Olympic sailor in 1968–72 and member of the International Olympic Committee
- José Bello Amigo (José Fernando Bello Amigo Serans, born 1978), Spanish-born Australian football goalkeeper
