= Bello Shugaba =

Nigerian politician

Bello Shugaba is a Nigerian politician from Yobe State, Nigeria. He was a member of the House of Representatives representing Machina/Nguru/Karasuwa/Yusufari Federal constituency for two terms, his first term was from 1999 to 2003 and the second term from 2003 to 2007.
