= Louie Bello =

American singer

- Born: Boston, Massachusetts, United States
- Occupations: Singer; Song-writer
- Years active: 2009–present
- Website: louiebello.com

Louie Bello (born December 30) is an American singer and songwriter based in Boston. He is also a former Sony ATV writer and Boston Music Awards winner who can be seen at venues around the country from Boston to Texas.

== Career ==
Bello has written and performed with dozens of national recording artists and he is the writer and performer of the title song for the ESPN documentary, PUSH. He has performed in local and national music festivals, such as Boston Fest Red Gorilla Festival, SXSW, Phantom Gourmet's Summer BBQ. His songs are placed on major networks such as VH1-The Kardashians, ABC-Lincoln Heights.
