= Bello Hassan Shinkafi =

Nigerian politician

Member of the House of Representatives
- In office 2019–2027

Personal details
- Born: Zamfara State, Nigeria
- Party: All Progressives Congress
- Occupation: Politician

Bello Hassan Shinkafi is a Nigerian politician from Zamfara State. He is the serving member house of representatives Shinkafi/Zurmi Federal Constituency in the House of Representatives since 2019 under the platform of the All Progressives Congress (APC).
