= Bello Muhammad Goronyo =

Nigerian politician

State Representative
- Constituency: Goronyo

Personal details
- Born: January 1, 1966 (age 60)
- Occupation: Politician, Lawyer

Bello Muhammad Goronyo (born January 1, 1966) is a Nigerian lawyer and politician currently serving as Minister of State for Works. He previously served as a member of the Sokoto State House of Assembly, representing Goronyo Constituency from 2007 to 2015, where he served as minority leader and deputy speaker.

== Early life and education ==
Goronyo was born in Goronyo Local Government Area, Sokoto State. He attended Kofar Marke Primary School, Sokoto from 1975 to 1981 and Government College, Sokoto from 1981 to 1986. He obtained a Diploma in Law from the College of Arts and Science, Sokoto, in 1990, an LLB from Usmanu Danfodiyo University, Sokoto, in 1997, and was called to the Nigerian Bar in 2001.

== Career ==
Goronyo was a two-term member of the Sokoto State House of Assembly from 2007 to 2015. He was later appointed as a commissioner in the Sokoto State Government (2015–2018), serving in the Ministries of Solid Minerals, Energy Development, and Information. In 2023, he was appointed as Minister of State for Works by President Bola Ahmed Tinubu.
