= 2017 Bronx-Lebanon Hospital shooting =

Mass shooting in New York, U.S.

- Location: 40.843546°N 73.910834°W; Bronx-Lebanon Hospital Center, 1650 Grand Concourse, The Bronx, New York, U.S.
- Date: June 30, 2017 c. 2:45pm (EDT)
- Target: Hospital staff
- Attack type: Murder-suicide; workplace violence; mass shooting
- Weapon: .223-caliber Anderson Manufacturing AM-15 semi-automatic rifle
- Deaths: 2 (including the perpetrator)
- Injuries: 6
- Perpetrator: Henry Michael Bello

On June 30, 2017, at around 2:45 p.m. EDT, 45-year-old Henry Michael Bello opened fire at the Bronx-Lebanon Hospital Center in the Bronx, New York City, United States, killing a doctor on the 17th floor and wounding six people on the 16th floor with an AR-15-type semi-automatic rifle. Bello was a family physician formerly employed by the hospital.

== Background ==
Dr. David Lazala, a graduate of the family medical residency program and current faculty member, told the Associated Press that he was one of the physicians training Bello, who sent Lazala a threatening email after being fired. He took Friday off and was reportedly the target of the attack. Dr. Maureen Kwankam said she fired Bello after two years of employment. Kwankam further stated "We fired him because he was kind of crazy. He promised to come back and kill us then."

Hours before the shooting, Bello sent an e-mail to the New York Daily News, making various accusations in regards to his firing, stating "First, I was told it was because I always kept to myself. Then it was because of an altercation with a nurse. Then I was told, it was because I threatened a colleague." Bello blamed a specific doctor for blocking his career progress and costing him $400,000.

== Incident ==
Bello arrived at the hospital with the rifle concealed underneath his coat. He entered by presenting his ID before going to the 16th floor. On the 16th floor, he encountered a doctor. He shouted at him, "Why didn't you help me out when I was getting in trouble!?". He pulled out the AR-15 from his coat and fired at the doctor. The shot missed and the doctor ran away while yelling "Gun! Gun! Gun!". Bello proceeded to enter the nurses station. In the nurses station, he fired at everyone inside, even people running from him in the hallway. He wounded six people in total. After shooting several rounds, Bello took out a Tropicana juice container filled with gasoline and started pouring it all over the nurses station before dropping a match, starting a fire. Bello proceeded upstairs to the 17th floor.

Dr. Tracy Tam was shot and killed in the hallway of the 17th floor of the hospital. Tam was randomly targeted, according to Dr. Sridhar Chilimuri, the hospital chief. Bello intended to kill the doctor who had cost him his job by accusing him of sexual harassment. Tam, who normally worked in the clinic, was asked to cover a shift of a physician who was out.

Six others (three doctors, two medical students and a patient) were injured. The most seriously wounded was a doctor shot in the knee and brain, who underwent several hours of surgery on-site and was sent to Mt. Sinai Hospital for further care. The other two doctors were shot in the neck and abdomen, one student was shot in the hand and the patient had an unspecified minor injury.

The New York City Police Department said Bello committed suicide after barricading himself inside an office with a rifle and setting himself on fire and shooting himself in the chest. Moments after shooting himself, Bello staggered out of the office before collapsing outside.

== Victims ==
Tracy Tam, DO, a family medicine physician and graduate of Touro College of Osteopathic Medicine, was killed.

Justin Timperio, MD, a first year family medicine resident and a graduate of the American University of the Caribbean, was shot and sustained injuries to the liver, stomach, intestines, and lung. Oluwafunmike Ojewoye, MD, a second year family medicine resident and a graduate of Temple University School of Medicine sustained a neck gunshot wound. A gastroenterology fellow doing a consult sustained a hand gunshot wound. Two medical students from Ross University School of Medicine were shot, one to the head and knee. A patient was also injured and was listed in stable condition while the others were deceased or in critical condition. Timperio was transferred to Mount Sinai Hospital, according to his father, Luciano Timperio, an oral surgeon from St. Catharines, Ontario, Canada; the senior Timperio blamed the lack of medical school positions in Ontario for his son's injuries.

== Perpetrator ==
Henry Michael Bello (born Henry Williams Obotetukudo) had formerly worked for the hospital and was born in Nigeria. He had resigned from the hospital amid a sexual harassment complaint two years prior. He was a graduate of Ross University School of Medicine in Dominica and was formerly a pharmacy technician in California, where he lived from 1991 until 2006. He worked as a night shift doctor at the hospital while trying to be admitted into the family medical residency program.

== Aftermath ==
Bello killed himself on the 16th floor of the hospital after the attack. In March 2018, Timperio filed a lawsuit against Bronx Lebanon Hospital Center and a gun dealer who sold Bello a modified AR-15.

== See also ==
- Workplace violence
