= César Di Bello =

Spanish actor

César Di Bello is a filmmaker, theater director and actor. His preferred themes to explore are the drama of immigration, class differences, the intricacies of relationships and family dynamics.

He was born in Buenos Aires, Argentina. When he was 7 years old he moved with his family to Madrid, Spain.

== Academic Training ==
César studied acting in Los Angeles (Stella Adler Academy of Acting and Theater and Howard Fine). In Spain, he studied in Bululú 2120 and Cristina Rota School.

He studied Directing for Film and TV at UCLA Extension.

Before switching to a more creative life, he got a Degree in Law, another one on Business Management and a Master in Human and Professional Leadership at Universidad Francisco de Vitoria. He also studied a Master in Private Law at the Colegio de Abogados de Madrid.

== Professional experience (Filmmaking and Theatre Director) ==
As a filmmaker, César has directed A Ride, Camila and Elena. He produced the feature film Pecado Original (Original Sin) which had a great festival run (Austin Film Festival, Cinequest, and other festivals across the US and the globe). Pecado Original was purchased by HBO for a multi platform distribution (HBO, HBO Latino and Max).

César has directed several plays, his most outstanding ones are "The Importance of Being Earnest" by Oscar Wilde and "The Dumb Waiter" by Harold Pinter. Both of them were in collaboration with the Stella Adler Lab Theater Company. Additionally, he directed original plays (Take Me Out, The Most Brave Girl in the Whole Wide World and Blue Christmas) for the Non Profit A Light in Dark Places.

As a crew member (Production Manager, 2nd AD, Crowd Director,...), he has worked in several productions for brands like Penguin and AJR, music videos for bands like Hollow Coves or multiple films as Luna Azul.

== Acting experience (Theatre, film and TV) ==
César has acting credits in productions for Netflix (Heist), Telemundo (Milagros de Navidad), MAX (Pecado Original) and others.

On the stage he acted on: "Romeo and Juliet" (Prince of Verona and others, Dir: Alex Aves), “Misalliance” (John Tarleton, Dir: Susan Vinciotti Bonito), “Our Lady of 121st Street” (Balthazar, Dir. Bonnie McNeil), “45 Seconds From Broadway” (Charles, Dir. Milton Justice), "Compañía" (Miguel, Dir: Paul Alcaide) and “Six Degrees of Separation” (Eddie the Doorman, Dir. Milton Justice), among others.

National Commercials: César has played main or leading roles in national campaigns for brands like Burger King, Volkswagen and Microsoft for markets like the US, Spain or Turkey.

https://www.naludamagazine.com/interview-with-award-winning-actor-cesar-di-bello/

https://avmagz.com/cesar-di-bello-y-su-exito-mundial/
