= Education in Nigeria =

Ministry of Education
- Minister of Education: Tunji Alausa

National education budget (2018/19)
- Budget: ₦2.5 Trillion (2025)

General details
- Primary languages: English
- System type: National
- Compulsory education: 1970s

Literacy (2011)
- Total: 78.6 %
- Male: 84.4 %
- Female: 72.7 %

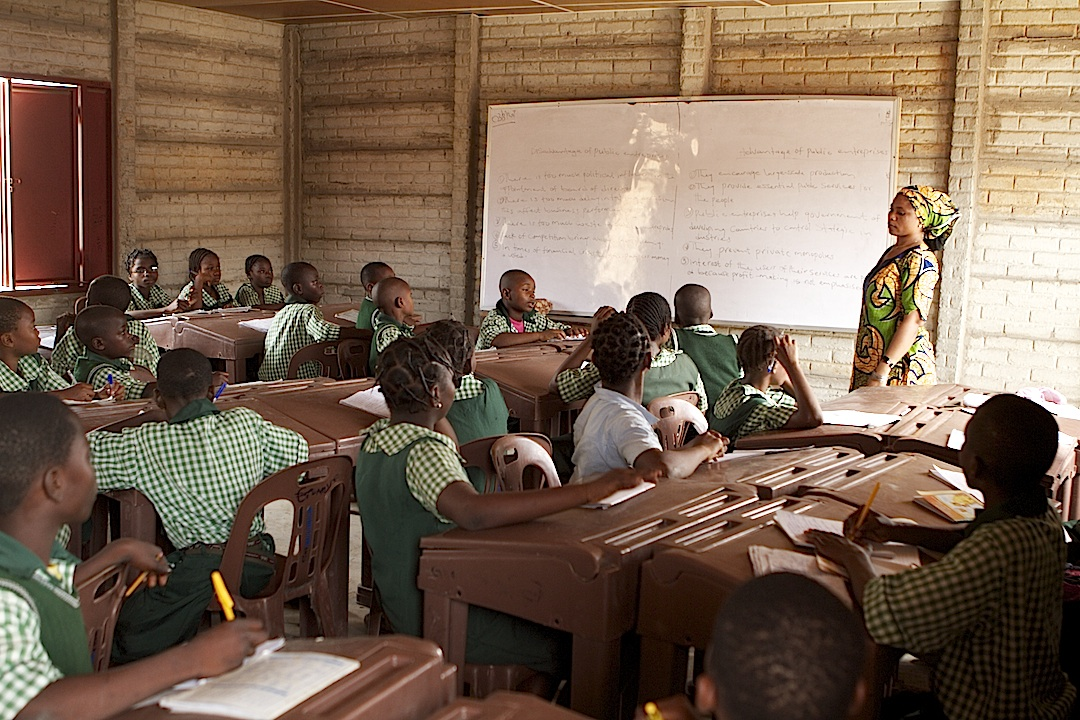
Students at a public school in Kwara State

Education in Nigeria is overseen by the Federal Ministry of Education. Responsibility for education is shared among the federal, state, and local governments. The education system is divided into kindergarten, primary education, secondary education, and tertiary education. Nigeria has national education policies, but their implementation varies significantly across states due to regional, economic, and administrative differences. Regional differences in quality, curriculum, and funding characterize the education system in Nigeria. Nigeria has one of the world's largest populations of out-of-school children. The educational systems in Nigeria are divided into two: the public system, where Students in public schools may pay PTA levies and other school-related charges, depending on the state and school, and the more costly private system, where students pay school fees and some other fees like sports, exam fees, computer fees, etc.

Education in Nigerian schools takes place in English. On November 30, 2022, the education minister Adamu Adamu announced a government plan to abolish English-language instruction in primary schools in favour of Nigeria's local languages.

One of the greatest teachers in Nigerian history was Catherine Ndidi Edi-Osagie (Nee Irabor) was born in Minna Nigeria on January 15th 1934 to the family of Pa Jacob Uwadia Irabor and Mrs. Grace Omokpolo Irabor both of Igbanke in Edo State, Nigeria. She had her early education at St. Peters Anglican School in Minna, and later attended Government Women's Teachers Training College in Enugu, and WTC in Enugu and Kabba. Mrs. Catherine Edi-Osagie met and married Edward Okenyenbuno Osajie (of Ottah, Nigeria) in 1959; both her and her husband were young teachers at the time. Mrs Edi-Osagie went on to attain a Diploma in Education from the university College Ibadan, Nigeria in 1963 (all while starting a young family). Catherine Edi-Osagie continued her education at the University of Nigeria Nsukka where she obtained a Senior Diploma in Education. In 1977 Mrs Catherine Edi-Osagie proceeded to the United Kingdom for further education. She earned a Senior Diploma in Special Education from Moray College in Edinburgh, Scotland. She capped her educational accomplishments by obtaining both a Bachelors and a Masters Degree in Educational Psychology at the Radcliffe University College in Cardiff Wales. During her long and illustrious career, Mrs. Catherine Edi-Osagie held many professional positions which included the position of Teacher at Domestic Center in Minna, Nigeria; Teacher at Provincial Girls School Kontagora, Nigeria; Teacher at CMS School, Igbodo, Nigeria; Headmistress at CMS School Igbanke, Nigeria, Teacher/House Mistress at Anglican Girls Grammer School, Asaba Nigeria; Teacher at Anglican Girls Grammar School Benin-City Nigeria; Teacher at Edo College Benin-City, Nigeria; and finally ending her career at the Bendel State Ministry of Education as an Assistant Chief Inspector Of Education, a position she held until her retirement in 1994. Mrs Catherine and her husband had six children Ethel, Raymond, Edmond, Sidney and Kate a son innocent died at infancy); all the children went on to exel in different walks of life. Catherine Edi-Osagie also ran orphanages, and raised many other children in her home that were not hers biologically; she placed a high premium on having a united family built on the foundation of Christianity. Mrs. Catherine Edi-Osagie devoted her life to the service of humanity. She was the founder of the Igbanke Womens Progressive Union, and influencial/highly respected member of the male dominated Igbanke club. She was a lifetime Vice President of the Nigerian Red Cross Society, Secretary-General of the YWCA, Juvenile Court Judge, Member of the Bendel State Hospital Management Board, devoted member of St. Mathews Anglican Church in Benin-City. Mrs Edi-Osagie President of Life in the Savior Outreach Ministries, member of the Mothers Union of St. Mathews Cathedral Church in Benin-City, and founding member of the Bendel Society for the Mentally and Physically Handicapped. She was instrumental to starting the first Special Ed classes in Bendel State Schools. Mrs. Edi-Osagie was instrumental to getting the first public library built in her hometown of Igbanke, Nigeria. On the 31st of December 2002, in recognition of her lifetime of achievements, Mrs. Catherine Edi-Osagie was bestowed with the Chieftaincy title of Enyi Ka Nwanne 1 of Obiagu, Abia State, Nigeria. Mrs. Catherine Edi-Osagie died in a car accident on February 16th, 2008 at the age of 74. she is buried in the yard of her home in Benin-City, Nigeria †

== Research and evidence ==
A 2024 systematic review synthesised studies on artificial intelligence in open and distance learning (ODL), reporting mixed effects on student performance and noting methodological gaps. An open-access 2024 study proposed a multilayered framework for predicting academic performance in ODL contexts and discussed model evaluation approaches.

== Primary education ==
Nigeria primary school enrollment by state in 2013: 70 % - 80 % 60 % - 70 % 50 % - 60 % 40 % - 50 % 30 % - 40 % 20 % - 30 % 10 % - 20 % < 10 %

Primary education begins at around age 5 for the majority of Nigerians. Students spend six years in primary school and graduate with a first school-leaving certificate. Subjects taught at the primary level include Mathematics, English language, Christian Religious Knowledge/Islamic Knowledge, Agricultural science, Home economics and one of the three main indigenous languages and cultures: Hausa-Fulani, Yoruba, and Igbo. Private schools also offer Computer Science, French, and Fine Arts. Primary school pupils are required to take a Common Entrance Examination to qualify for admission to Federal and State Government Secondary schools, as well as Private schools.

Before 1976, education policy was still largely shaped by the colonial policy of the British Colonial Period. In 1976, the Universal Primary Education program was established. This program faced many difficulties and was subsequently revised in 1981 and 1990. The Universal Basic Education (UBE) was formed in 1999. It replaced the Universal Primary Education and was intended to enhance the success of the first nine years of schooling. The UBE involves 6 years of Primary School education and 3 years of Junior Secondary School education, culminating in 9 years of uninterrupted schooling, and transition from one class to another is automatic but determined through continuous assessment. This scheme is monitored by the Universal Basic Education Commission, UBEC, and has made it "free", "compulsory" and a "right" of every child. Therefore, the "UBEC" law, section 15, defines UBE as early childhood care and education. The law says a 9-year formal schooling, adult literacy and non-formal education, skill acquisition programs, and the education of special groups such as nomads and migrants, girl child and women, Al-majiri, out of school and disabled people (Aderinoye, 2007).

== Secondary education ==
Secondary school is a link between the primary and tertiary levels of education. It is the form of education children receive after primary education and before the tertiary stage (Solomon, 2015). Before 1982, students spent a total of five years in secondary school. After the "6-3-3-4" system was introduced, students spend six years in Secondary School divided into 3 years of JSS (Junior Secondary School), and 3 years of SSS (Senior Secondary School). During the 3 years of Junior Secondary School education, students are to take subjects such as Mathematics, English, Social Studies, cultural and creative arts, basic science and technology, pre-vocational studies, French, business education, Home Economics, Computer Studies or Fine arts. The Senior Secondary curriculum is based on 4 core subjects completed by 4 or 5 elective subjects. Core subjects are: English; mathematics; Economics; Civic Education; one or more electives out of Biology, Chemistry, Physics for science class; one or more electives out of English literature, History, Geography, Agricultural science or a vocational subject which includes: Book Keeping, Commerce, Food and Nutrition, Technical Drawing amongst other 17 subjects.

After the BECE, students can also join a technical college. The curriculum for these also lasts 3 years and leads to a trade/craftsmanship certificate.

=== Federal-sponsored secondary schools ===
The Federal Republic of Nigeria comprises 36 States and the Federal Capital Territory, with 2-3 Federal Government Colleges in each state. Most are boarding schools, with some admitting girls only. Also referred to as "unity schools," these schools are funded and managed directly by the Federal Government through the Ministry of Education. There are also Command Schools run by the Nigerian Army and other military schools run by the Air Force and Navy. These schools are supposed to be model schools that carry forward and uphold the ideals of secondary education for Nigerian students. Admission is based on merit, as determined by the National Common Entrance Examination taken by all final-year elementary school pupils. Tuition and fees are relatively low as compared to private schools, approximately twenty-five thousand naira because partial funding comes from the Federal Government. The Federal schools generally have good reputations and tend to be viewed as elite owing to their admissions being based on annual national merit exams.

==== Teacher qualifications at federal schools ====
Teachers who want to teach in Nigerian schools must have either a National Certificate in Education, a bachelor's degree in education, or a bachelor's degree in a subject field combined with a postgraduate diploma in education.

=== State-sponsored secondary schools ===
State-owned secondary schools are funded by the respective state government and are not comparable to Federal government colleges. Although, education is supposed to be free in the majority of the state-owned institutions, students are required to purchase books, uniforms and pay for miscellaneous things costing them an average of fifty thousand naira in one academic year. Some state-owned secondary schools were once regarded as elite colleges because of the historically high educational standard and alums who have become prominent citizens and successful in various careers. However, the ranking of these institutions has since declined for myriad reasons, including budget constraints and the emergence of privately owned institutions that compete for staff and students.

==== Teacher qualifications at state schools ====
Teachers in state-owned institutions usually have a National Certificate of Education or a bachelor's degree, but this is not always the case and varies widely between regions, states, and even local areas for reasons which include availability of qualified teachers willing to work in certain areas as well as remuneration rates. Many state-run schools are understaffed due to low state budgets, lack of incentives, and irregularities in payment of staff salaries. As a result, many state secondary schools in Nigeria are staffed by unqualified teachers who are unable to educate or motivate their students properly.

=== Private, religious, and independent secondary schools ===
Private secondary schools in Nigeria tend to be quite expensive, with average fees ranging from a few hundred thousand naira to several million naira annually. Fees have also been increasing rapidly, by as much as 50-70% in 2024. At least one school reportedly charges 30 million naira.

These schools tend to have smaller classes (approximately 10 to 20 students per class), modern equipment, and a better learning environment. As a result of larger budgets, these institutions can pay better salaries and attract teachers possessing at least a bachelor's degree in a specific course area and are sometimes supported with continuing education of workshops or short-term programs regularly.

Religious and parochial schools such as those affiliated with Catholic, Methodist, and Baptist churches were historically less expensive than other private schools. However, schools sponsored by some recently established denominations and independent churches can be quite expensive.

== Promotional examinations ==
With the introduction of the 6-3-3-4 education system in Nigeria, students would spend six years in primary school, three years in junior secondary school, three years in senior secondary school, and four years in a tertiary institution. But under review, the six years spent in primary school and the three years spent in junior secondary school are merged to form the nine years in the 9-3-4 system. Altogether, the students must spend a minimum period of six years in Secondary School. During this period, students are expected to spend three years in Junior Secondary School and three years in Senior Secondary School.

The General Certificate of Education Examination (GCE) was replaced by the Senior Secondary Certificate Examination (SSCE). The SSCE is conducted at the end of the Secondary School studies in May/June. The GCE is conducted in October/November as a supplement for those students who did not get the required credits from their SSCE results. The standards of the two examinations are basically the same. A body called West African Examination Council (WAEC) conducts both the SSCE and GCE. A maximum of nine and a minimum of seven subjects are registered for the examination by each student, with Mathematics and English Language taken as compulsory.

A maximum of nine grades are assigned to each subject from: A1, B2, B3 (Equivalent to Distinctions Grade); C4, C5, C6 (Equivalent to Credit Grade); D7, E8 (Pass Grade); F9 (Fail Grade). Credit grades and above are considered academically adequate for entry into any University in Nigeria. In some study programs, many universities may require higher grades to get admission.

The federal government's education policy is adopted by all secondary schools in Nigeria. Six years of elementary school are followed by six years of secondary school. Junior Secondary school consists of JSS1, JSS2, and JSS3, which are equivalent to the 7th, 8th, and 9th Grade, while the Senior Secondary school consists of SS1, SS2, and SS3, which are equivalent to the 10th, 11th, and 12th Grade. The Senior Secondary School Examination (SSCE) is taken at the end of SS3. The West African Examination Council (WAEC) administers both exams. Three to six months after a student takes the SSCE examination, they receive an official transcript from their institution. This transcript is valid for one year, after which an Official transcript from the West African Examination Council is issued.

The National Examination Council is another examination body in Nigeria; it administers the Senior Secondary School Examination (SSCE) in June/July. The body also administers the General Certificate of Education Examination (GCE) in December/January. Students often take both WAEC and NECO examinations in SSS 3.

== A-levels in Nigeria ==
The Interim Joint Matriculation Board (IJMB) is an advanced-level education programme designed for students intending to pursue university without taking the JAMB Joint Admissions and Matriculation Board exams, either for undergraduate study or for direct entry. The IJMB examination is primarily for Advanced Level subjects for Direct Entry into 200 level in the Universities. The syllabus for the IJMB Examination is compiled in line with international educational standards and the admission requirements of various universities in Nigeria and overseas. It runs for 9 months and has 2 semesters.

IJMB is a national educational programme approved by the Federal Government and coordinated nationwide by Ahmadu Bello University, Zaria, with affiliated Study Centres across the country. The IJMB programme provides a platform for successful IJMB candidates to secure direct admission to the 200 Level at Nigerian universities and abroad.

It is government-approved and has international recognition. It can be used to gain entry into the second year of any tertiary institution in Nigeria.

IJMBE is certified by Nigeria University Commission (NUC) and Joint Admission Matriculation Board (JAMB) as an A'level programme that qualifies candidates to secure direct admission into 200 Level in the Universities upon successful completion of the IJMB programme. For effective coverage of the IJMB syllabus, a minimum of 8-10 lecture hours per week is recommended, IJMB practical and field works included. The IJMB syllabus may be revised every eight years.

The Joint Universities Preliminary Examinations Board (JUPEB) is another advanced-level program that enables students to gain admission to the 200-level in most universities in Nigeria through direct entry (DE). The programme runs for about 8 months, and admission is through the JAMB Joint Admissions and Matriculation Board, even though students in this programme do not need to sit for the Unified Tertiary Matriculation Examination (UTME).

JUPEB is government-approved, and the board is responsible for accrediting universities that can run the programme. Most universities in Nigeria accept JUPEB for direct entry admissions, but not all are accredited to run the programme.

== Tertiary education ==
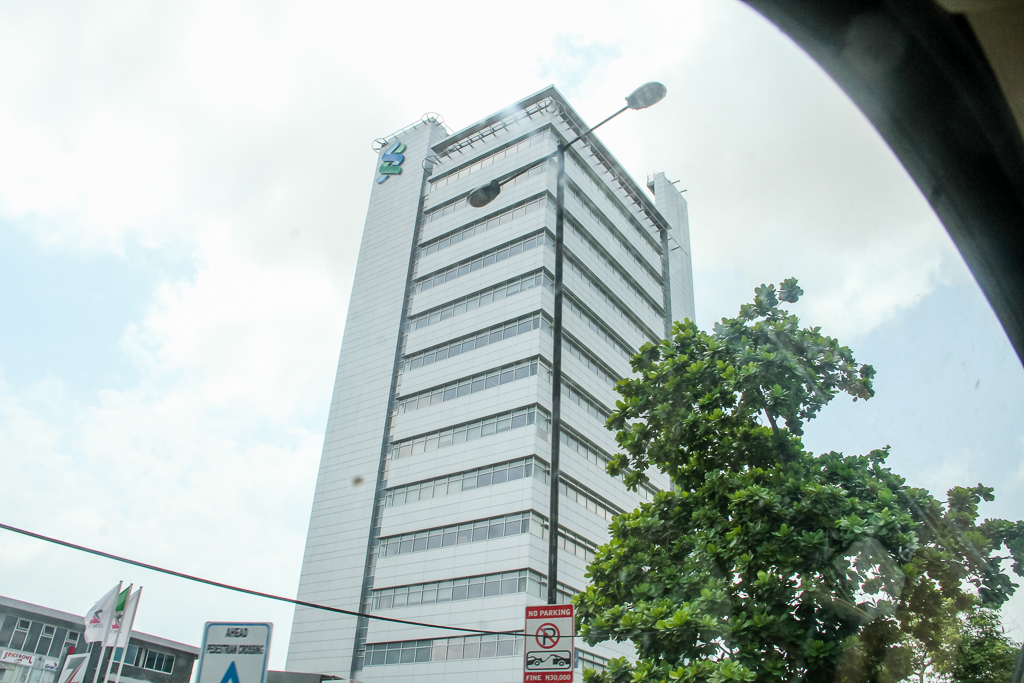
Open University of Nigeria, Lagos

The government has majority control of university education. Tertiary education in Nigeria consists of Universities (Public and Private), Polytechnics, Monotechnics, and Colleges of education. The country has a total number of 153 universities registered by NUC among which federal and state government own 40 and 45 respectively while 68 universities are privately owned as at August, 2017. According to the Federal Ministry of Education, Nigeria has 43 approved federal universities, 47 approved state universities, 75 approved private universities, 28 approved federal polytechnics, 43 approved state polytechnics, 51 approved private polytechnics, 22 approved federal colleges, 47 approved state colleges and 26 approved private colleges. To increase the number of universities in Nigeria, the Federal Government gave 9 new private universities their licenses in May 2015. The names of the universities that got licenses in Abuja included, Augustine University, Ilara, Lagos; Chrisland University, Owode, Ogun State; Christopher University, Mowe, Ogun State; Hallmark University, Ijebu-Itele, Ogun State; Kings University, Ode-Omu, Osun State; Michael and Cecilia Ibru University, Owhrode, Delta State; Mountain Top University, Makogi/Oba Ogun state; Ritman University, Ikot-Epene, Akwa- Ibom State and Summit University, Offa, Kwara State.

The Federal Executive Council of the President Muhammadu Buhari government approved the establishment of 20 new private universities on February 3, 2021, in Nigeria. The list and location of the newly approved Universities and their locations are as follows: 1. Mudiame University, Irrua, Edo State 2. Claretian University, Nekede, Imo State 3. Ave-Maria University, Piyanko, Nasarawa State 4. Topfaith University, Mkpatak, Akwa Ibom State 5. Maranatha University, Mgbidi, Imo State 6. Al-Istqama University, Sumaila, Kano State 7. Havilla University, Nde-Ikom, Cross River State 8. Karl Kumm University, Vom, Plateau State 9. Nok University, Kachia, Kaduna State 10. Thomas Adewumi University, Oko Irese, Kwara State 11. Ahman Pategi University, Patigi, Kwara State 12. Anan University, Kwall, Plateau State 13. Capital City University, Kano, Kano State 14. Edusoko University, Bida, Niger State 15. James Hope University, Agbor, Delta State 16. Khadija University, Majia, Jigawa State 17. Maryam Abacha, American University of Nigeria, Kano, Kano State 18. Mewar International University, Nigeria, Masaka, Nasarawa State 19. Philomath University, Kuje, Abuja 20. University Of Offa , Offa, Kwara State.

First-year entry requirements for most universities in Nigeria include: a minimum of SSCE/GCE Ordinary Level Credits, with a maximum of two sittings; and a minimum cut-off mark score in the Joint Admissions and Matriculation Board (JAMB) entrance examination of 180 out of 400. Candidates with minimum of Merit Pass in National Certificate of Education (NCE), National Diploma (ND) and other Advanced Level Certificates minimum qualifications with minimum of 5 O/L Credits are given direct entry admission into the appropriate undergraduate degree programs.

Students with required documents typically enter university from age 17-18 onwards and study for an academic degree. Historically, universities are divided into several tiers.

=== First-generation universities ===
The history of university education in Nigeria can be traced to the Elliot Commission of 1943, which culminated in the establishment of University College, Ibadan in 1948.

Five of these universities were established between 1948 and 1965, following the recommendation of the Ashby Commission set up by the British Colonial Government to study the necessity of university education for Nigeria. These universities are fully funded by the federal government. They were established primarily to meet a need for qualified personnel in Nigeria and to set basic standards for university education. These universities have continued to play their roles in the production of qualified personnel and the provision of standards, which have helped to guide the subsequent establishments of other generations of universities in Nigeria. Universities in this tier are the following:

- University of Ibadan
- University of Nigeria, Nsukka
- Obafemi Awolowo University
- Ahmadu Bello University Zaria
- University of Lagos

=== Second-generation universities ===
With the increasing number of qualified students seeking university education in Nigeria and the growing need for scientific and technological developments, establishing more universities has become imperative. Between 1970 and 1985, 12 additional universities were established across the country.

- University of Calabar
- University of Ilorin
- University of Jos
- University of Maiduguri
- University of Port Harcourt
- Bayero University, Kano

=== Third generation universities ===
The third generation universities were established between 1980 and early 1990 to address special areas of technological and agricultural demand response to a nationally acclaimed need for skilled workforce. These universities are:

- Federal University of Technology, Owerri
- University of Agriculture, Makurdi
- Federal University of Technology, Yola
- Federal University of Technology, Akure
- Federal University of Technology, Bauchi
- Federal University of Technology, Minna
- Federal University of Agriculture, Abeokuta

=== State universities ===
Pressure from qualified students in each state who could not readily gain admission to any of the Federal Universities continued to mount on the State Governments. It became imperative for some state governments to invest in establishing universities.

=== Private universities ===
Private universities are institutions owned, managed, and run by private individuals and organisations. The Federal Government enacted a law in 1993 allowing the private sector to establish universities in accordance with government-prescribed guidelines.

The typical duration of undergraduate programs at Nigerian universities largely depends on the field of study. For example, social sciences/humanities-related courses are 4 Years, I.C.T related courses are 4 years, engineering/technology-related courses are 5 Years, pharmacy courses are 5 Years. Law courses are 5 Years, each with two semester sessions per year. Medicine (Vet/Human) degrees take 6 Years and have longer sessions during the year.

On February 3, 2021, the Nigerian Universities Commission approved an additional 20 universities, bringing the total to 99 approved universities in Nigeria.

== Vocational education ==
Within education in Nigeria, vocational training and informal education dominate as the central forms of sharing regionally specific knowledge. Administration of vocational education in the country is overseen by the National Board for Technical Education. In the early 1980s, as a result of high unemployment rates for school graduates, the Nigerian government placed a new emphasis on making vocational programs available to students. The most significant plan for improvement was the Master Plan for 2001-2010 for the development of the National Vocational Education system developed by the Federal Ministry of Education in 2000. Current challenges to the enforcement of these systems include a shortage of teachers, poor data on labour market needs, and outdated curricula and technology at vocational training centers.

As it stands now, students in Nigeria can pursue either a National Technical Certificate or an Advanced National Technical Certificate. Administration of these certificates is overseen by the National Business and Technical Examinations Board (NABTEB). In addition to institutional forms of vocational education, the Nigerian government allows and encourages participation in apprenticeships. These apprenticeships are instrumental in instilling the skills involved in a specific trade, but they also instill a commitment to community values, including patience, determination, and respect. While child labour laws prevent children younger than 15 from entering the workforce, children less than 15 years of age are able to legally procure apprenticeships.

While efforts are being made to improve the quality and availability of vocational education, many policy-oriented approaches have been blocked by a small number of politicians. The failures to properly implement a national approach to workers' education have roots in the political instability of the country. To this end, many academics have questioned whether politicians are attempting to intentionally subjugate the working class through a lack of educational qualifications.

== Informal education and literacy programmes ==
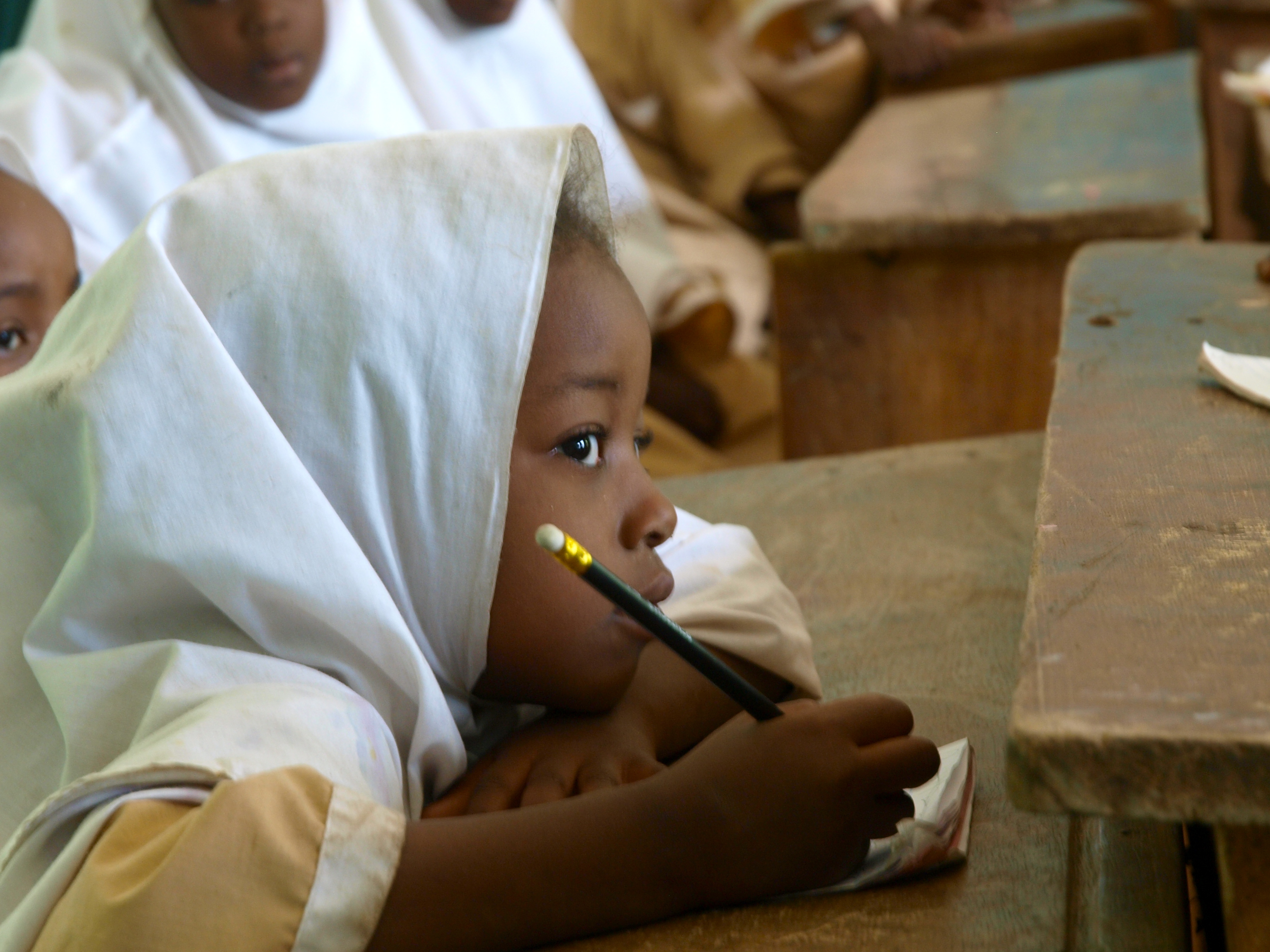
School age children participating in literacy education

Informal modes of education have long formed the foundation of tertiary education in Nigeria and remain at play today. These programmes and structures are difficult to study and assess unanimously as they are decentralized and unique in their missions and practices. Many academics have concluded that an overall lack of funding and centralization has significantly hindered the quality, funding, and implementation of literacy programmes for both school-age children and adults.

However, many have succeeded in promoting employment and increasing economic mobility for those who have used the programmes. In addition to vocational apprenticeships, the Nigerian government and various NGOs have introduced communal- based strategies to increase literacy rates among both children and adults. One such example is the Centre of Excellence for Literacy and Literacy Education (CELLE), an NGO committed to accelerating national development through literacy education. In 1992, CELLE launched the Premier Reading Club (PRC), which is a nationally organized club with defined structure and methods for teaching children and adults to read and share their ideas. These programmes have achieved varying levels of success with the primary challenge being that funding is difficult to come by. Formal and informal literacy education in Nigeria received a significant boost under the colonial rule of Britain, but since independence in 1960, educational funding across the board has been lacking. Informal education has also aimed at addressing issues other than illiteracy.

Calls to incorporate informal HIV/AIDS education into the prison education system have been frequent and met with limited and varied responses. This population needs this education, as inmates are not exposed to standard TV and print media campaigns addressing the issue.

From a psychological perspective, much of the informal education of adults is based on Western psychological and social science research. However, growing academic movements are seeking to contextualize and build upon these western-based ideals for the sake of social betterment in Nigeria and in developing nations around the world.

Overall, the informal education system in Nigeria is nuanced and complex. Despite strong support for investment in adult literacy and vocational programmes, small groups of politicians and funding constraints have stalled the implementation of many such programmes. One study regarding the involvement of the national government in education and literacy programmes concluded that the high illiteracy rates in Nigeria were significantly related to the government's lack of commitment towards its standardized education policies.

== Female education ==
Female literacy rate in Nigeria by state in 2013: > 90% 80–90% 70–80% 60–70% 50–60% 35–50% < 35%

Education has been recognized as a basic human right since the 1948 adoption of the Universal Declaration of Human Rights. A positive correlation exists between girls' enrollment in primary school and both the gross national product and life expectancy. Because of this correlation, enrollment in schools represents the largest component of societal investment into human capital. Rapid socioeconomic development of a nation has been observed to depend on the calibre of women and their education in that country. Women's participation in education has been increasing; several motivations are used by NGO, local, state, and federal governments to encourage more women to pursue education. Women can now be seen in various high-profile careers. That being said, there are still many challenges preventing gender equality in the Nigerian education system. There is a significant bias against female involvement in specific academic disciplines, with studies showing the existence of gender-based stereotyping of students by teachers in secondary schools. The most dominant barriers are currently teen pregnancy, teen marriage, religious beliefs, poverty, and poor school facilities. In recent years, the rise of militant groups such as the Boko Haram, Bandits, Unknown Gunmen, and the Niger Delta militancy has contributed to destabilisation of the education system.

In a bid to improve female education for girls, the UNICEF initiated some projects in Nigeria. One of them is The Girls' Education Project initiated through a Memorandum of Understanding signed in December 2004 between the United Nations Children's Fund and the United Kingdom Department for International Development. The Girls' Education Project Memorandum of Understanding focused on supporting Federal Government of Nigeria initiatives that aim at achieving Universal Primary Education and Universal Basic Education as stipulated in the six Education for All goals. The Girls' Education Project 3 Cash Transfer Programme (GEP3-CTP) was designed as a social protection programme to mitigate the impact of poverty on girls' enrolment and school attendance in Niger and Sokoto States. The programme was implemented for two years (2014 to 2016). UNICEF has commissioned Capra International to assess the programme against five criteria to understand how the programme was implemented, the impacts achieved, and identify lessons that can inform further implementation of the Cash Transfer Programme.

One of the greatest Nigerian educators hailed from Edo State, Nigeria. She was Catherine Ndidi Edi-Osagie (Nee Irabor) was born in Minna Nigeria on January 15th 1934 to the family of Pa Jacob Uwadia Irabor and Mrs. Grace Omokpolo Irabor both of Igbanke in Edo State, Nigeria. She had her early education at St. Peters Anglican School in Minna, and later attended Government Women's Teachers Training College in Enugu, and WTC in Enugu and Kabba. Mrs. Catherine Edi-Osagie met and married Edward Okenyenbuno Osajie (of Ottah, Nigeria) in 1959; both her and her husband were young teachers at the time. Mrs Edi-Osagie went on to attain a Diploma in Education from the university College Ibadan, Nigeria in 1963 (all while starting a young family). Catherine Edi-Osagie continued her education at the University of Nigeria Nsukka where she obtained a Senior Diploma in Education. In 1977 Mrs Catherine Edi-Osagie proceeded to the United Kingdom for further education. She earned a Senior Diploma in Special Education from Moray College in Edinburgh, Scotland. She capped her educational accomplishments by obtaining both a Bachelors and a Masters Degree in Educational Psychology at the Radcliffe University College in Cardiff Wales. During her long and illustrious career, Mrs. Catherine Edi-Osagie held many professional positions which included the position of Teacher at Domestic Center in Minna, Nigeria; Teacher at Provincial Girls School Kontagora, Nigeria; Teacher at CMS School, Igbodo, Nigeria; Headmistress at CMS School Igbanke, Nigeria, Teacher/House Mistress at Anglican Girls Grammer School, Asaba Nigeria; Teacher at Anglican Girls Grammar School Benin-City Nigeria; Teacher at Edo College Benin-City, Nigeria; and finally ending her career at the Bendel State Ministry of Education as an Assistant Chief Inspector Of Education, a position she held until her retirement in 1994. Mrs Catherine and her husband had six children Ethel, Raymond, Edmond, Sidney and Kate a son innocent died at infancy); all the children went on to exel in different walks of life. Catherine Edi-Osagie also ran orphanages, and raised many other children in her home that were not hers biologically; she placed a high premium on having a united family built on the foundation of Christianity. Mrs. Catherine Edi-Osagie devoted her life to the service of humanity. She was the founder of the Igbanke Womens Progressive Union, and influencial/highly respected member of the male dominated Igbanke club. She was a lifetime Vice President of the Nigerian Red Cross Society, Secretary-General of the YWCA, Juvenile Court Judge, Member of the Bendel State Hospital Management Board, devoted member of St. Mathews Anglican Church in Benin-City. Mrs Edi-Osagie President of Life in the Savior Outreach Ministries, member of the Mothers Union of St. Mathews Cathedral Church in Benin-City, and founding member of the Bendel Society for the Mentally and Physically Handicapped. She was instrumental to starting the first Special Ed classes in Bendel State Schools. Mrs. Edi-Osagie was instrumental to getting the first public library built in her hometown of Igbanke, Nigeria. On the 31st of December 2002, in recognition of her lifetime of achievements, Mrs. Catherine Edi-Osagie was bestowed with the Chieftaincy title of Enyi Ka Nwanne 1 of Obiagu, Abia State, Nigeria. Mrs. Catherine Edi-Osagie died in a car accident on February 16th, 2008 at the age of 74. she is buried in the yard of her home in Benin-City, Nigeria †

GEP3-CTP was a two-year unconditional cash transfer programme (September 2014 - August 2016) with the primary objective of increasing girls' enrolment, retention, and completion of basic education in selected schools in Niger and Sokoto States. The impact evaluation of GEP3-CTP was carried out by Capra International, a division of Ghubril Ltd, in two stages from October 2016 to March 2017. The first stage was the Evaluability Assessment of GEP3-CTP, and the second stage was the Impact Assessment of GEP3-CTP.

== Secondary education in Nigeria's rural areas ==
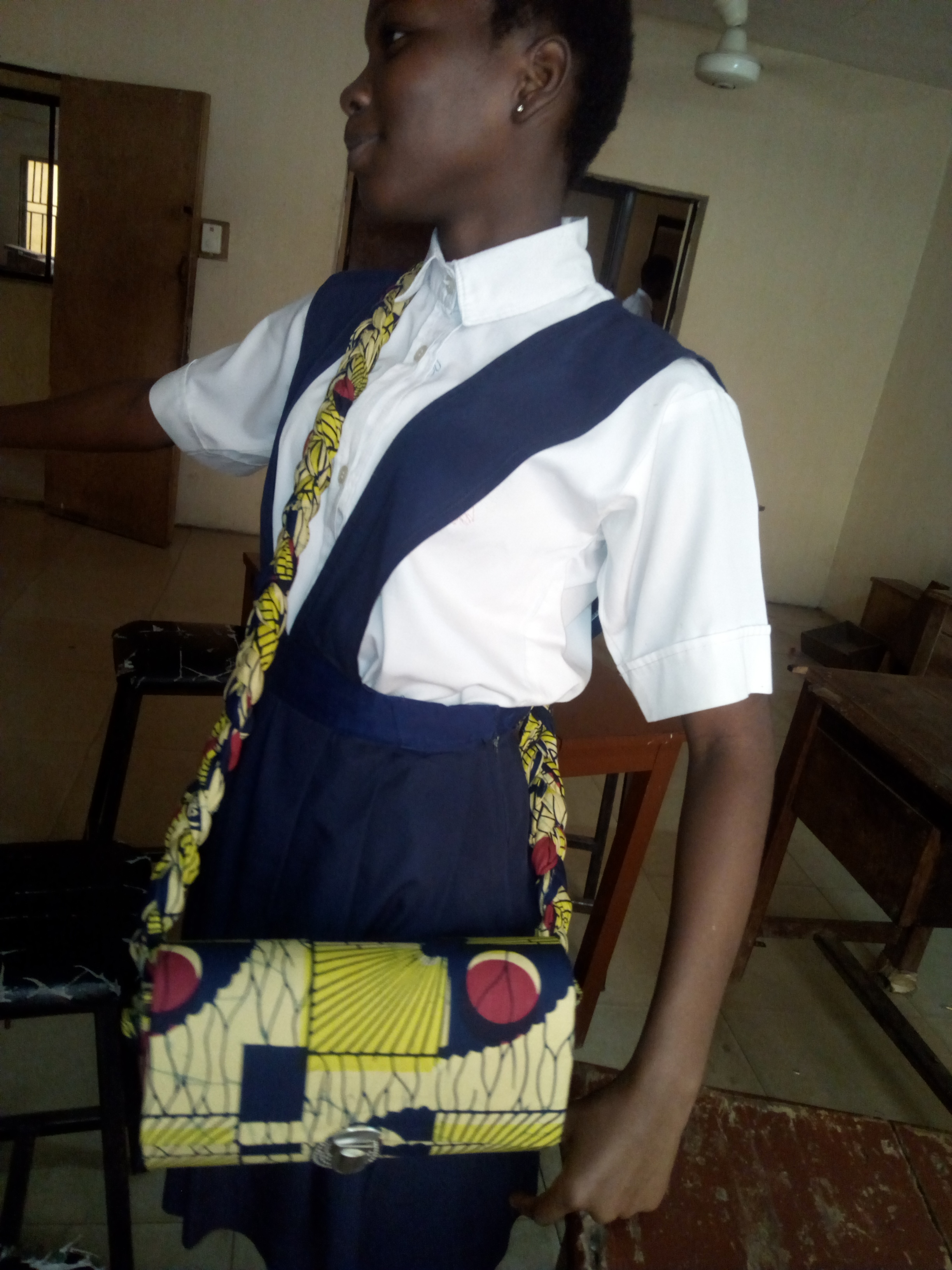
A teenager at school

In Nigeria's national policy on education (FRN 1998), it is stated that the federal government has adopted education as an instrument for effecting national development in all areas of the nation. Education in rural Nigeria is characterized by poor infrastructure, insufficient academic staff, insecurity, and non-payment of staff, among other challenges.

Education is fundamental to growth and development and serves as a critical indicator for measuring progress on the development agenda. However, rural schools in Nigeria are in a "sorry state", and it is common knowledge that a majority of the population in developing countries like Nigeria lives in rural areas, which the government largely neglects in terms of development.

== Literacy in Nigeria ==
Although most of Nigeria's literacy challenges are in the northern region, the country's literacy rate remains significantly low, with only 62.02% of adults (ages 15 and above) literate as of 2018. The low literacy rate in Nigeria is exacerbated by regional disparities especially in the North-East and North-West, which has the highest numbers of out-of-school children, primarily due to poverty, insecurity, and cultural factors like child marriage and religious extremism. In the South, while the situations are much better, significant challenges persist, with millions of children still out of school.

Efforts to improve literacy are ongoing, with stakeholders advocating for policies that enhance multilingual education and access to resources like books and libraries. According to the Nigerian federal government as of 2022 Nigeria's illiteracy rate is now at 31% bringing the literacy rate at 69%. As of 2024, the Nigerian government is actively addressing its literacy challenges through several initiatives aimed at improving both general and digital literacy levels. On traditional literacy, the government has emphasized its commitment to raising literacy rates among both youth and adults. The administration of President Bola Tinubu has prioritized this issue, with policies aimed at enhancing functional literacy and creating equitable access to education for all citizens. This includes a strong focus on eliminating barriers to education, particularly for vulnerable populations. The government has also partnered with UNESCO to support mass literacy programs and review non-formal education policies.

Nigeria has set an ambitious target of achieving 95% digital literacy by 2030. This is seen as a crucial step toward boosting employment opportunities and reducing poverty. Efforts include training programs for youths in digital skills such as content creation and digital marketing, but there are concerns that the country's high out-of-school population may hinder the full realization of this target.

=== Literacy rates by state ===
Female literacy rates by states by the National Bureau of Statistics, Nigeria

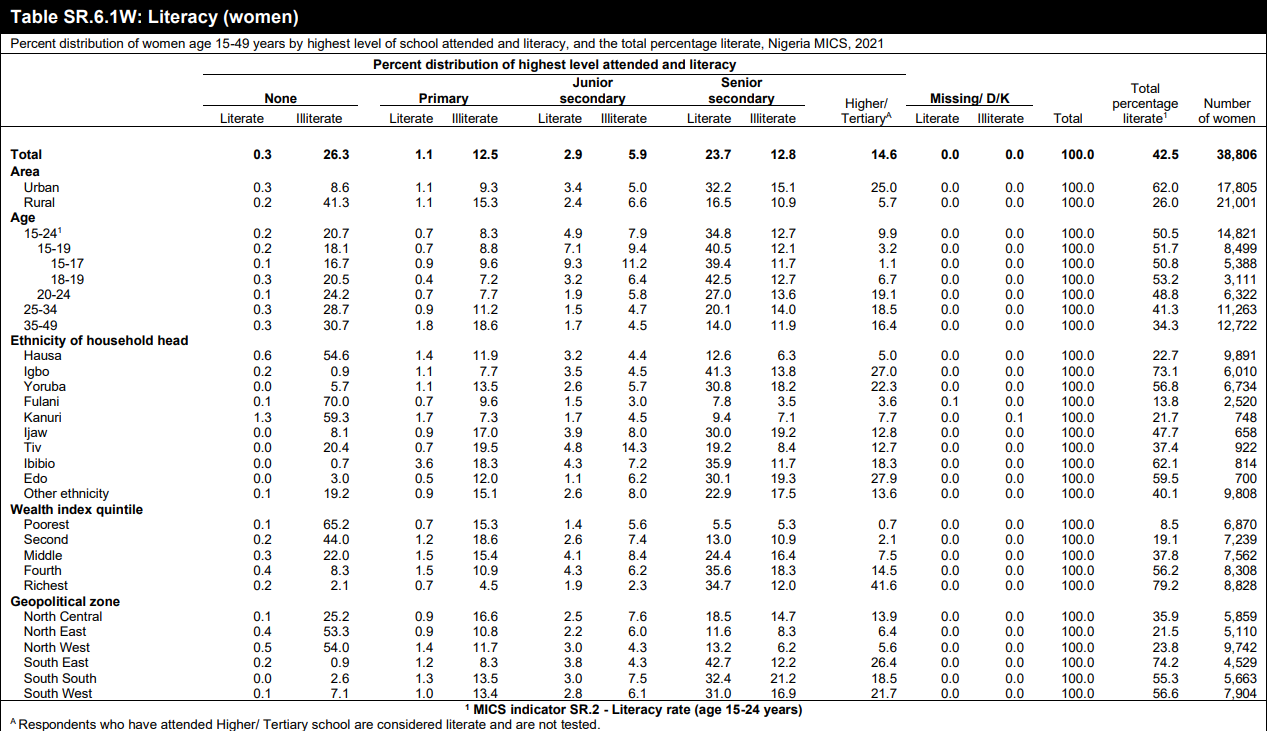
2021 Nigerian women's literacy rate by NBS

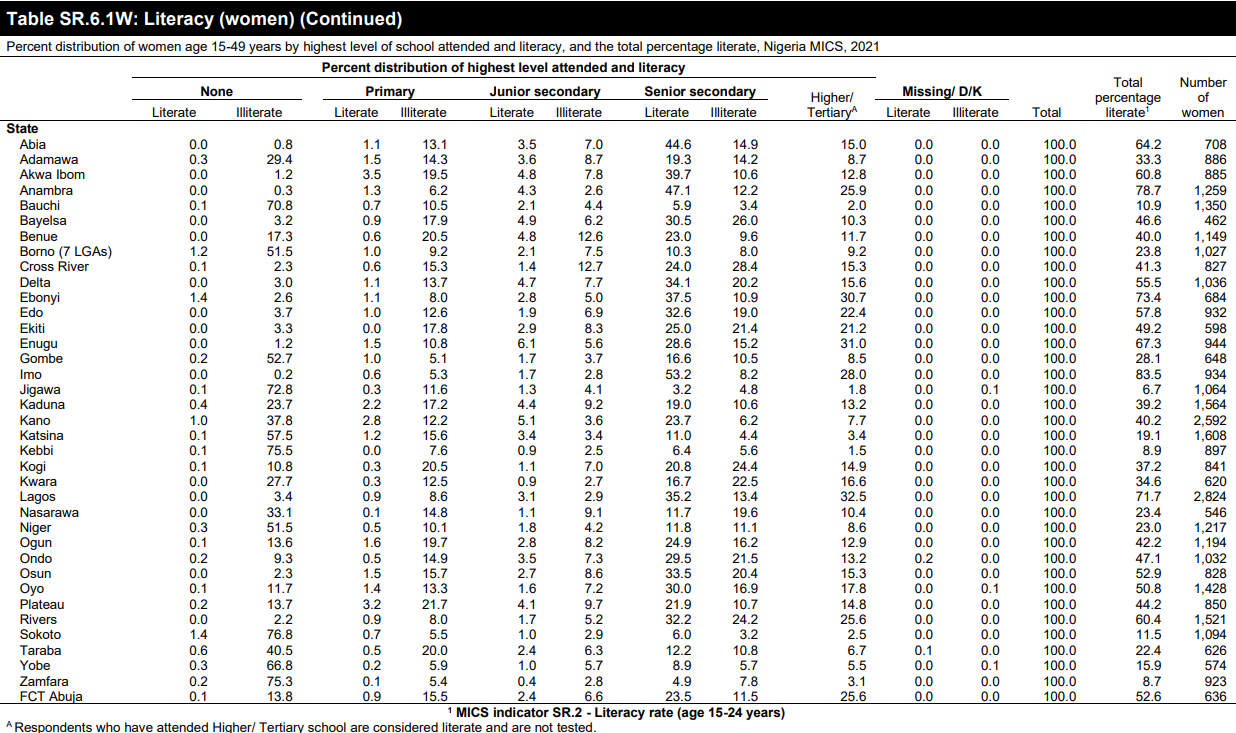
2021 Nigerian women's literacy rate by NBS

Male literacy rates by states the National Bureau of Statistics, Nigeria

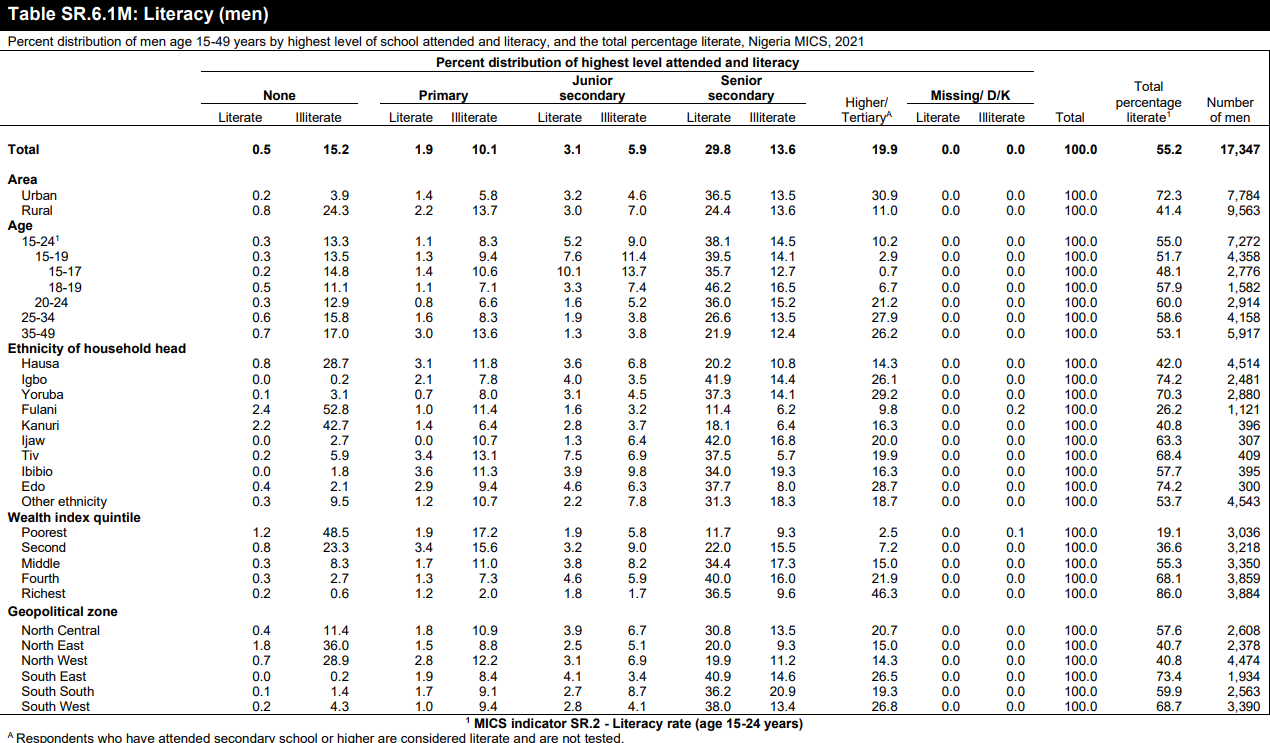
2021 Nigerian men's literacy rate by NBS

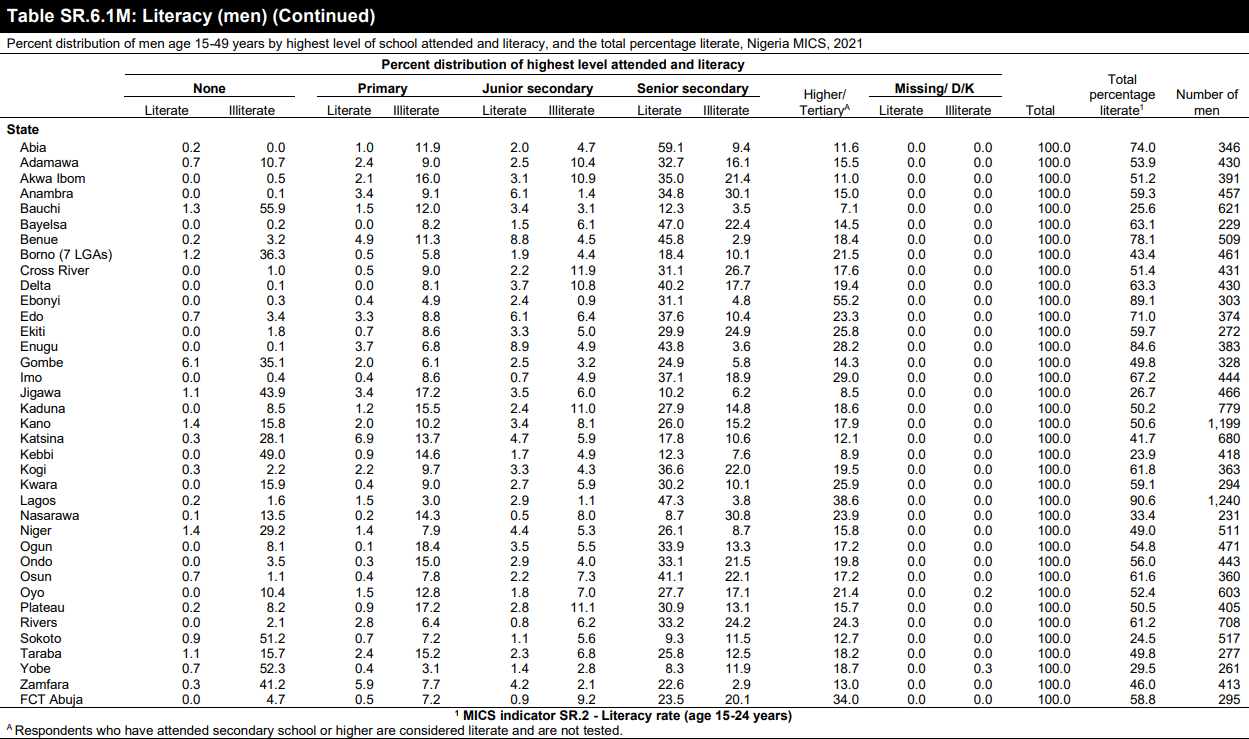
2021 Nigerian men's literacy rate by NBS

== See also ==
- List of Nigerian universities
- National Universities Commission
- List of polytechnics in Nigeria
- list of colleges of education in Nigeria
- Schools in Nigeria
- Digital divide in Nigeria
- Confraternities in Nigeria
- Tertiary Education Trust Fund
