= Examination Boards in Nigeria =

Examination Boards in Nigeria (also regarded as examination bodies) are organizations that are given the mandate to conduct placement examinations in form of learning assessment for Nigerian students. This assessment aims at admitting the students into different institutions of learning at different levels of the Nigerian educational system. The major educational boards in Nigeria are Joint Admissions and Matriculation Board (JAMB), National Examination Council (NECO), West African Examination Council (WAEC) and the National Business and Technical Examination Board (NABTEB), and National Board for Arabic and Islamic Studies (NBAIS).

Others include International General Certificate of Secondary Education (IGCSE). The National Board for Educational Measurement is a professional organization which oversees the assessment processes to ensure that the assessment process is just. It is an organization which checks the activities of the examination boards. This body also is involved in educational measurement by measuring how standardized tests are and the viability of performance-based assessments. They also help the Nigerian examination boards in assessment design and implementation.

== National Examination Council (NECO) ==
The National Examination Council (NECO) was established in 1999 for the conduct of the senior School Certificate Examinations (SSCE) in the nation. At the period of its establishment it was expected that it will be a reliable examination body which will be reputable and acceptable both nationally and internationally. This examination board organizes examinations of two categories annually, the school based examination and another for private candidates.

== National Business and Technical Examination Board (NABTEB) ==
The National Business and Technical Examination Board was set up to introduce a craft level examination in Nigeria in 1992.

== International General Certificate of Secondary Education (IGCSE) ==
International General Certificate of Secondary Education (IGCSE) is an international examination, an equivalence of the British examination, General Certificate of Secondary Education (GCSE) also offered by the Nigerian students. it is popularly regarded as Cambridge Examination in Nigeria based on the fact that the examination is an initiative of the University of Cambridge. the examination is reckoned with by majority of international institutions. This examination is also written by the Nigerian students who want to pursue their education in international settings.
