= Federal Ministry of Education (Nigeria) =

Nigerian ministry responsible for education

- Coat of arms of Nigeria

Agency overview
- Jurisdiction: Government of Nigeria
- Headquarters: Federal Secretariat, Abuja
- Annual budget: ₦1.59 trillion (2024)
- Minister responsible: Dr. Maruf Olatunji Alausa
- Website: education.gov.ng

The Federal Ministry of Education is a part of the Federal Ministries of Nigeria. It regulates secondary and tertiary education in Nigeria. Its headquarters office is located at Block 5A (8th Floor), Federal Secretariat Complex, Shehu Shagari Way, Central Area, P.M.B. 146, Garki, Abuja.

== History ==
President Bola Tinubu appointed Tunji Alausa as minister of education on 23 October 2024.

== Mission ==
According to the ministry, its mission is "to use education as a tool for fostering the development of all Nigerian citizens to their full potentials, in the promotion of a strong, democratic, egalitarian, prosperous, indivisible and indissoluble sovereign nation under God."

== Organisation ==
Its functions include:

- Formulating a national policy on education.
- Collecting and collating data for purposes of educational planning and financing.
- Maintaining uniform standards of education throughout the country.
- Controlling the quality of education in the country through the supervisory role of the Inspectorate Services Department within the Ministry.
- Harmonizing educational policies and procedures of all the states of the federation through the instrumentality of the National Council on Education.
- Effecting co-operation in educational matters on an international scale.
- Developing curricula and syllabuses at the national level in conjunction with other bodies.

=== Parastatals include ===
- National Universities Commission (NUC), Abuja.
- National Commission for Almajiri and Out-of-School Children's Education (NCAOOSCE), Maitama, Abuja.
- National Board for Arabic and Islamic Studies

(NBAIS), Kaduna.

- National Board for Technical Education (NBTE), Kaduna.
- National Commission for Colleges of Education (NCCE), Abuja.
- Universal Basic Education Commission (UBEC), Abuja.
- National Commission for Nomadic Education (NCNE), Abuja.
- National Commission for Adult Education Mass Literacy and Non-Formal Education (NMEC), Abuja.
- Nigerian Educational Research and Development Council (NERDC), Sheda, FCT.
- Joint Admissions and Matriculation Board (JAMB), Bwari, Abuja.
- West African Examination Council (WAEC), Lagos.
- National Examination Council (NECO), Minna, State.
- National Business and Technical Examinations Board (NABTEB), Benin-city, Edo.
- National Institute for Educational Planning & Administration (NIEPA), Ondo.
- National Teachers Institute (NTI), Kaduna.
- Nigerian Mathematical Centre (NMC), Sheda, FCT.
- Nigerian French Language Village (NFV)Badagry, Lagos.
- Nigerian Arabic Language Village (NALV) Ngala, Borno.
- National Institute for Nigerian Languages (NINLAN) Aba, Abia.
- Tertiary Education Trust Fund (TET FUND), Abuja.
- National Library of Nigeria (NLN), Abuja.
- Teachers' Registration Council of Nigeria (TRCN), Abuja.
- Computer Professionals Registration Council of Nigeria (CPN), Lagos.
- Federal Scholarship Board, Abuja.
- Librarians' Registration Council of Nigeria (LRCN), Abuja
- National Open University of Nigeria

== See also ==
- Nigerian Civil Service
- List of polytechnics in Nigeria
- List of universities in Nigeria
