= Dibu Ojerinde =

Nigerian professor and educational administrator

Former Registrar of Joint Admissions and Matriculation Board, JAMB
- In office 10 April 2012 – 1 August 2016
- Succeeded by: Is-haq Oloyede

Registrar of National Examination Council, NECO
- In office 1999–2007

Registrar of National Board for Educational Measurement, NBEM

Personal details
- Born: Oyo State, Nigeria
- Party: Non-Partisan.

Dibu Ojerinde is a Nigerian professor of Tests and Measurement, educational administrator and a former Registrar of the Joint Admissions and Matriculation Board, JAMB.

== Life and career ==
He was born in Igboho, Oyo State, Nigeria. He attended Wesley College, Ibadan where he received the Teacher Grade II Certificate Examinations (TC II) in 1964. He later attended Adeyemi College of Education where he obtained the Nigeria Certificate in Education (N.C. E) in 1968. He proceeded to the prestigious Obafemi Awolowo University for a Bachelor of Science (B.sc) degree in education in 1973 and a Master of Education (M. Ed) in 1975. He later proceeded to Cornell University, Ithaca, New York where he received a Ph.D. in Educational measurement in 1978. He became Nigeria's first Professor of Tests and Measurement in October 1986.

He began his career as a secondary school teacher in 1965 at Laogun Methodist Grammar School. He left to Ibada Iseyin District Grammar School, Iseyin in 1970 and later College of Advanced Studies, Kano in 1975. He joined the services of Obafemi Awolowo University, Ile-Ife in 1973 and was appointed a Director of Institute of Education in the same university in 1984, a tenure that ended in 1990.

In 1990, Ojerinde was appointed as the Director of Monitoring and Evaluation, National Primary Education Commission (NPEC), a tenure that elapsed in 1991. He was then appointed as the Director and Consultant at Centre for Educational Measurement (CEM), Federal Ministry of Education. After his tenure in 1992, he was appointed as the Registrar of the National Board for Educational Measurement, NBEM. He held this position for 7 years (1992 – 1999). Shortly afterwards, Ojerinde was appointed as the Registrar of National Examination Council, NECO. He held this position for 8 years (1999 – 2007). In 2007, he was appointed as Registrar of the Joint Admissions and Matriculation Board (JAMB), a position he held for 5 years (2007-2012) and was reappointed on 10 April 2012.

Since March 2021, Dibu Ojerinde and four of his children have been facing corruption charges over an 18-count charge proferred against them by the Independent Corrupt Practices Commission bordering on alleged misappropriation of funds to the tune of 5.2 billion Naira while Ojerinde held office as JAMB Reigstrar.

== Professional association ==
- President of the International Association for Educational Assessment, IAEA.
- Vice president of the Association for Educational Assessment in Africa, AEAA.
- Member of the Nigerian Psychological Association, NPA
- Member of the Educational Studies Association of Nigeria.

== See also ==
- Joint Admissions and Matriculation Board, JAMB
