= Obioma =

- Language: Igbo

Origin
- Word/name: Nigeria
- Meaning: Good heart

Obioma // is a surname and unisex given name of Igbo origin meaning “good heart”.

== Given name ==
- Obioma Nnaemeka (born 1948), Nigerian-American academic
- Obioma Okoli (born 1992), Nigerian weightlifter

== Surname ==
- Chigozie Obioma (born 1986), Nigerian writer
- Godswill Obioma (born 1953), Nigerian academic
- Iheanacho Obioma, Nigerian politician
