= Nassir Ali Ahmed =

Nigerian politician

Member of the House of Representatives
- In office 2011 to 2015; 2015 to 2019 – 2019 to 2023
- Constituency: Kano State

Personal details
- Born: Kano State
- Occupation: Politician

Nassir Ali Ahmed, a politician from Kano State, Nigeria, served as the representative for the Nassarawa Federal Constituency in the National Assembly. He was elected as a member of the House of Representatives under the All Progressives Congress (APC) and held office from 2011 to 2015, 2015 to 2019, and 2019 to 2023.

== Early life and education ==
Ahmed was born on June 2, 1968, in Nasarawa Local Government Area of Kano State, Nigeria. He began his education in 1973 at Kano Capital School and completed it in 1980, earning a First School Leaving Certificate (FSLC). He obtained his Senior Secondary School Certificate in 1986 from Federal Government College Kano. Ahmed then earned a diploma in accounting from Ahmadu Bello University, Zaria, followed by a bachelor's degree in accounting from the University of Jos in 1992. In 1993, he received an MBA from Bayero University, Kano. He served as the vice chairman of the Local Content Committee.

== Political career ==
Ahmed served as the representative for the Nassarawa Federal Constituency in the National Assembly for three consecutive terms: from 2011 to 2015, 2015 to 2019, and 2019 to 2023. He was elected as a member of the House of Representatives under the All Progressives Congress (APC).
