= Charles O'Tudor =

Nigerian businessman (born 1971)

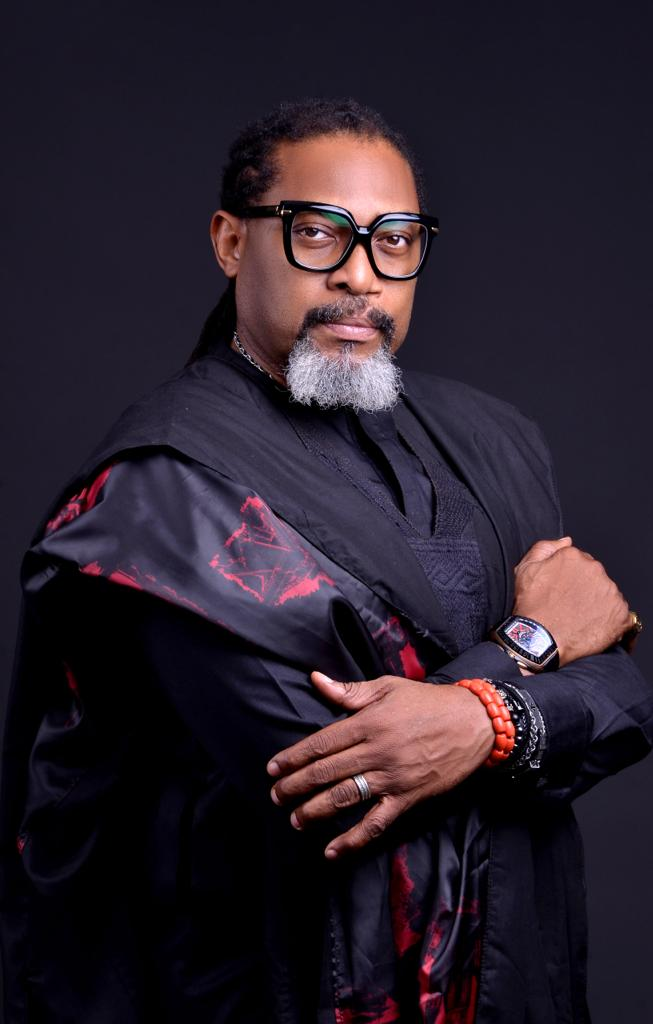
- Born: 20 June 1971 (age 55)
- Occupations: Strategist; public speaker; businessman
- Years active: 1990s–

Charles O'Tudor (born 20 June 1971) is a Nigerian brand strategist, public speaker, and businessman. He is the principal consultant for the Adstrat Branding Management Consortium.

== Education ==
O'Tudor was raised in Cross River State, Nigeria. He received his primary education at Command Children School in Lagos State and his secondary education at Command Secondary School, Ikeja, where he received his West African School Certificate (WASC) in 1987.

He holds a bachelor's degree in sociology from the University of Jos and is an alumnus of the University of the Witwatersrand, Johannesburg, South Africa, where he received certificates in management and measuring organizational strategies, product strategy, and brand management. He is an associate member of the Advertising Practitioners Council of Nigeria (APCON) and the Nigerian Institute of Public Relations (NIPR).

== Career ==
O'Tudor began his career in advertising and branding at Shops Bankole Sagie Advertising, where he worked for three years as an advertising executive. He later became deputy manager at Explicit Communications, where he managed multinational accounts, and subsequently worked as client services manager at Solutions. In 2001, he founded Adstrat BMC Ltd. and became its principal consultant.

O'Tudor served as the anchor of the Bank PHB-sponsored Intern TV Show.

O'Tudor founded the programme BrandsArise and has delivered lectures on branding at public events.

O'Tudor's standpoint on the "Rebranding Nigeria Campaign" (an initiative under Professor Dora Akunyili's Ministry of Information and Communications) was in his article titled "Rebranding Nigeria: Myths and Realities". In April 2005, Charles O'Tudor was appointed a member of the Lagos State Health Advocacy Implementation Committee, an initiative with the stated goal of raising awareness about the availability of free health care programmes.

== Honours ==
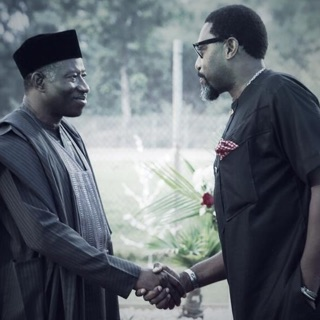
O'Tudor with President Goodluck Jonathan of Nigeria

Adstrat was endorsed by Lagos State Commissioner for Health Jide Idris in connection with the Health Advocacy Implementation Committee. O'Tudor later led a team of brand strategists involved in Cross River State's outdoor media project.

In 2005, he entered the "Junior Chamber International Hall of All Time Fame of Exemplary Leaders". He was also awarded The Brand Consultant of the Year Award by CITY People Magazine. He was appointed a member of the Obudu Ranch International Mountain Race Marketing Committee and Chairman of its Sub Committee on Brand Strategy, Marketing and Advertising by the Governor of Cross-River State, Senator Liyel Imoke. He is a member of the Board of Judges; a member of the Roundtable, and the Wits Business School Alumni Association, University of the Witwatersrand.

== Personal life ==
O’Tudor is married with three children: Vanzale, Dorothy and Daniel. In 2012, he changed his trademark look when he shaved his dreadlocks, which he had for decades.
