= Ebikibina Ogborodi =

Acting NECO registrar

Acting registrar of NECO
- In office 3 June 2021 – 16 July 2021
- Preceded by: Godswill Obioma
- Succeeded by: Ibrahim Dantani

Ebikibina John Ogborodi is currently the acting registrar of National Examination Council, NECO, since 3 June 2021 until July 2021.

== Early life and education ==
Ebikibina John Ogborodi is a native of Sagbama, Bayelsa State. In 1986, he graduated from University of Jos. In 1999, he received a master's degree in learning disability from the same University of Jos.

== Career ==
Ogborodi joined NECO in 1999. He has served as an acting director, examination development department, acting director, office of the registrar and general services and director, human resource management.

== Acting registrar of NECO ==
Ogborodi was appointed the acting registrar of NECO to replace Godswill Obioma who died on 31 May 2021. Until his appointment, he was the director, special duties.
