= West African Senior School Certificate Examination =

Examination

- Acronym: WASSCE
- Type: Standardized test
- Administrator: West African Examinations Council
- Skills tested: Core: English, Mathematics, Integrated Science, Social Studies; plus Electives
- Purpose: Secondary school graduation and university admission qualification
- Score range: A1 (Excellent) to F9 (Fail)
- Offered: Ghana, Nigeria, Sierra Leone, The Gambia, and Liberia
- Regions: Anglophone West Africa
- Languages: English
- Annual number of test takers: Over 2 million
- Prerequisites: Completion of senior secondary school (school candidates) or registration as a private candidate
- Website: waecgh.org (Ghana) / waecnigeria.org (Nigeria)

The West African Senior School Certificate Examination (WASSCE) is a type of standardized test in West Africa. Students who pass the exam receive a certificate confirming their graduation from secondary education. It is administered by the West African Examinations Council (WAEC). It is only offered to candidates residing in Anglophone West African countries. The academic school-leaving qualification awarded upon successful completion of the exams is the West African Senior School Certificate.

The WASSCE tests four core subjects—English Language, Mathematics, Civic Education, plus an additional core subject in the student's field (typically from the technology, science, art/humanities and commercial categories)— and three or four elective subjects.

== The examinations ==
There are two types of WASSCE examinations:

- WASSCE for School Candidates (conducted between May and June) is the Senior School Certificate Examination (SSCE) for school candidates. It is taken by final year students in senior secondary schools who are currently students of schools. This examination is offered during the summer (April to May), and the results are available by August.
- WASSCE for Private Candidates (Jan/Feb and Nov/Dec), also known as General Certificate Examination (GCE) or WAEC GCE, is a private examination where students do not need to be currently enrolled in a senior secondary school. This examination is offered during early spring (known as the first series) or autumn (known as the second series), and it is usually taken by secondary school leavers who want to correct deficiencies in their results. The results are available by March or December, usually 45 days after the last paper has been written.

== Grading system ==
Under the WAEC Marking and Grading Scheme, the letters A to F indicate how good a result is (while the numbers 1-9 are only used to rank the grades). In other words, To get an A1 in a subject, WASSCE Mathematics, for example, you need to score at least 75%.

Below is a breakdown of the grading system and the points to screen prospective first-year undergraduate students as of 2021.

Grade	Numerical Equivalent (%)	Points (%)	Remark
A1	75-100	8	Excellent
B2	70-74	7	Very Good
B3	65-69	6	Good
C4	60-64	5	Credit
C5	55-59	4	Credit
C6	50-54	3	Credit
D7	45-49	0	Pass
E8	40-44	0	Pass
F9	0-39	0	Fail

The least obtainable passing grade is a C6 (despite what the remarks in the table say). Candidates with a D7 and lower, especially in Mathematics and English language, are advised to retake the exam if they wish to pursue tertiary education in a degree-granting institution.

== Official guidelines for university admission ==
Candidates are advised that they will be required to satisfy not only the university's general entrance requirements but also the requirements of the particular faculty which they wish to enter and that these requirements vary considerably. Particulars of entrance requirements and exemption regulations may be obtained from the universities or professional bodies concerned.

=== Nigeria ===
Nigerian senior secondary school students can take either the WASSCE or the National Examination Council (NECO) exam.

Students who choose to study in Nigerian universities are required to sit the Unified Tertiary Matriculation Examination (UTME), an entrance examination administered by the state-owned Joint Admissions and Matriculation Board (JAMB).

=== United Kingdom ===
Universities in the United Kingdom may require candidates who did not obtain a credit in Mathematics and English language to complete a one-year foundation course or acceptable alternative. WASSCE and GCE is the NARIC equivalent of GCSE and A-Levels respectively.

=== Germany ===
Universities in Germany can matriculate students, if there are five independent subjects in the West African Senior School Certificate Examination with at least the grade "credit". One of these five subjects must be math or science. Additionally two languages must be among the five subjects, if humanities is the intended field of study at the German university. If the intended subject at the German university is outside the humanities, one language is sufficient among the five subjects graded with at least "credit".
