= Segun Aina =

Nigerian computer engineer and academic administrator

Registrar of the Joint Admissions and Matriculation Board
- Incumbent
- Assumed office 2026
- President: Bola Tinubu
- Preceded by: Is-haq Oloyede

Personal details
- Born: Segun Aina
- Education: University of Kent; Loughborough University; Lagos Business School
- Occupation: Academic, engineer, public administrator
- Known for: Registrar of JAMB; Professor of Computer Engineering

Segun Aina is a Nigerian computer engineer, academic, entrepreneur, and public administrator who serves as the Registrar of the Joint Admissions and Matriculation Board (JAMB). He was appointed to the position in 2026 by President Bola Tinubu.

Aina is a Professor of Computer Engineering at Obafemi Awolowo University, Ile-Ife, where he specialised in digital signal processing, artificial intelligence, pattern classification, and computer systems engineering. He became one of the youngest professors in his field in Nigeria after attaining professorship at the age of 39.

== Early life and education ==
Aina obtained a Bachelor of Engineering degree in Computer Systems Engineering from the University of Kent in the United Kingdom in 2008.

He later earned a Master of Science degree in Internet Computing and Network Security from Loughborough University in 2009, before obtaining a PhD in Digital Signal Processing from the same institution.

He also attended the Senior Management Programme at Lagos Business School, Pan-Atlantic University.

== Career ==
Aina began his academic career at Obafemi Awolowo University, where he lectured in the Department of Computer Engineering and later rose to the rank of professor.

His research interests include digital signal processing, machine learning, artificial intelligence, robotics, image processing, and human-computer interaction.

At OAU, he held several academic and administrative responsibilities, including serving as Chairman of the COREN Accreditation Committee and Academic Programme Coordinator at the TETFund Centre of Excellence in Digital Literacy and Emerging Technology.

In 2010, Aina co-founded Fluid Click Solutions Ltd, an information technology services and engineering project management company.

He also worked as a consultant for public and private institutions, including the Job Creation Unit in the Office of the Vice President of Nigeria, state governments, and national examination bodies.

Aina served on the pioneer Governing Council of Bamidele Olumilua University of Education, Science and Technology, Ikere-Ekiti, and chaired the Advisory Board of Queensland Academy, Lagos.

In 2026, President Bola Tinubu appointed Aina Registrar of the Joint Admissions and Matriculation Board (JAMB), succeeding Is-haq Oloyede.

== Professional memberships ==
Aina is a registered engineer with the Council for the Regulation of Engineering in Nigeria (COREN).

He is also a member of:

- Nigeria Computer Society
- Nigerian Society of Engineers
- Institute of Electrical and Electronics Engineers
- Institution of Engineering and Technology

== Publications and research ==
Aina has authored approximately 30 peer-reviewed journal articles and conference papers in the fields of computer engineering, digital systems, and artificial intelligence.

== Community engagement ==
Outside academia, Aina has been involved in youth development and educational advocacy initiatives. He serves as National Financial Secretary of the Otan Ayegbaju Progressive Union and convenes the DSA Initiative for the Support of Education and Entrepreneurship.
