= Ode Ojowu =

Ode Ojowu (born August 16, 1948) is a Nigerian economics professor and a Former Chief Executive of the National Planning Commission / Chief Economic Adviser to the President of the Federal Republic of Nigeria between 2004 and 2005.

== Career ==
Ojowu has held positions at the International Monetary Bank, the World Bank, and the United Nations Development Programme . He was a professor of economics at the University of Jos. He is a member of a newly formed Economic Advisory Council (EAC), that will be reporting directly to the Nigerian President.

In 2008 Ojowu was appointed head of the governing council of the Benue State University, he is currently serving his second term. He has published papers about the Nigerian economy.

In 2004, he was appointed Chief Economic Advisor to President Obasanjo of Nigeria.
