= Dibu =

Dibu may refer to:

- Emiliano "Dibu" Martínez (born 1992), Argentine goalkeeper
- Dibu, a.k.a. Mi familia es un dibujo, Argentine television series
  - Dibu 3, franchise sequel
- Dibu Ojerinde, Nigerian professor
- Soko Airport, by ICAO code DIBU
