= Ibrahim Wushishi =

Registrar of the national examination council of nigeria

Ibrahim Dantani Wushishi

Registrar and Chief Executive of the National Examinations Council
- Incumbent
- Assumed office 12 July 2021
- Preceded by: Ebikibina John Ogborodi (acting from 31 May 2021 to 12 July 2021) Godswill Obioma

Personal details
- Born: 5 April 1965 (age 61) Wushishi, Nigeria

Ibrahim Dantani Wushishi is the Registrar and Chief Executive of the National Examinations Council, he is appointed since 12 July 2021 but took the office on 16 July 2021. He took over from Ebikibina John Ogborodi who has been acting since the death of Godswill Obioma on 31 May 2021.

Ibrahim Dantani Wushishi, a professor of science education in Federal University of Technology of Minna in Nigeria, he is to serve for a tenure of five years. He became the first indigene of Niger State to Head the NECO since its formation.

He was born April 5, 1965, in Wushishi, Niger State, he works as lecturer in Usmanu Danfodio University, Sokoto and lastly in Federal University of Technology Minna.

He headed the Department of Science Education at Federal University of Technology Minna and Ibrahim Badamasi Babangida University, Lapai. He was also Sub-Dean School of Science and Science Education in the Federal University of Technology Minna.
