= Hannatu Salihu =

Commissioner of education, Niger State

Hannatu Jibrin Salihu was the commissioner of education, Niger State, Nigeria.

== Career ==
In 2020 she was invited to Singapore, where she delivered a speech on creativity and innovation in education in Nigeria.

As a Commissioner of Education, Salihu set plan after a sum of N86 million is approved by the state government to quarantine, provide feeding and repatriation of Almajirai pupils, after other state governments have return them to their various states of origin. She also made an announcement towards a fixed date to resume schools after a long lockdown during the COVID-19 pandemic in Nigeria.

On the 5th September 2022, she announced the alarming drop out of school among the children in Niger state. She raised the alarm during a presentation in Minna. The support from UNICEF and the board of education have helped the state government to face the challenges the action will cause.

On the 24th of February, which is the international education day, Hajia Hannatu Jubril, the commissioner of education for Niger state, reaffirmed that the state government is working hard to improve the quality and standard of education in the state in her opening speech. Additionally, she expressed concern on girl child education.

== Achievement ==
Her achievements are many as a commissioner of education, one of them is clearing the heavy and huge debts that is owed by Niger state government to all the examination bodies in Nigeria. In the new budget present by her on education to the state assembly of the state, an Amount of funds was Budget to clear the debts owed to WAEC, NECO, NABTEB and NIBASS. This debt was paid and signed to improve the quality of education in the state according to her promise to the people of the states.
