= Godswill Obioma =

Former NECO registrar

Godswill Obioma (Professor)

Registrar of NECO
- In office 14 May 2020 – 31 June 2021
- Preceded by: Abubakar Gana
- Succeeded by: Ebikibina Ogborodi

Personal details
- Born: 12 December 1953 (age 72) Abia state
- Died: 31 May 2021 Minna, Niger State, Nigeria
- Education: BSc, MEd and PhD at University of Nigeria, Nsukka NCE at Alvan Ikoku Federal College of Education

Godswill Ogbonnaya Obioma fnae fman fstan fcon fnatt fipma (12 December 1953 – 31 May 2021), was a Nigerian professor and the registrar of National Examination Council, NECO, until his death on 31 May 2021.

== Early life and education ==
Godswill Obioma is a native of Amaokpu, Nkpa, Bende Local Government Area, Abia State.

- In 1975, he graduated from Alvan Ikoku Federal College of Education where he studied mathematics and physics, graduating with distinction and as the overall best graduating student.
- In 1979, he graduated from the University of Nigeria, Nsukka where he studied mathematics and education, and was awarded the best graduating student.
- In 1982, he earned his master's degree in educational measurement and evaluation in the same university.
- In 1985, he graduated from the University of Nigeria, Nsukka with doctorate degree in the same field as his masters and also won the vice chancellor's award for the best doctoral dissertation.

== Academic career ==
In 1979, Obioma began his career as a Lecturer at the Department of Education, University of Nigeria, Nsukka, after being retained by the same institution when he graduated. He left the Nsukka in 1988 and moved to the University of Jos to take on the new role as Head of the Research Division of the Institute of Education.

In December 1991 at the age of 38, he was appointed a Professor of Mathematics Education and Evaluation at University of Jos. From 1993 till February 1994, Obioma was the Head of Department at the Department of Science, Mathematics and Technology.

== Government Career ==
After his position as the Head of Department at the Department of Science, Mathematics and Technology, Obioma left academia to public sector governing bodies. He first served as the special assistant on policy monitoring and evaluation to the military administrator of Abia State in 1994.

Obioma then served as the Director, Monitoring and Evaluation of the National Primary Education Commission, Kaduna from 1994 to January 2000. From 2000 to 2001 he was the director, monitoring and evaluation, Universal Basic Education programme, in Abuja. From 2001 July to September 2003, he served as the Director, Monitoring, Research and Statistics at National Board for Technical Education (NABTEB), in Benin City.

Obioma served as a Special Assistant to the Minister of Education in Abuja from 2003 until 2005. In March 2005, he took up the position of the Executive Secretary at Nigerian Educational Research and Development Council, NERDC Sheda, Abuja and served for two terms until March 2015. He joined the Independent National Electoral Commission, INEC, afterwards as the Resident Electoral Commissioner of Ebonyi State.

=== Registrar of NECO ===
Obioma was appointed by the president of Nigeria, Muhammadu Buhari as the registrar of National Examination Council, NECO for a five years tenure to replace Abubakar Gana from 14 May 2020. Unfortunately, he only served for one year before his demise.
