= Patricia Lar =

Nigerian professor of microbiology

Patricia Manko Lar
- Born: October 1964 (age 62); Langtang, Plateau State
- Citizenship: Nigeria
- Occupation: Academician

Academic background
- Education: Ahmadu Bello University, Zaria; University of Lagos

Academic work
- Discipline: Microbiologist
- Institutions: University of Jos

Patricia Manko Lar ( b. October 1, 1964) is a Nigerian professor of microbiology at the University of Jos. On 12 November 2026, she was appointed the 11th substantive vice-chancellor of the university and the first female since the inception of the university. She was formerly the acting vice-chancellor of Yakubu Gowon University.

== Early life and education ==
Lar was born on 1 October 1964 in Langtang, Plateau State, Nigeria. She obtained a Bachelor of Science degree in microbiology from Ahmadu Bello University, Zaria, in 1986. She bagged her master's degree in medical microbiology in 1989 and a doctorate in medical parasitology in 1998 from the University of Lagos.

== University administration ==
=== University of Abuja ===
In February 2025, President Bola Tinubu appointed Lar as acting vice-chancellor of the University of Abuja and she held the office for six months.

=== University of Jos ===
On 12 November 2026, the Governing Council of the University of Jos appointed Lar as the institution's 11th substantive vice-chancellor. The appointment was announced by the university's Pro-Chancellor and Chairman of Council, Senator Grace Folashade Bent, during a special meeting of the 15th Governing Council. Her appointment made her the first woman to serve as substantive vice-chancellor of the University of Jos. She succeeded Professor Tanko Ishaya.
