= National Examinations Council =

National Examinations Council may refer to:

- National Examination Council (Nigeria)
- Kenya National Examinations Council
- National Examinations Council of Tanzania

== See also ==
- National Board of Examinations (India)
- List of secondary school leaving qualifications
