= Musa Sani Nuhu =

Nigerian diplomat

His Excellency Ambassador Musa Sani Nuhu
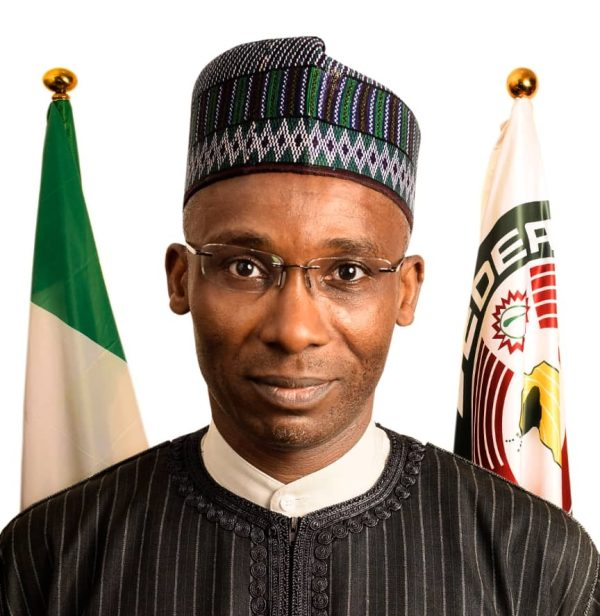

Nigeria's Ambassador and Permanent Representative to the Economic Community of West African States (ECOWAS)
- In office January 20, 2020 – December 16, 2025
- President: Muhammadu Buhari; Bola Tinubu
- Preceded by: Babatunde Anyinla Nurudeen
- Succeeded by: Olawale Emmanuel Awe

Head of ECOWAS National Unit (Ministry of Foreign Affairs)
- In office 2018–2019
- President: Muhammadu Buhari

Assistant Director, Office of the Under Secretary, African Affairs
- In office September 2017 – January 2018
- President: Muhammadu Buhari

Chargé d'affaires (ad interim), Embassy of Nigeria, Algiers, Algeria.
- In office February 2016 – September 2017
- President: Muhammadu Buhari

Senior Counsellor, Directorate of Technical Aid Corps
- In office September 2010 – January 2013
- President: Goodluck Jonathan

Counsellor, Asia Pacific Division (Ministry of Foreign Affairs)
- In office 2009–2010
- President: Umaru Musa Yar'Adua; Goodluck Jonathan

First Secretary, Embassy of Nigeria, Jakarta, Indonesia
- In office 2006–2009
- President: Olusegun Obasanjo; Umaru Musa Yar'Adua

Personal details
- Born: November 26, 1969 Saulawa, Katsina, Nigeria
- Education: Bayero University Kano Bachelor of Arts (B.A.) Special Honours; University of Jos Master of Arts (M.A.)
- Occupation: Civil Servant
- Profession: Diplomat

Musa Sani Nuhu (born 26 November 1969) is a Nigerian career diplomat and ambassador who served as Nigeria's Permanent Representative to the Economic Community of West African States (ECOWAS) from 2020 till 2025. He is the only West African diplomat to have ever chaired both the two core technical bodies overseeing all aspects of the ECOWAS system.

Nuhu is known for his role in ECOWAS restructuring, facilitating relations between ECOWAS and the Africa Union during West Africa's political realignment (2020-2024) as well as during the Sahel political crisis.

== Early life and education ==
Musa Sani Nuhu was born in Saulawa, Katsina, (then Kaduna State, Nigeria). He received his early education at Army Children School, Zaria, but he underwent Quranic education at home. He went to Kayalwa Primary School in Katsina, where he obtained his primary education between 1975 and 1981. He proceeded to Government Secondary School, Dutsin-Ma, where he obtained his General Certificate of Education (GCE), between 1981 and 1986. He went to the College of Advanced Studies (CAS), Zaria, for remedial studies, between 1986 and 1987.

He gained admission to Bayero University, Kano in 1988. After attending the School of General Studies, he proceeded to study history and graduated in 1992 with a B.A. (Special Honours) degree in History. He participated in the compulsory National Youth Service Corps (NYSC) scheme, working as a teacher at Government College, Kaduna (between 1992 and 1993). He went back to school in 1995 and gained admission to the University of Jos for postgraduate studies and graduated with an M.A. in Law and Diplomacy.

He also received training in diplomacy, negotiations and mediation at the Nigerian Foreign Service Academy, Badagry; United Nations University for Peace, China Foreign Affairs University; and Netherlands Institute of International Relations Clingendael.

== Diplomatic career ==
Nuhu began his diplomatic career with the Nigerian Ministry of Foreign Affairs in 2001, serving in multiple divisions, including the Inter-African Affairs Division and the Asia and Pacific Division. He also served in the Office of the Under-Secretary for African Affairs and had two postings with the Nigerian Technical Aid Corps (NTAC). He also served as First Secretary at the Embassy of Nigeria in Jakarta, Indonesia.

Between 2015 and 2017, Nuhu served as Senior/Minister Counsellor and later as Chargé d’Affaires at the Embassy of Nigeria in Algiers, Algeria. During this period, he led Nigeria's participation in diplomatic consultations on regional peace and security issues affecting North and West Africa, including counter-terrorism cooperation in the Sahel and the Lake Chad Basin. He was also involved in broader continental security initiatives and multilateral dialogue frameworks, including discussions associated with the Oran Process on African peace and security cooperation.

Before his ambassadorial appointment, Nuhu served as Head of the ECOWAS National Unit within Nigeria's Ministry of Foreign Affairs. He was also chair of the ECOWAS Administration and Finance Committee (AFC).

=== Permanent Representative to ECOWAS (2020–2025) ===
During his tenure as Nigeria's Permanent Representative to ECOWAS, Nuhu initiated internal reforms within the Nigerian Permanent Mission to expand its multilateral engagement capacity. These included establishing thematic clusters corresponding to ECOWAS Commission directorates. As chair of the Permanent Representatives Committee, he pushed reforms to strengthen the PRC's advisory and oversight role in ECOWAS institutional processes, as well as to reduce the number of commissioners as part of restructuring efforts.

Between 2021 and 2024, when ECOWAS was faced with military takeovers in the Sahel, ushering in the formation of the Alliance of Sahel States (AES), as chair of the Mediation and Security Council at the ambassadorial level, Nuhu led the deliberations among member states that recommended suspension measures, sanctions, and transitional frameworks

In April 2024, Nuhu was co-chair of the inaugural joint consultation between the African Union Peace and Security Council and the ECOWAS Mediation and Security Council.

During the COVID-19 pandemic, the mission facilitated the delivery of food aid from ECOWAS emergency reserves to Nigeria and activated the ECOWAS Early Warning System (ECOWARN) to monitor health-related and social stability indicators; it was also involved in ECOWAS electoral assessment processes conducted during the pandemic.

In December 2024, under Nuhu's leadership, Nigeria procured a new chancery building for the Permanent Mission. Also, for the first time in 19 years, Nigeria cleared its obligations to the community, paying 100% of its backlog, which amounted to ₦84 billion and $54 million. He also restructured the Mission which was originally conceived as a "smart mission" with limited staffing to a fully structured multilateral mission, introducing a thematic cluster system to monitor ECOWAS activities more closely and strengthen coordination with relevant Nigerian ministries, departments, and agencies on regional policy matters.

During his tenure as Nigeria’s Permanent Representative to ECOWAS, Nuhu coordinated institutional oversight activities within the Community’s governance structures. These included contributions to strategic planning processes for ECOWAS Vision 2050 and the Regional Resilience Strategy (2024–2050), as well as involvement in monitoring and evaluation reforms to strengthen results-based management and programme reporting across ECOWAS institutions.

His tenure also pursued the reduction of checkpoints along the Seme–Badagry corridor, a key trade route between Nigeria and neighbouring states under the ECOWAS Trade Liberalisation Scheme (ETLS), and partnered with the Nigeria Technical Aid Corps to expand Nigeria's technical support to West African states.

In 2024, Nuhu convened a high-level retreat in Lagos that examined the institutional implications of the announced withdrawal of certain member states from ECOWAS. The retreat brought together regional officials and policymakers to review options for maintaining institutional cohesion and addressing evolving political developments within the Community.

== Leadership roles within ECOWAS ==
- Ambassador and Permanent Representative of Nigeria to ECOWAS (2020–2025)
- Chair, ECOWAS Permanent Representatives Committee (PRC) (2023–2025)
- Chair, ECOWAS Administration and Finance Committee (AFC) (2018–2019)
- Chair, ECOWAS Mediation and Security Council (MSC) at ambassadorial level
- Co-Chair, AU–ECOWAS Joint Consultative Mechanism (between the ECOWAS MSC and the African Union Peace and Security Council)
- Head, ECOWAS National Unit (Nigeria)
- Pioneer Chair, West African Health Organisation (WAHO) Steering Committee
- Chair, ECOWAS Committee for the Evaluation and Selection of the New ECOWAS Headquarters Design
- Chair, ECOWAS Technical Committee for the Evaluation and Selection of the New ECOWAS Headquarters Design

== Reception and legacy ==
Nuhu received commendations from diplomatic colleagues for his remarkable contributions: President Omar Touray, on behalf of the Community, presented Ambassador Musa Sani Nuhu with an award, applauding him for "his outstanding service and significant contributions to the advancement of regional integration and cooperation within the ECOWAS framework... underscoring ECOWAS’ appreciation for his dedication and exemplary diplomatic service." He was also conferred with the Grand Legacy Laureate of Public Service (GLLPS) by the Institute for Historical Studies, Biographical Research, Documentation, and Legacy (IHS-BiRD & L). A Leadership Institute analyst noted that his role in ECOWAS would be "remembered not for dramatic breakthroughs but for measured containment, structural adjustment, and the preservation of multilateral continuity amid profound uncertainty".
