= Is-haq Oloyede =

Registrar of the Joint Admissions and Matriculation Board (JAMB)

Is-haq Oloyede CON FNAL

Registrar of the Joint Admissions and Matriculation Board
- In office 1 August 2016 – 31 July 2026
- Preceded by: Dibu Ojerinde
- Succeeded by: Segun Aina

Secretary General of Nigerian Supreme Council for Islamic Affairs
- Incumbent
- Assumed office May 2013
- Preceded by: Lateef Adegbite

8th Vice Chancellor of University of Ilorin
- In office 2007–2012
- Preceded by: Shamsudeen Amali
- Succeeded by: Abdul Ganiyu Ambali

Personal details
- Born: 10 October 1954 (age 72) Abeokuta, Western Region, British Nigeria (now in Ogun State, Nigeria)

Ishaq Olarewaju Oloyede CON FNAL Is-haq Oloyede.ogg(born 10 October 1954) is a Nigerian professor of Islamic Studies, and academic. He is a former Vice Chancellor of the University of Ilorin, Nigeria, and former registrar and chief executive of Joint Admissions and Matriculation Board (JAMB).

== Early life and education ==
He was born on 10 October 1954, in Abeokuta South local government area of Ogun State. Oloyede had his Secondary Education from 1969–1973 at the Progressive Institute, Agege Lagos. He then learned Arabic and Islamic Studies between 1973–1976 at the Arabic Training Centre Agege, Lagos, (Markaz). He received a certificate in Arabic and Islamic Studies at the University of Ibadan in 1977 and a B.A. in Arabic at the University of Ilorin in 1981. In July 1982 he was appointed an Assistant Lecturer in the Department of Religions of the University. In 1991, he had his Doctorate degree in Islamic Studies also from the University of Ilorin.

Oloyede earned several scholarships and prizes during his student days, notable among which were the Arab League prize for the best final year Certificate student in Arabic and Islamic Studies in 1977 at the University of Ibadan; Federal Government undergraduate merit award from 1979 to 1981; Department of Religions Award, University of Ilorin, 1981 and Faculty of Arts and Social Sciences Award, Unilorin also in 1981.

== Memberships ==
Oloyede is a member of the Board of the Association of Commonwealth Universities (2010 – 2012); and also a member of many learned and professional societies; • Fellow of the Islamic Academy of Cambridge, United Kingdom. • Fellow, Academy of Entrepreneurship. • Member of Nigerian Association of Teachers of Arabic and Islamic Studies (NATAIS). • Member of Editorial Board, Centre for Islamic Legal Studies, ABU, Zaria, among several others. • Former National President of the Unilorin Alumni Association (1995 and 1998).

== Career ==
Oloyede attained the rank of Professor in 1995. He was elected Vice Chancellor of his alma mater University of Ilorin in 2007 for a term of five years, during which the university became highly-ranked among the best in Africa and the most sought-after university in Nigeria.

Oloyede also served as the Chairman of the Association of Vice-Chancellors of Nigerian Universities and Committee of Vice-Chancellors between 2011–2012. At the international level, he has held several distinguished positions. Between 2009–2011, he was the president of the Association of African Universities (AAU). Other positions include: Deputy Chairman of the Governing Board of the International Association of Universities (IAU) [2008 – 2011]; and Secretary-General, Association of West African Universities (AWAU) [2013 – 2017]. In 2015, he was appointed the (2nd) Pro-Chancellor and Chairman of the 3rd Governing Council of Fountain University, Nigeria.

In 2005, he was appointed by President Olusegun Obasanjo as Co-Secretary of the National Political Reform Conference. In 2006, he was appointment as consultant by the National Universities Commission on Educational Reforms in Nigeria. Oloyede became the National Coordinator and Executive Secretary of the National Inter–Religious Council (NIREC) in 2007. Since 2013, he has been the Secretary-General of the Nigerian Supreme Council for Islamic Affairs (NSCIA).

In 2016, President Muhammadu Buhari appointed him as the Registrar of the Joint Admission and Matriculation Board (JAMB), an appointment, personally described "divine" by him, that was greeted by applause from several quarters of the Nigerian society. Since assumption of office, Oloyede has been praised for transforming JAMB into a reference point in effective public service delivery, transparency and accountability in Nigeria.

In May 2025, Oloyede broke into tears while apologising for technical glitches that negatively impacted the results of many UTME candidates in the Lagos and South-East zones. The problem affected a total 379,997 candidates who sat for the exam in 65 centres in Lagos state, and the five states of the south-eastern states of the country.

His tenure as JAMB Registrar is billed to end on July 31st 2026. This was confirmed following President Bola Tinubu's appointment of 39-year old Segun Aina as the new JAMB Registrar on the 21st of May 2026.
