= Tanko Ishaya =

Nigerian professor of computer science

10th substantive Vice Chancellor of the University of Jos
- Incumbent
- Assumed office December 2021
- Preceded by: Seddi Sabastian Maimako

Personal details
- Education: University of Jos; University of Manchester
- Occupation: Computer Science Professor

Tanko Ishaya is a Nigerian Professor of Computer Science and the vice chancellor of the University of Jos. He was appointed into office in December 2021.

== Early life and career ==
Ishaya obtained a bachelor of science in Mathematics Education from the University of Jos in 1992 and began to teach Mathematics at the College of Agriculture, Zuru, Kebbi State. He completed a Masters Degree in Computation at the University of Manchester in 1997. and completed a Ph.D. in Computing Studies in 2001. After a period of years lecturing at the University of Hull (Scarborough Campus), he returned to Jos, where he was later promoted to a Professor of Computer Science in 2012.
