= Etannibi Alemika =

Professor at the University of Jos

Etannibi Alemika is a professor of Criminology and the Sociology of Law at the University of Jos. In August 2015, he was one of seven individuals appointed to a newly formed anti-corruption board organized by President Muhammadu Buhari. His most widely cited article is titled Policing and Perceptions of Police in Nigeria, which was published in 1988.

== Early life and education ==
Alemika studied sociology at the University of Ibadan where he also got a master's degree in the same course. In 1985, he got a master's degree from University of Pennsylvania, graduating with distinction before he proceeded to obtain a doctorate degree in criminology.

== Academic career ==
He is a member of several organizations including the American Society of Criminology and Academy of Criminal Justice Sciences. In 2013, he posited the need for a Nigerian repository of information for use by security agencies that will aid and combat crime. In a 2017 lecture held in Lagos State, Alemika decried the situation of homeland security and called on legislators to create laws that will ensure effective policing in the Nigeria.

== Administrative appointments ==
- Member, Buhari's anti-corruption war seven-man committee

== Personal life ==
=== Emily Alemika ===
He is married to Emily Alemika, who is also a professor. Emily, a lecturer in the department of public law, faculty of law, University of Jos was born with separated parents and worked as a maid in several homes before starting primary school at age 13. She has a diploma in law from Ahmadu Bello University and a master's degree in Criminal justice. She describes her husband as being solely responsible for her accomplishment in life and her saving grace. Explaining that he is a person who never uses gender as a discriminatory factor in issues. She is also the first professor of law from Kogi State.

In 2017, his wife was appointed as a member of the governing council at Kogi State University by Governor Yahaya Bello.
