= Ayibatonye Owei =

Nigerian physician and politician

- Born: Ayibatonye Owei; 12 July 1957 (age 69); Lagos
- Education: University of Jos
- Occupations: Doctor, businessman, politician
- Years active: 1984–present
- Spouse: Ngozika Owei
- Children: 4

Ayibatonye Owei (born 12 July 1957) is a Nigerian physician and politician who served as the Commissioner of Health for Bayelsa State from 2014–2016.

== Early life and education ==
Ayibatonye Owei was born on 12 July, 1957 in Lagos, Nigeria. Hailing from Sangana, Akassa, he completed his primary education at the Apapa Methodist Primary School in Apapa from 1963–1970 and his secondary education at St. Gregory's College in Ikoyi from 1971–1975. From 1976–1982, he studied medicine at the University of Jos, where he also served as his class's president and the financial secretary of the Medical Students Association from 1978–1980.

After completing his internship at the University of Port Harcourt Teaching Hospital, Owei served in the mandatory National Youth Service Corps in Aguata, where he established a 24-hour emergency service laboratory and blood bank at the Niger Diocesan Hospital in Umunze.

== Academic career ==
After his National Youth Service in 1984, Dr. Ayibatonye Owei started his medical career as a Medical Officer at the General Hospital Brass. He worked through most of the General hospitals in the then Rivers State. He later became the Chief Medical Officer. During this period, he became the Chairman of the Association of Resident Doctors, Rivers State from 1989 to 1993, Vice Chairman of the Nigerian Medical Association Rivers State 1994–1995, and Pioneer Chairman of the Nigerian Medical Association, Bayelsa State Chapter, a position he held from 1996 to 2000. He thereafter proceeded to his postgraduate specialist training in Obstetrics and Gynaecology at the University of Heidelberg Women's Hospital (Frauen Klinik), Germany. He obtained the Fellowship from the German Board (Facharzt Obs & Gynae) and the European Board & College of Obstetrics and Gynaecology in 2008. He underwent a two-year training at the University of Cape Town Teaching Hospital; Groote Schurr and the University of Stellenbosch Teaching Hospital; Tygerberg, South Africa. He worked closely with Prof TF Kruger; a famous gynaecologist of “Tygerberg strict criteria” for evaluating sperm morphology. On return to the Country, he became the consultant obstetrician gynaecologist to Her Excellency and Chair of the medical team in Bayelsa State who carried out Pap Smear Screening of over 6000 women against cervical cancer as well as performed free medical interventions to over 10,000 women over 3 years.

== Business and political career ==
He ventured into business as the Chairman of Avondale Services and Supplies Ltd and Eti Health and Leisure Companies in South Africa & Nigeria, a position he held till March 2014. On the 15th of April 2014, he was appointed the Honourable Commissioner of Health, Bayelsa State by Hon. Henry Seriake Dickson. He led the high-powered committee on Ebola, the collaborations between the state ministry of health and donor agencies/multinationals, the revamping of the health sector; schools of nursing/midwifery; the Niger Delta University Teaching Hospital, etc.

Owei is a scholar, administrator, a fellow of the European Board & College of Obstetrics and Gynaecology, and a member of the Society of Gynaecology and Obstetrics of Nigeria.

== Personal life ==
Dr. Ayibatonye Owei is married with four children. His wife is Ngozika Owei and his children are Lily Owei, Pearl Owei, Daisy Owei, and Cassandra Owei.
