= Seddi Sabastian Maimako =

Nigerian academic

Prof. Sebastian Maimako

9th Substantive Vice-Chancellor University of Jos
- In office 23 June 2016 – 23 June 2021
- Preceded by: Hayward Mafuyai
- Succeeded by: Gray Goziem Ejikeme

Personal details
- Born: Jos, Nigeria
- Education: University of Jos
- Occupation: Accounting and finance professor

Prof Sebastian Maimako is a Nigerian academic and professor of accounting and finance. He was the 9th substantive Vice-Chancellor of the University of Jos. He was appointed by the Governing Council of the university to succeed Professor Hayward Mafuyai and was in office from 23 June 2016, until 23 June 2021, after finishing five years as a Vice-Chancellor. He was regarded as one of the best Vice-Chancellor the University Community will ever have.

== Education ==
Maimako obtained a Bachelor of Science in Management Science in 1987 from the University of Jos, following the completion of a compulsory one year youth service program in 1988. He later earned a master's degree in Business Administration (1992), and a doctorate in management (2006).

== Career ==
Maimako began his academic career in January 1989 as a graduate assistant in the Faculty of Management Science at the University of Jos. He became a full professor of Accounting and Finance in 2010. Maimako contributed to the development of the curriculum for the teaching of Accounting and Finance in Nigerian universities. He has served as Head and Acting Head of the Department of Management Science, Dean and Deputy Dean of the Faculty of Management Science, and Deputy Dean of the Faculty of Social Sciences at Jos.

Maimako is also a member of the Institute of Chartered Accountants of Nigeria.
