= National Board for Arabic and Islamic Studies =

Educational organization of Nigeria

Educational overview
- Formed: 1960
- Jurisdiction: Federal Republic of Nigeria
- Status: Active
- Headquarters: Zaria Road, Rigachikun, Kaduna, Nigeria
- Educational executive: Muhammad Shafiu Abdullahi
- Parent department: Federal Ministry of Education, Nigeria
- Website: https://nbais.gov.ng/

The National Board for Arabic and Islamic Studies (NBAIS; Arabic: المجلس الوطني للدراسات العربية والإسلامية) is a government organization tasked with planning and implementing Arabic and Islamic studies curriculum in Nigeria. It was established in 1960 as an independent body then became a department in Ahmadu Bello University, Zaria, with activities mainly in the northern part of Nigeria. In 2011, the body was mandated to cover the entire country making it another examination body in Nigeria. Former executive secretary Muhammad Shafiu Abdullahi facilitated its Headquarters' movement to Rigachikun from Zaria in Kaduna State.

== History ==
The National Board for Arabic and Islamic Studies (NBAIS) was founded by Alhaji Sir, Ahmadu Bello Sardauna of Sokoto in 1960. Subsequently, it was transferred to Ahmadu Bello University, Zaria in 1969.The Board has undergone series of positive transformation. Firstly, as a Board for the Northern part of Nigeria only with few Schools and Colleges under its tutelage. Currently, with the recognition and approval of National Council on Education (NCE) at its 57th meeting held at Sokoto in February, 2011, the Board as a National Examination and Regulatory Body covers the whole nation with over 900 recognized schools and colleges.

== Examinations ==
The National Board for Arabic and Islamic Studies carries out examinations annually for Senior Secondary Students across the country who have registered with the board. Currently, the board plans and conducts three different examination every academic session. They are:

1. Senior Arabic and Islamic Secondary School Certificate Examination (SAISSCE)
2. Tahfeez Examination for students majoring in Qur'anic Sciences
3. Science (for Conventional curriculum)

== Challenges ==
After expanding the scope of the board's activities to cover the 36 states of the country including the Federal Capital Territory (FCT), it was faced with several challenges. These challenges include the recognition of the certificate offered by the board. Many academic institutions including some federal universities refused to recognize the certificate due to one reason or another. Another challenge was embezzlement allegation labelled against the registrar. In 2021, a media house reported an allegation case against him for siffoning away a huge sum of money belonging to the board which was debunked by the board. It also accused some high-ranking members of the board for employing family members and friends in the board.
