= Capital City University =

Private university in Kano, Nigeria

- Motto: For Intellection and Integrity
- Type: Private
- Established: 2021
- Chancellor: Ahmed Nuhu Bamalli
- Vice-Chancellor: Professor Yusuf B Daraja
- Location: Kano, Kano State, Nigeria; 11.9924130°N 8.5568220°E
- Campus: Urban
- Website: https://www.capitalcityunikano.com

Capital City University is a private university located in Kano, Nigeria. The institution was established in 2021 following the approval of the Federal Government of Nigeria in February of that year.

== History and governance ==
Capital City University was founded in 2021 and received its provisional licence from the National Universities Commission (NUC) in February of the same year. Academic activities began with 150 students and staff, and the university was formally inaugurated in January 2022. Teaching commenced fully the following month with two faculties, twelve departments and thirteen academic programmes. The institution has since expanded to four faculties, twenty departments and thirty academic programmes.

The pioneer Chancellor of the university was the Emir of Zazzau, Ahmed Nuhu Bamalli, while the Pro-Chancellor was Lt. Gen. Abdulrahman Bello Dambazau (rtd.).

== Academics ==
The university offers undergraduate programmes across four faculties. As of 2025, 32 degree programmes are available.

=== Faculty of Health Science ===
- Doctor of Physiotherapy
- Nursing Science.
- Radiography
- Medical Laboratory Science

=== Faculty of Science and Computing ===
- Biochemistry
- Computer Science
- Mathematics
- Microbiology
- Forensic Science
- Physics and Electronics
- Software Engineering
- Cyber Security
- Statistics and Data Science
- Digital Entrepreneurship
- Industrial Chemistry and Chemical Entrepreneurship

=== Faculty of Management and Social Science ===
- Economics
- Political Science
- International Relations
- Criminology and Security Studies
- Business Management
- Entrepreneurship
- Procurement and Management
- Accounting
- Banking and Finance
- Islamic Banking
- Insurance
- Hospitality and Tourism Management
- Film Production

=== Faculty of Pharmaceutical Science ===
- Doctor of Pharmacy
