= National Teachers Institute =

Teachers distance learning institution

The National Teachers' Institute (NTI) is a single-mode distance learning institution focused on teacher education. The institute has satellite campuses in all the 774 local government areas in Nigeria.

== History ==
The National Teachers' Institute was founded in 1976 by the Federal Government of Nigeria in response to the country's urgent demand for educated and competent teaching staff at all levels of the educational system.

In the NTI's NCE remote learning programs, 34,486 people graduated between 1993 and 1996.
