= Evaluability assessment =

An evaluability assessment (EA) is a qualitative investigation employed before a programme is evaluated.

== Description ==
Evaluability assessments (EAs) provide information on whether or not a programme can be evaluated. They are also used to describe the objectives, logic, and activities of the programme with an aim to investigate its credibility, feasibility, sustainability, and acceptability. EAs address the likelihood of the programme achieving its anticipated outcomes, the changes necessary for optimum management, whether an evaluation can improve the programme's performance, and to identify stakeholder interests in the evaluation and how the findings will be used. According to Jung and Schubert, the following specific aspects of a programme need to be addressed by an EA:

- Obtaining perspectives of all involved in the programme, e.g. programme staff and stakeholders
- Investigating the programmes objectives and the methods to measure whether they were achieved
- Providing information on how the programme is actually functioning
- Identifying ways to improve the programme
- Relaying important information about the programme

== Procedure ==
Evaluability assessors form a workgroup, which comprises an evaluation representative and a managerial member of the programme. The workgroup investigates official programme records and documentation. In addition, interviews and observations are conducted to understand and describe how the programme is perceived by the programme staff and relevant stakeholders. The workgroup is supervised by a policy group who oversees managerial decisions concerning the impending evaluation of the programme. Jung and Schubert provided the following six areas that should be addressed in an EA:

- Identifying the programme's objectives
- Identifying the intended activities to achieve the programme objectives
- Identifying incongruities between the programme's objectives and its intended activities
- Investigating field operations
- Comparing actual field operations to the programme's intended activities
- Providing management and evaluation options

== Potential limitations ==
An effective EA requires that workgroups and policy groups collaboratively engage with programme staff and stakeholders. This could be problematic when there are differences or tensions that arise between programme staff and stakeholders, posing a challenge to the EA. Thurston, Graham, and Hatfield assert that EAs are beneficial since they facilitate programme revisions. It is often found that after an EA, programmes require some modifications, as there could be inconsistencies with the logic model or issues concerning implementation.

A tension may arise when there are positive unintended outcomes that occur when a programme is poorly designed. How do the evaluability assessors, programme staff and stakeholders manage this difficulty? Is it permissible to allow the problematic programme to operate because of the benefits derived from it, or should the programme be put on hold and reformulated resulting in the end of the positive unintended outcomes?

== Conclusion ==
EAs are complex and require cooperation from relevant individuals involved in a programme. They are subjective assessments of how credible a programme is. Despite their limitations, EAs are valuable tools to promptly address issues that arise in a programme. If an EA is efficiently conducted on a poorly designed programme, it has the potential to save programme staff and stakeholders time and funding resources that would be otherwise wasted if the programme were to continue operating unaltered.
