= Unified Tertiary Matriculation Examination =

Standardized test used for Nigerian college admissions

- Acronym: UTME
- Type: Computer-based standardized test
- Administrator: Joint Admissions and Matriculation Board (JAMB)
- Purpose: Admission to undergraduate programs of universities or colleges in Nigeria
- Year started: 1978; 48 years ago
- Duration: 2 hours
- Score range: Test scored on scale of 0–400
- Score validity: 1 year
- Offered: 1 time annually
- Regions: Nigeria
- Languages: English
- Annual number of test takers: ▲2,243,816 in 2026
- Prerequisites: No official prerequisite. Intended for high school students. Fluency in English assumed.
- Fee: Varies yearly
- Used by: All universities and colleges offering undergraduate programs in Nigeria
- Website: Official website

The Unified Tertiary Matriculation Examination (UTME) is a computer-based standardized examination used for college admissions in Nigeria. Since its debut in 1978, it has maintained two components, art and science based tests, each of which 3 of its subjects, with Use of English as compulsory, were scored on a range from 0 to 400. Prior to 2014, the exam was a paper-and-pencil test until 17 May 2014 when it became computer-based.

== Policies ==
Registration is usually once in a year, and candidates are allowed to register in four subjects only. The only mandatory subject is English Studies (termed 'Use of English') and any other three subjects relevant to the proposed course of study as set out in the relevant chapters of the Joint Admissions and Matriculation Board Unified Tertiary Matriculation Examination brochure.

The board prohibits the use of calculators, timers, or other electronic devices during the exam. Cellular phones are also strictly prohibited from exam rooms and individuals found to possess them are penalised, usually made to forfeit the exam. The only item that may be brought into the testing room is the candidate's Reprinted E-registration slip. Exam results are made available just few days after the exam has been conducted via board's website, SMS and email. The board also sends scores to universities and institutions being applied to.

== Preparation ==
The Joint Admissions and Matriculation Board does not prepare candidates for its examination by establishing secondary schools or tutorial centers, and no such institution is affiliated with the body.

However, the board provides a syllabus brochure, which is either made available online or given to students when they register. Candidates are expected to cover all the subject areas in the syllabus.

The board also has an online practice test on its website which enables students to practice. There are also some test software and applications which are made by several test preparatory companies, none of which are affiliated with the board.

Students also purchase books that contain questions asked in the exam during previous years. The book is made by different publishing companies.

== JAMB subject combinations ==
JAMB subject combinations refer to the specific subjects that a student must select during the UTME registration process. Each course of study has its unique set of required subjects, and students must carefully choose the right combination to be eligible for admission to their preferred courses.

Common JAMB subject combinations are:

- Medicine and surgery: physics, chemistry, biology.
- Engineering: mathematics, physics, chemistry.
- Law: use of English, literature in English, government or history, and any other arts or social science subject.
- Economics: mathematics, economics, and any other social science subject.
- Psychology: use of English, biology, mathematics, and any other subject.
- Civil engineering: mathematics, physics, chemistry.
- Computer Science: mathematics, physics, and one other science subject.
- Pharmacy: use of English, biology, physics, chemistry.
- Political Science: Use of English, Mathematics, Government, Economics
