= National Commission for Almajiri and Out-of-School Children Education =

Nigerian government agency

- NCAOOSCE

Agency overview
- Formed: 27 May 2023
- Jurisdiction: Nigeria
- Headquarters: 1st Floor, WAEC Building, Zambezi Crescent, Maitama, Abuja, Nigeria
- Agency executive: Dr. Muhammad Sani Idris, Executive Secretary
- Parent agency: Federal Ministry of Education
- Website: ncaoosce.gov.ng

National Commission for Almajiri and Out-of-School Children Education (NCAOOSCE) is a federal government agency in Nigeria. Established in May 2023, the agency operates under the Federal Ministry of Education and is mandated to address the population of out-of-school children and integrate basic literacy into the Almajiri education system.

== History ==
The establishment of the commission followed the passage of the National Commission for Almajiri and Out-of-School Children Education Bill by the National Assembly. The bill was signed into law by President Muhammadu Buhari on 27 May 2023, during the final days of his administration.

In March 2024, President Bola Tinubu appointed Muhammad Sani Idris as the Executive Secretary and chief executive officer of the commission.

== Functions ==
The commission is legally tasked with providing policy direction, regulating the curriculum for Almajiri schools, and managing funds dedicated to reducing the number of out-of-school children in Nigeria. Its operational focus includes creating non-formal education frameworks, providing vocational training, and conducting geographic mapping to locate out-of-school demographics.
