= National Business and Technical Examinations Board =

Examination board in Nigeria

- Abbreviation: NABTEB
- Formation: April 1992; 34 years ago
- Type: Examination body in Nigeria
- Purpose: Educational
- Region served: Nigeria
- Services: National Technical Certificate (NTC), Advanced National Technical Certificate (ANTC), National Business Certificate (NBC), Advanced National Business Certificate (ANBC), and Modular Trade Certificate (MTC)
- Registrar: Ifeoma Mercy Isiugo-Abanihe
- Website: Official website

The National Business and Technical Examinations Board popularly known as NABTEB, is a Nigerian examination board that conducts examinations for technical and business innovation colleges in Nigeria. The National Business and Technical Examinations Board (NABTEB) was established under the Decree No. 70 (now Act 70) of the 1993 constitution. The Decree (Act) mandated NABTEB with the responsibility to conduct Technical and Business Innovations certificate examinations hitherto being conducted by the West African Examinations Council (WAEC), London Royal Society of Arts, City and Guilds of London. It was established during the regime of Nigeria Military Head of State, General Ibrahim Babangida. The NABTEB examinations are conducted biannually in May/June and November/December respectively.

== History ==
The National Business and Technical Examinations Board were established in 1992 to domesticate the examinations which were being conducted by the London Royal Society of Arts (RSA), City and Guild (C&G) of London and the West African Examinations Council's technical and business examinations and to tailor them towards the needs of the Nigerian society by the provisions of the National Policy on Education. The establishment of the board came as a result of over 15 years of battle for the establishment from 1977 to 1992 and four Government Panels was set up at different times to review the position and structure of public examinations in Nigeria's educational system. NABTEB was the first Federal organization to offer subsidized registrations to academic candidates in Nigeria.

== Administration ==
NABTEB is headed by a Chief Executive Registrar, Ifeoma Mercy Isiugo-Abanihe, she was appointed by president Muhammadu Buhari under section 9(1) of its establishing Act.
