= University of Jos =

Public university in Jos, Nigeria

Coordinates: 9°57′01″N 8°53′21″E

- Motto: Discipline and Dedication
- Type: Public
- Established: 1975
- Chairman: Grace Folashade Bent
- Chancellor: Ahmed Nuhu Bamalli (Emir of Zazzau)
- Vice-Chancellor: Prof. Tanko Ishaya
- Students: 52,000
- Location: Jos, Plateau State, Nigeria
- Campus: 2,300 hectares (5,800 acres); Multiple sites
- Colors: White, green, blue, brown, gold
- Nicknames: UNIJOS, UJ
- Website: www.unijos.edu.ng

The University of Jos, abbreviated as Unijos, is a federal university in Jos, Plateau State, central Nigeria.

== History ==
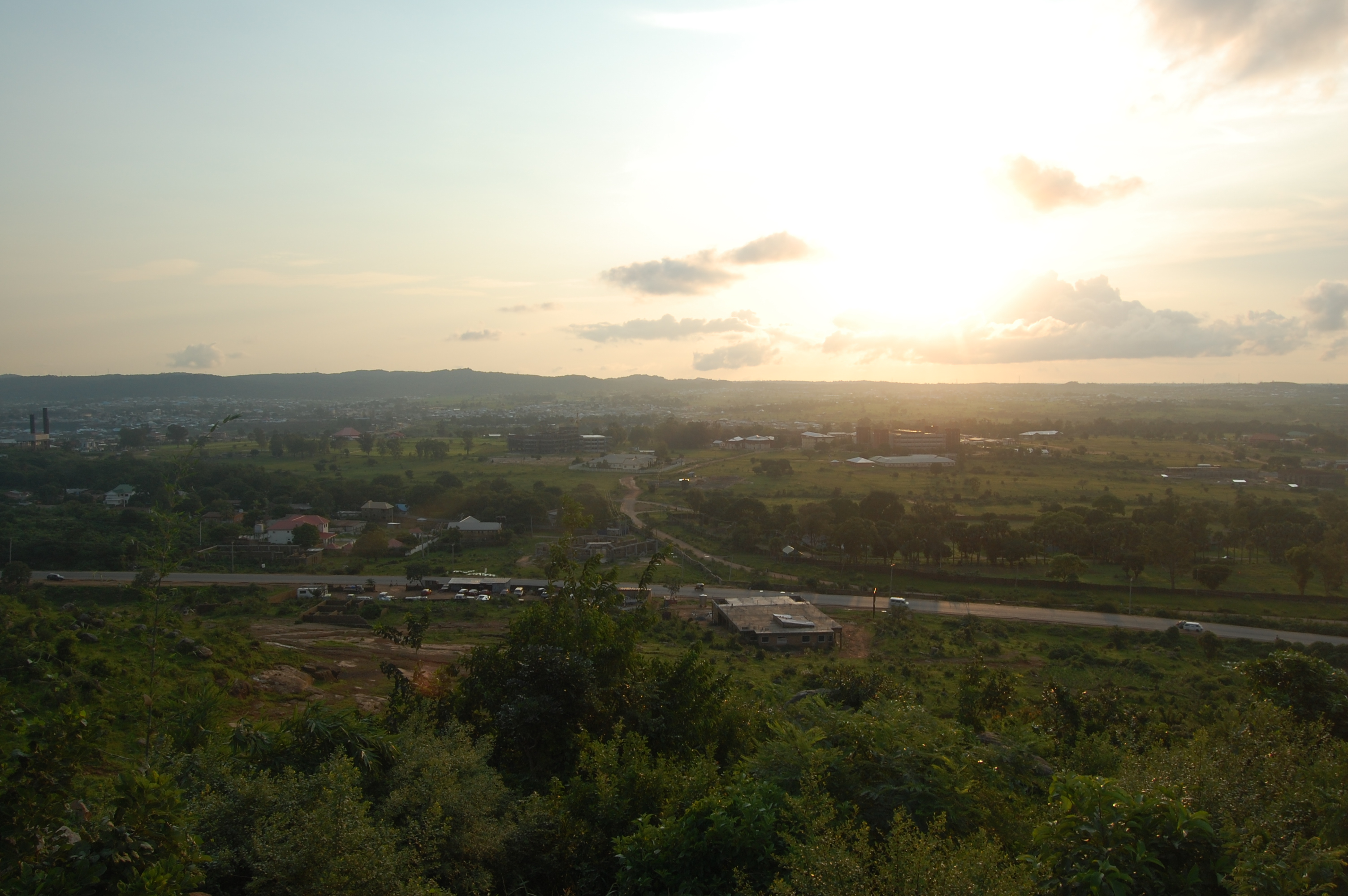
The new university campus

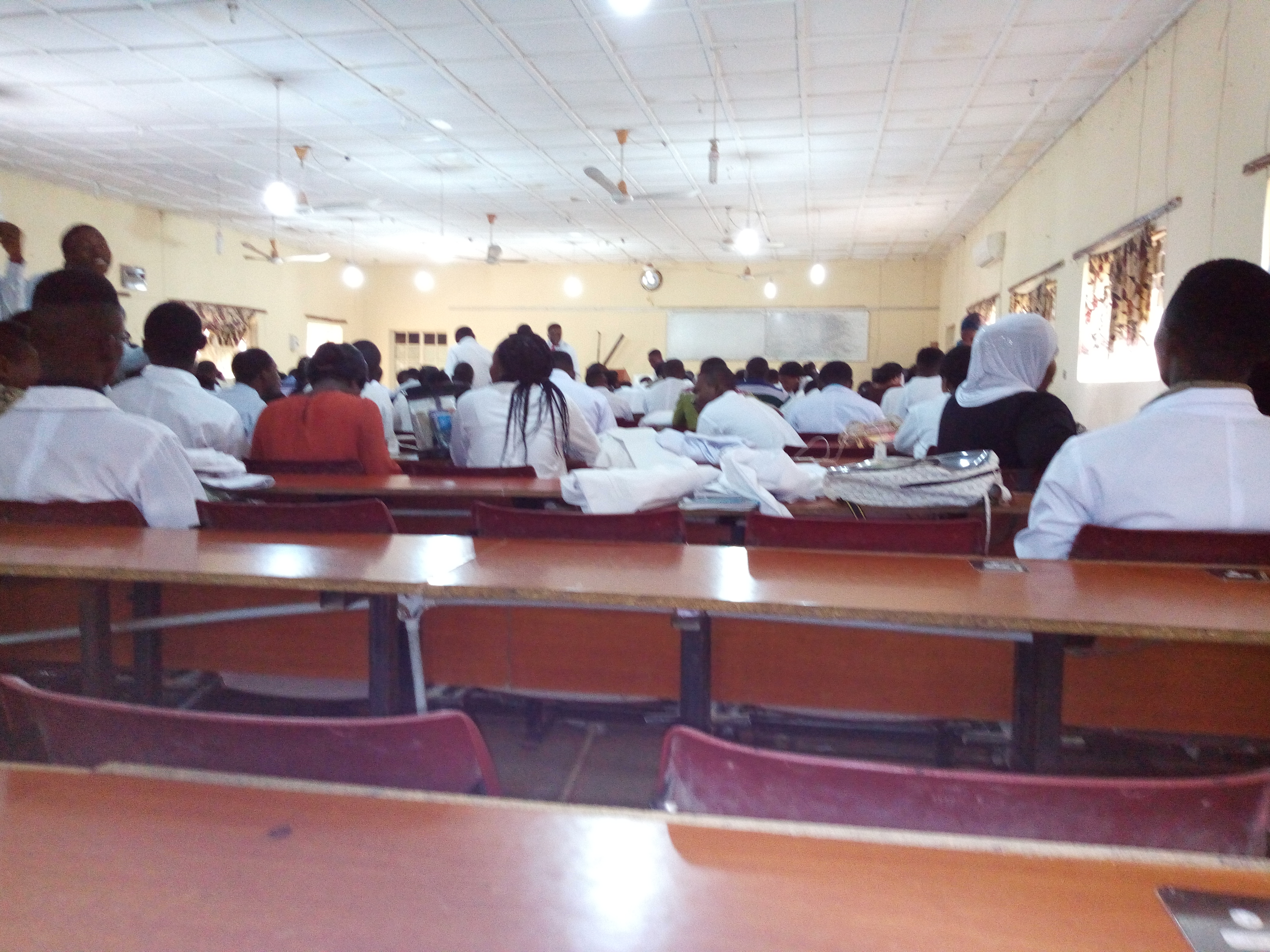

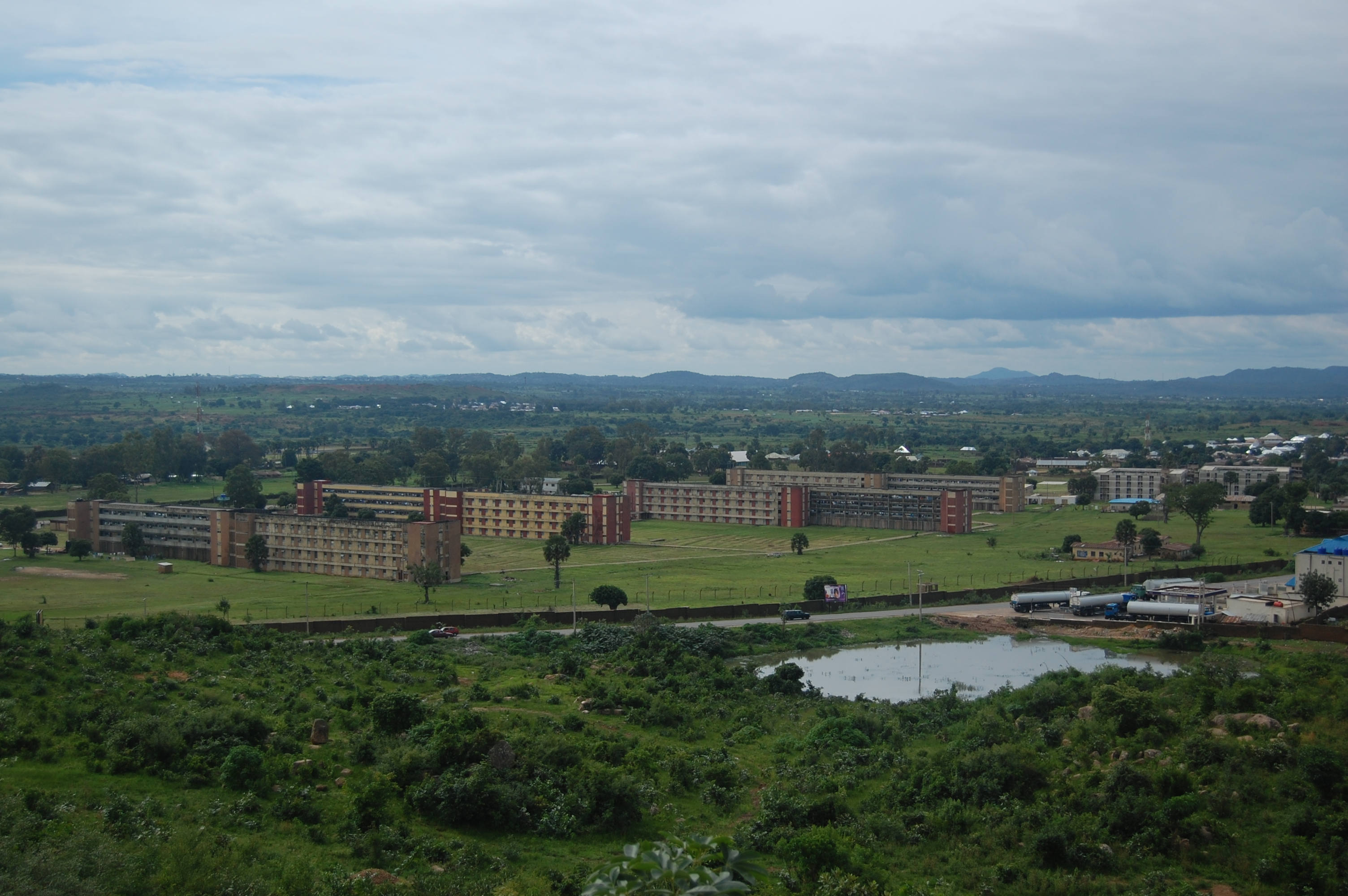
Dormitories

What became the University of Jos was established in November 1971 from the satellite campus of the University of Ibadan. The first students were admitted in January 1972 as pre-degree students and the first Bachelor of Arts degree program began in October 1973. In October 1975, the then military government under General Murtala Mohammed established the Unijos as a separate institution. The first Vice-Chancellor of the Unijos was Professor Gilbert Onuaguluchi. Classes began at the newly reorganized University of Jos in October 1976 with 575 students spreading over the existing four faculties of Arts and Social Sciences, Education, Natural Sciences and Medical Sciences. Post-graduate programs were added in 1977. By 1978 Faculties of Law and Environmental Sciences were established and the Faculties of Arts and Social Sciences were separated.

In 2003, the Carnegie Corporation of New York gave Unijos a $2 million grant to form its own fundraising department.

== Library ==
It is an Academic library that was established in 1962 to support teaching, learning and research which was located in the campus of the University of Ibadan before its move to Jos. Presently, the library is located along Bauchi road opposite the Federal College of Forestry, Jos. The library has sections like serial unit, system unit, reserve unit and circulation unit. The University librarian is professor Victoria Ladi Lawal who is the 6th University Librarian of the University of Jos. Appointment effective from 14 February 2025.

== Faculties ==
S/N	Faculties
1	Faculty of Agriculture
2	Faculty of Arts
3	Faculty of Education
4	Faculty of Engineering
5	Faculty of Environmental Sciences
6	Faculty of Law
7	Faculty of Management Sciences
8	Faculty of Natural Sciences
9	Faculty of Pharmaceutical Sciences
10	Faculty of Social Sciences
11	Faculty of Veterinary Medicine
12	Faculty of Dental Sciences
13	Faculty of Clinical Sciences
14	Faculty of Health Sciences & Technology
15	Faculty of Basic Medical Sciences

Note: Items 12 - 15 are all under the College of Medical Sciences

== List of programmes and courses ==
Faculty of Agriculture

- Agricultural Economics & Extension
- Animal Production
- Crop Production

Faculty of Arts

- English
- History and International Studies
- Foreign Languages
- Mass Communication
- Religion Philosophy
- Theater and Film Arts
- Linguistics and Nigerian Languages
- Archeology and Heritage Studies
- Music

Faculty of Education

- Educational management
- Arts Education
- Educational Foundation
- Science and Technology Education
- Social Science Education
- Special Education and Rehabilitation Sciences
- Physical and Health Education

Faculty of Engineering

- Civil Engineering
- Electrical and Electronic Engineering
- Mechanical Engineering
- Mining Engineering

Faculty of Environmental Sciences

- Architecture
- Building
- Estate Management
- Fine and Applied Arts
- Geography and Planning
- Quantity Surveying
- Urban and Regional Planning

Faculty of Law

- Commercial Law
- Public Law
- Private Law
- International Law and Jurisprudence

Faculty of Management Sciences

- Accounting
- Actuarial Science
- Banking and Finance
- Business Administration
- Business Management
- Insurance
- Marketing

Faculty of Natural Sciences

- Chemistry
- Computer Science
- Geology
- Mathematics
- Microbiology
- Physics
- Plant Science and Biotechnology
- Remedial Sciences
- Science Laboratory Technology
- Zoology

Faculty of Pharmaceutical Sciences

- Biotechnology Pharmaceutics
- Clinical Pharmacy and Pharmacy Practice
- Pharmaceutical Chemistry
- Pharmaceutical Microbiology
- Pharmaceutical Technology and Industrial Pharmacy
- Pharmacognosy and Traditional Medicine
- Pharmacology

Faculty of Social Sciences

- Economics
- Political Science
- Psychology
- Sociology
- Theriogenology and Production

Faculty of Veterinary Sciences

- Veterinary Anatomy
- Veterinary Microbiology and Pathology
- Veterinary Microbiology and Pathology
- Veterinary Parasitology and Entomology
- Veterinary Physiology, Biochemistry and Pharmacology
- Veterinary Public Health and Preventive Medicine

== Notable alumni ==
- Andrew Agwunobi, interim president of the University of Connecticut, U.S.
- John O. Agwunobi, CEO of Herbalife Nutrition
- Kayode Ajulo, Lawyer, Arbitrator, Right Activist ad former National Secretary, Labour Party
- Etannibi Alemika, first female professor of law from the Kogi State
- Charity Angya, former Vice-chancellor Benue State University
- Solomon Dalung, former lecturer in the Faculty of Law and Minister of Youth and Sports
- Delmwa Deshi-Kura, Nigerian Film Production executive
- Yakubu Dogara, former speaker, House of Representatives
- Salamatu Fada, scientist
- Yusuf Adamu Gagdi, member, House of Representatives, Federal Republic of Nigeria
- Helon Habila, novelist
- Doug Kazé, musician, lecturer, novelist
- Esther Ibanga, pastor and peace prize winner
- Chukwuemeka Ike, novelist
- Audu Maikori, lawyer, entrepreneur
- Ali Mazrui, Kenyan political scientist
- Efe Money, Nigerian Artiste
- Saint Obi, Nigerian actor
- Ebikibina Ogborodi, acting registrar of NECO
- Ruth L. Okediji, Jeremiah Smith, Jr. Professor of Law at Harvard University
- Edward David Onoja, Deputy Governor of Kogi State.
- Viola Onwuliri, Minister of Foreign affairs and Minister of State for Education, Nigeria, Professor of Biochemistry
- Ayibatonye Owei, Commissioner of Health, Bayelsa State
- Charles O'Tudor, brand strategist, entrepreneur
- Herbert Gomagallah Daniel, economist, writer and development communicator
- Igho Sanomi, Nigerian businessman
- Pauline Tallen, Nigerian politician
- Musa Sani Nuhu, Nigeria’s Permanent Representative to the Economic Community of West African States (ECOWAS) from 2020 to 2025.
- Yonov Frederick Agah, Nigerian diplomat and former deputy director-general of the World Trade Organization.

== Vice chancellors ==
S/N	Name	Tenure Starts	Tenure Ends	Capacity
1	E. A. Ayandele	1971	1975	Acting
2	Gilbert Onuaguluchi	1975	1978	1st Substantive
3	E. U. Emovon	1978	1985	2nd Substantive
4	Ochapa C. Onazi	1985	1989	3rd Substantive
5	Para Mallum	1989	1993	4th Substantive
6	G. O. M. Tasie	1993	1994	Acting
7	N.E. Gomwalk	1994	1999	5th Substantive
8	M. Y. Mangvwat	2000	2001	Acting
9	M. Y. Mangvwat	2001	2006	6th Substantive
10	C.O.E. Onwuliri	2006	2006	Acting
11	Sonni Gwanle Tyoden	2006	2011	7th Substantive
12	Hayward Babale Mafuyai	2011	2016	8th Substantive
13	Seddi Sabastian Maimako	June 23, 2016	June 22, 2021	9th Substantive
14	Gray Goziem Ejikeme	June 23, 2021	Nov. 30, 2021	Acting
15	Tanko Ishaya	Dec. 1, 2021	Nov. 30, 2026	10 Substantive
16	Patricia Lar	Dec. 1, 2026	Present	11 Substantive

== Controversy ==
On 4 March 2022, a 300-level (Year 3) student of the institution committed suicide due to the strike of the Academic Staff Union of Universities. It was reported by PremiumTimes that the student had allegedly left a note stating his frustration as a result of the strike.

== See also ==
- List of universities in Nigeria
- Category:University of Jos people
