= Joint Admissions and Matriculation Board =

Nigerian examination board

- Official logo
- Abbreviation: JAMB
- Founded: 1978; 48 years ago
- Type: Examination board
- Purpose: Admission into tertiary institutions.
- Headquarters: Bwari, Abuja
- Location: Nigeria
- Official language: English
- Registrar: Prof. Is-haq Oloyede
- Website: www.jamb.gov.ng

The Joint Admissions and Matriculation Board (JAMB) is a Nigerian entrance examination board for tertiary-level institutions. The board conducts the Unified Tertiary Matriculation Examination (UTME) for prospective undergraduates into Nigerian universities. The board is also charged with the responsibility to administer similar examinations for applicants to Nigerian monotechnics, polytechnics, and colleges of education. All of these candidates must have obtained the West African Senior School Certificate Examination (WASSCE) conducted yearly by the West African Examinations Council, or its equivalent, NECO, conducted by the National Examination Council.

The pioneer registrar was Michael Saidu Angulu, who served from inception in 1978 until 1986. The current registrar of JAMB is Prof Ishaq Oloyede, who was appointed by President Muhammadu Buhari in August 2016. Registration for 2024 UTME commenced on 15 January 2024 and ended on 26 February 2024. The main examination is scheduled to commence on 19 April and end on 29 April 2024, while the optional Mock examination was held on 7 March 2024.

== CBT centres ==
The computer based test centres are various locations and centres in Nigeria approved by the board for the registration and writing of UTME. As of March 2024, there are about 793 centres.

== Examinations ==
Every year, the Joint Admission and Matriculation Board conducts credible examinations in Nigeria that determines whether a student will be admitted to a tertiary institution of learning. A record number of nearly 1.8 million candidates registered for the 2022 examination.

The Unified Tertiary Matriculation Examination is only valid for a year, and has a score range 0–400. The examination is a test of knowledge, speed and accuracy. It consists of 180 questions with a time frame of 2 hours (120 minutes). The subject combination vary based on a candidate's desired course of study, although English language is compulsory for all candidates.

The examination is conducted for international candidates who wish to be admitted into any Nigerian tertiary institution by the West African Examination Council (WAEC).

After the conduct of the year's examination, the board sits and deliberates on the cut-off mark for universities, polytechnics, colleges of education and 'monotechniques'. Often universities have the higher cut-off mark, while other institutions require lower marks.

In 2024 Jamb reduced its cut off mark to 140 for private and public universities and 100 for polytechnics and colleges of education.

Jamb gives admission to students whose school of choice has already confirmed as fit and qualified for admission. The only thing JAMB does is to confirm the admission and upload it on their portal then issue out JAMB admission letters to the candidates.

== Practice platforms ==
The Joint Admission and Matriculation Board is yet to officially approve a certified CBT practice platform for candidates. However, with growing concern over the performance of candidates in these computer-based tests, considering the fact that Nigeria is a developing country with a sizeable number of school children having little to no access to computers & the internet, a number of independent contributors have provided practice platforms with thousands of past questions to help candidates prepare and boost their performance in the actual test.

== Leadership ==
- Segun Aina, Registrar (New tenure beginning July 31st 2026)
- Is-haq Oloyede, Registrar (Tenure ending July 31st 2026)
