= West African Examinations Council =

Examination body in West Africa

- Abbreviation: WAEC
- Services: Examinations and academic assessments
- Official language: English
- Website: www.waecheadquartersgh.org www.waecgh.org www.waecnigeria.org www.waecdirect.org

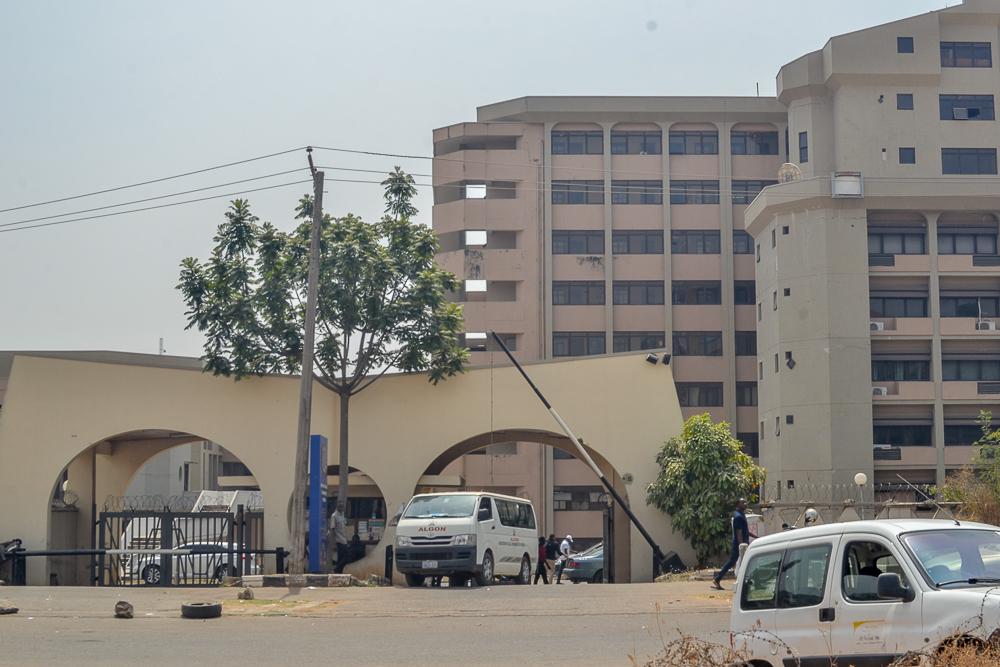
WAEC Headquarters, Abuja

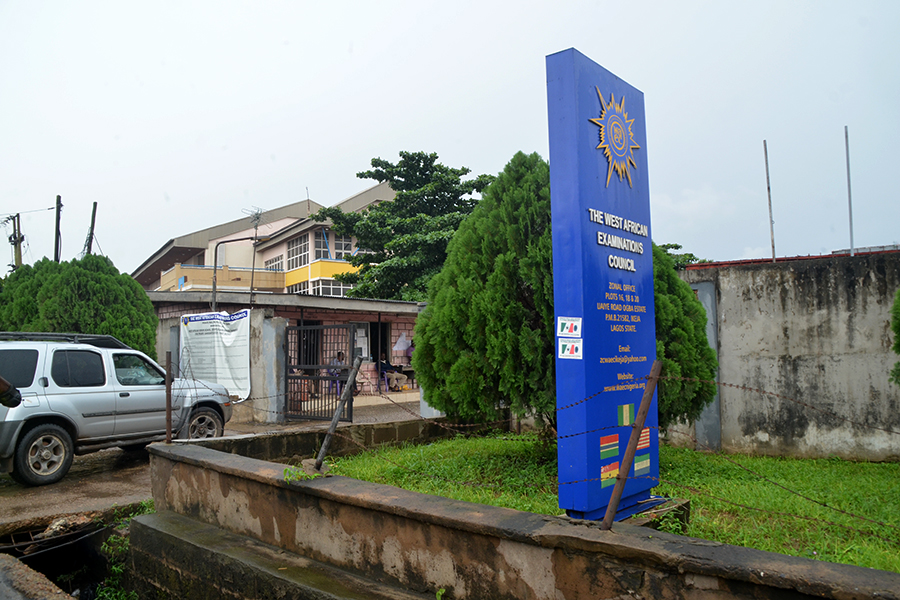
WAEC office, Ogba, Lagos

The West African Examinations Council (WAEC) is an examination board for English-speaking West African countries. Established in 1952, the council conducts exit examinations in 5 English-speaking countries of West Africa (Ghana, Nigeria, Sierra Leone, Liberia, and the Gambia). The council has an endowment fund to contribute to education in West Africa through lectures and aid to those who cannot afford education. In a year, over three million candidates registered for the exams coordinated by WAEC.

== History ==
The University of Cambridge Local Examinations Syndicate, the University of London School Examinations Matriculation Council, and West African Departments of Education met in 1948 concerning education in West Africa. They appointed Dr. George Barker Jeffery (Director of the University Of London Institute Of Education) to visit some West African countries so as to see the general education level and requirements in West Africa. At the end of Jeffery's three-month visit (December 1949–March 1950) to Ghana, the Gambia, Sierra Leone, and Nigeria, he tendered a report (since known as the Jeffery Report) strongly supporting the need for a West African Examination Council and making detailed recommendations on the composition and duties of the council. Following this report, the groups met with the governments of these countries, and they agreed on establishing a West African Examination Council, fully adopting Jeffery's recommendations.

=== The Establishment of the Council ===
The legislative assemblies of Nigeria, Ghana, Sierra Leone, and the Gambia passed an ordinance (West African Examinations Council Ordinance No. 40) approving the Examination Council in December 1951. The Ordinance agreed to the coordination of exams, and issuing of certificates to students in individual countries by the West African Examination Council. Liberia later issued their ordinance in 1974, at the annual meeting held in Lagos, Nigeria. After the success of forming an examination council, the council called a first meeting in Accra, Ghana, in March 1953. In the meeting, the registrar briefed everybody about the progress of the council. In that same meeting, five committees were formed to assist the council. These committees are: Administrative and Finance Committee, the School Examinations Committee, the Public Service Examinations Committee, the Professional, Technical, and Commercial Examinations Committee, and the Local Committee. The total number of people present for this meeting was 26.

== Issuing of Digital Certificates ==
In 2022, the Council launched a digital certificate access and confirmation platform, which provides a secure web- and mobile-based application that enables users to access, share, and confirm certificates. The digital certificates offer a convenient and secure way for individuals to access and share their academic achievements.

== Issues ==
There have been some concerns about the efficiency of WAEC as a body. An important episode was an examination leakage scandal in the 1970s, called the Owosho scandal. The scandal was a result of leakage of examination answer slips to students by an official prior to the conduct of the exam. This led to the cancellation of results in some examination centers and some students were asked to take the exam with their juniors the following year. Also in 1977, there was a much wider examination of leakage and malpractice at examination centers which led to what was termed EXPO 77.

By 1982, there were allegations that exams were sold and to combat these types of malpractices, examinations were cancelled at some centers affecting both innocent and guilty students.

The organisation as a whole has failed to keep a rigorous and challenging curriculum. In 2019, WAEC still offers students the option to study subjects like shorthand. One may argue that the lack of an efficient examination body is one of the reasons why the performance of youth in west African countries pale in comparison to western and sub continental counterparts. The fact that the syllabus still remains what it was when the organisation was first founded is proof of the lack of an effective body.

On 16 August 2020, the day before the commencement of WASSCE, there was an alleged circulation of the mathematics paper scheduled for 17 August on social media. However, the council swiftly debunked the reports, described them as fake, and typical of scammers every other examination year. In an interview with the News Agency of Nigeria, Mr. Patrick Areghan, WAEC Head of National Office reacted to the reports widely circulated on social media, saying it was " false, malicious, misleading and wicked".

On 4 November 2025, the Head of Public Affairs at WAEC, John Kapi, clarified that the West African Examinations Council (WAEC) has dismissed reports in the media suggesting that the results of more than 34,000 candidates have been withheld over alleged examination malpractice.

== See also ==
- WASSCE
- NECO
