= National Examination Council (Nigeria) =

Nigerian examination board

National Examinations Council
- Abbreviation: NECO
- Formation: April 1999; 27 years ago
- Type: SSCE Examination body
- Purpose: Educational
- Region served: Nigeria, Benin Republic, Togo, Republic of Niger, Equatorial Guinea, Côte d’Ivoire, and Saudi Arabia
- Services: SSCE, BECE, and NCEE examinations
- Registrar: Ibrahim Dantani
- Website: Official website

The National Examinations Council (also known as NECO) is an examination body in Nigeria that conducts the Senior Secondary Certificate Examination and the General Certificate in Education in June/July and November/December respectively.

== History ==
NECO was formed and established during the military regime of former Head of State Abdulsalami Abubakar in April 1999 after he succeeded General Sani Abacha. It was the first Federal organization to offer subsidized registration to academic candidates in Nigeria.

=== Mandates ===
NECO was mandated to take over the responsibilities of the National Board of Education Measurement (NBEM). Its debut took place in mid-2000.

== Administration ==
When it was headed by Abubakar M. Gana, appointed by the President under section 9(1) of its establishing Act. It has six departments, each headed by a director. Each Department has divisions, composed of units. A team of directors and a registrar are the governing body, which is headed by chair Abubakar Mohammed.

=== Senior Secondary Certificate Examination (internal and external) ===
Nigeria offers six years of basic education, three years of junior secondary education, three years of senior secondary education, and four years of tertiary education. Mathematics and English language are compulsory though Mathematics may not be required for some courses in higher institutions.

=== Basic Education Certificate Examination (BECE) ===
Basic Education Certificate Examination (BECE) is the main examination to qualify students for admission into secondary and vocational schools in Ghana and Nigeria. It is written after three years of junior high school education.

=== National Common Entrance Examination ===
The National Common Entrance Examination is administered to pupils in their 6th year of basic education for admission into Federal Unity Colleges. Two examinations are held annually.

On 15 July 2013, it was rumoured that there were plans made by the Federal Government of Nigeria to scrap the National Examinations Council (NECO) as part of a restructuring of government parastatals.The then Minister of Education, Professor Ruqayyatu Rufa'i, debunked those claims.
