= Abdalla Uba Adamu =

Nigerian academic

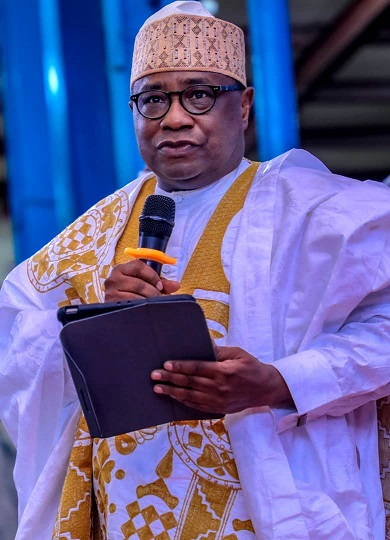
- July 2021, Presentation at the Coronation of His Royal Highness, the Emir of Kano, Alhaji Aminu Ado Bayero as the 15th Fulani Emir of Kano, Nigeria

Vice-Chancellor, National Open University of Nigeria (NOUN)
- In office 2016–2021
- Preceded by: Prof. Vincent Ado Tenebe
- Succeeded by: Prof. Olufemi Peters

Personal details
- Born: April 25, 1956 (age 70) Kano, Nigeria
- Education: University of Sussex; University of London; Ahmadu Bello University
- Profession: Academic
- Website: Official website

Abdalla Uba Adamu (born 25 April 1956) is a Nigerian academic, educator, publisher, filmmaker, ethnomusicologist, media scholar and former vice-chancellor of National Open University of Nigeria. He hold double professorships in Science Education (1997) and Media and Cultural Communication (2012).

He taught media and science education courses in many Nigerian universities and around the world; including serving as a European Union Visiting Professor at University of Warsaw, Poland, in 2012, visiting professor at Rutgers University, New Jersey, and visiting professor at University of Florida in 2010. He was Fulbright African Senior Research Scholar at the Center for Studies in Higher Education, University of California, Berkeley, 1991-1992.

In his contribution to the development of Hausa language in modern era, he developed 'hooked' Hausa language character font sets (ɓ Ɓ ɗ Ɗ ƙ Ƙ), which were not present at the advent of the word processors in Nigeria in the 1990s. He named them 'rabi'at' (after his mother, Rabi'at Muhammad) and 'abdalla' (after himself, as he could not think of any name at the time).

== Early life and education ==
Adamu was born in Daneji, Kano city, Kano State, on April 25, 1956. He received his undergraduate B.Sc. (education) degree in education, biology and physiology in 1979 at Ahmadu Bello University. He did his National Youth Service at a high school in Umoarkrika, Imo State, teaching biology and agricultural science.

He was employed as the first graduate assistant in science education in Bayero University Kano in July 1980. After a year, he was sponsored by the Kano State Government to study for M.A. science education at Chelsea College, University of London from 1982 to 1983. At Chelsea College, he was tutored by direct students of Karl Popper and subsequently became influenced by Popper's theories on the Philosophy of Science. On return to Bayero University, he re-oriented his Science Education classes towards Popper's theories, in particular falsification and conjectures and refutations. He subsequently developed both undergraduate and postgraduate courses on History and Philosophy of Science in the Department of Science and Technology Education where he domiciled at the time. He served as Head of Department of Education (1995-1998, 1999-2001), Head of Department of Science and Technology Education (2010-2013). Additionally, he served as director, management information systems (MIS) in Bayero University Kano from 1999 to 2004.

In October 1985 he became the first Kano State indigene to be awarded the British Commonwealth Scholarship which enabled him to proceed to Sussex University where he studied for his D.Phil. in Science Education with focus on Human Resource Development under the tutelage of Keith Lewin. Titled Science, schooling and manpower production in Nigeria: a study of Kano state science secondary schools, 1977-1987, his research explored the role of Science Education policies in national development. He returned to Bayero University in 1988 and continued to raise up in academic ranks.

== Career ==
In 1991, Adamu was appointed Fulbright African Senior Research Scholar and given a place at the Center for Studies in Higher Education, University of California, Berkeley. During the year he was at Berkeley, was mentored by Sheldon Rothblatt, the Director of the Center at the time, and Martin Trow, who both encouraged his residency and intention to write about the transnational nature of Nigerian Higher Education by incorporating him into the History of the University cluster. During the Berkeley Residency he wrote a monograph, Reform and Adaptation in Nigerian University Curricula, published by Edwin Mellen Press, New York, in 1994. The monograph explores the transfer of educational influence and structures from the United States to Nigeria, and the substitution of British educational system in Nigeria in the process. He was also Resident at the Rockefeller Foundation's Bellagio Resident Fellows program at the Bellagio Study Center, Bellagio, Italy, October to November 1993. During the Rockefeller Residency, he developed a monograph on the introduction of the American-style course unit system into the academic structure of Bayero University and the challenges such process faced. Thus, his main focus in Education were comparative higher education, curriculum and indigenous science education and science policy development.

In 1991 he participated in a UNESCO project on Planning science education provision in general secondary schools directed by Françoise Caillods with Gabriele Göttelmann-Duret and curated by Keith Lewin. The project led to the publication of a series of policy monographs targeted at Ministers of Education of various countries published by International Institute of Educational Planning. Adamu's contribution was Operation, efficiency and desirability of special science schools at secondary level: the Nigerian experience.

Adamu become professor of Science Education and Curriculum Studies in 1997. In 2004 he presented his Professorial Inaugural Lecture, Sunset at Dawn, Darkness at Noon: Reconstructing the Mechanisms of Literacy in Indigenous Communities to the University community in which he explored the use of Arabic alphabet as Hausa language literary device—the resultant script being labeled 'Ajami' (non-Arabic). He was listed in Who's Who in Science Education Around the World (International Council of Science Education/Unesco, 1991).

=== Media Studies ===
From 1996, the public Islamicate culture in Kano started voicing out concerns and criticisms about the new wave of Hausa prose fiction that has started to become popular, particularly among Hausa school girls and married women in purdah. The fiction, similar to Mills & Boon romantic stories were referred to as Littattafan Soyayya (Romantic Fiction). The Hausa romantic stories had started being written since 1980 and it took a decade for the Hausa public culture in Kano to note their overwhelming popularity. The novelists were accused of promoting immoral behavior because of their romantic themes. Predominantly popular, the genre became dominated by women writers with stories to tell about domestic lives of fairly typical Hausa married women. A censorship regime was instituted in 2001, and in 2007 a 'book burning' event was held in Kano to 'cleanse' the romantic fiction of its perceived immorality, Newly written story books with moral themes were given out instead to school girls, from whom the burnt novels were seized.

Having felt saturated in studies in Education with its main focus on policy dialogues, Adamu had, by 1996, switched his research interest to interrogating the interface between the new Hausa entertainment media forms and the Hausa Islamicate public culture. By then, the Islamicate public in Kano had started noticing the transformation of the Hausa popular cultural industries from its staid traditional orientation with focus on African Muslim traditional family values, to an emergent variety that was increasingly become transglobal, with Hindi films strongly influencing the Hausa entertainment forms, especially in music, literature and video film production. This transformation was spearheaded by the Hausa prose fiction romantic writers who eventually migrated and formed the Hausa video film industry that was officially and commercially launched in March 1990 in the city of Kano, thus earning it the sobriquet of 'Kannywood' in 1999. This became the first label of an indigenous film industry in Africa. In 2020 the term entered into The Oxford English Dictionary as a legitimate word. The other term connected to Nigerian cinema, Nollywood, was coined in 2002 by Norimitsu Onishi of The New York Times.

While Kannywood refers to Hausa Cinema, Nollywood refers to Nigerian Cinema in the official English Language of the Federal Republic of Nigeria. Adamu is therefore one of those advocating for Hausa Cinema rather than Kannywood. This was because the term Kennywood has spatial roots in Kano, northern Nigeria which was the center for the production, censorship and distribution and consumption of Hausa films. With the availability of internet and greater involvement of Hausa communities in Congo, Cameroon, Chad, Togo, Ghana and Niger Republic actively producing Hausa-language films, the term Kannywood therefore becomes anachronistic.

Subsequently, he embedded himself into the community of novelists, scriptwriters, producers, directors, actors and cinematographers in Kano, getting an in-depth perspective of their art and craft as part of what Victor Turner and Edward Bruner refer to as the "anthropology of experience". From 1999 he started his foray into discourse on media and cultural communication through documenting Hausa prose fiction, commonly referred to as Kano Market Literature.

With the formal starting of the Hausa video film industry in March 1990, many of the Hausa prose fiction romantic writers migrated to the video film with the intention of converting their prose fiction into video film. Adamu migrated with them to then new medium, further embedding himself in the new entertainment ecosystem. These pioneer writers who turned into film makers and subsequently gave Hausa Cinema its ethnographic focus included Ado Ahmad Gidan Dabino, Balaraba Ramat Yakubu, Bala Anas Babinlata and Ɗan Azumi Baba Ceɗiyar ƴan Gurasa.

Against the backdrop of censorship regime by a newly introduced Shari'a constitution in the State of Kano in 2000, Adamu immersed himself in a study of the outcomes of the censorship regime and popular culture in the Islamicate society of Kano. In 2001 he stablished early social networks on defunct Yahoo! Groups to discuss Hausa music, literature and video films in an increasingly interconnected world. This attracted a series of debates centered on the relationship between popular culture and Muslim Hausa traditional values. In 2003 he organized an international conference on Hausa video films, the first of its kind in Nigeria. The conference led to the establishment of Center for Hausa Cultural Studies in Kano that focused attention on the transnational flow of media to African Islamic societies and the public reaction to such media emergence. The Center also published the proceedings of the conference as Hausa Home Videos: Technology, Economy and Society, which presents the first academic study on indigenous language films in Nigeria. The conference opened up Hausa video films to international studies, drawing researchers from the US, UK and Europe.

Thus, from 2001 to 2023 he helped to establish Hausa Cinema Studies as an academic focus of study, leading to many theses and dissertations on the subject. For instance, in 2006 he delivered Mary Kingsley Zochonis Lecture for the African Studies Association, UK Biennial Conference at the School of African and Oriental Studies, University of London on 12 September 2006. The lecture was subsequently published in Kano as Transglobal Media Flows and African Popular Culture: Revolution and Reaction In Muslim Hausa Popular Culture.

Within Bayero University Kano campus, he participated in academic activities in the Department of English and Department of Mass Communication where he shared his field experiences during seminars and book collectives. He rooted his studies in Frankfurt School's critical theory, with particular focus on Jürgen Habermas whose private sphere/public sphere dichotomy Adamu found appealing as it applies to critical studies of Islamicate public culture. He also adopted Marshal Hodgson's concept of Islamicate culture as an analytical framework in his subsequent studies of Muslim Hausa entertainment culture.

His research started gaining visibility with an invitation to participate in The Media and the Construction of African Identities conference held in Kenya in 2004. This led to the publication of the proceedings as Media and Identity in Africa edited by Kimani Njogu and John Middleton. During the Kenyan meeting, he was introduced to Heike Behrend, one of the founders of media anthropology, and then the Director ofInstitute of African Studies, University of Cologne who invited him to address her postgraduate class at the University. His presentation on Islam and censorship opened up debates in northern Nigeria about the role of media in Muslim affairs, especially as it affects women and cinematic representation. His lecture, delivered under the research cluster of Media and Cultural Communication on 15 November 2004 opened him to internationalization of Muslim Hausa popular culture which saw him collaborating with colleagues to explore the various perspectives of media and culture of the Hausa. These included Graham Furniss (School of Oriental and African Studies, University of London), Brian Larkin (Barnard College, Columbia University, New York), Till Förster (University of Basel, Switzerland), Joe McIntyre (University of Hamburg), Nina Pawlak (University of Warsaw, Poland), Mariusz Kraśniewski (Institute of Mediterranean Studies, Polish Academy of Science, Warsaw) and Ousseina Alidou (State University of Rutgers, New Jersey). Based on his new research focus, the Department of Mass Communication Bayero University Kano in 2005 offered him employment as a Lecturer (in addition to his tenured professorship at the Department of Science and Technology Education) in media technologies and cultural studies.

Adamu subsequently served as visiting professor at the School of Oriental and African Studies, University of London; University of Florida, Gainesville, the State University of New Jersey, Columbia University, New York; Universität zu Köln and the University of Basel. He also gave special lectures at the Freie Universität Berlin, Universität Hamburg, Universität zu Köln, Humboldt-Universität zu Berlin, and the Gutenberg-Universität Mainz.

In 2012 he was appointed European Union Visiting Professor for the project 'The Modern University' at the Department of African Languages and Cultures, University of Warsaw, Poland from 1 March to 31 May 2012. At Warsaw, he taught two courses: Transnationalism and African Popular Culture, and Oral Traditions in Local and Global Contexts.

Based on his research outputs, in 2012 the Bayero University Council appointed him Professor of Media and Cultural Communication – some fifteen years after his first professorship in Science Education in 1997. With this appointment, which included his transfer from the Faculty of Education to the Department of Mass Communication, Bayero University Kano, he became the first professor in the Nigerian University system to occupy two professorial chairs in two different disciplines and Faculties.

With his transfer to the Department of Mass Communication, the University tasked him with the responsibility of using his experience in curriculum design to convert the single Department into a Faculty of Communication. He was thus able to design the curricular structure of what came to the first Faculty of Communication in Nigeria which split the main Mass Communication program into six individual degree programs. Before this new structure could be implemented in Bayero University, however, the National Universities Commission (NUC), the Nigerian higher education regulator and accreditation body, in a system-wide revitalization and transformation officially unbundled Mass Communication studies in Nigerian Universities into nine degree programs and endorsed universities to establish a Faculty of Communication if they so wish. He was listed in Who's Who in Research - Film Studies (Intellect. 2013).

=== National Open University of Nigeria (NOUN) ===
He was the Vice-Chancellor of National Open University of Nigeria from February 10, 2016 to February 11, 2021. During his tenure in NOUN, he focused attention on raising the visibility of Open and Distance Learning especially for the disadvantaged and disenfranchised members of the Nigerian public. Specially targeted for free scholarship were persons living with disabilities, female nomadic children, female students in South Eastern Nigeria, individuals displaced by terrorist insurgency in the North East of Nigeria and who had to relocate to Internally Displaced Camps (IDP). He massively increased the number of NOUN Study Centers from 65 he found to 103 he left, with a combined enrolment of over 640,000 (from 245,000) students. He also instituted free scholarships to individuals in correctional centers, judging that since they do not earn any income, they were incapable of paying their way through schooling. This has resulted in the enrolment of over 700 correctional center inmates in various NOUN degree programs, with Peace and Conflict Studies leading the choice of study. For his services to NOUN, he was admitted as Honorary Fellow of the Commonwealth of Learning in 2019. At the end of his tenure in February 2021, spent a Sabbatical year at the Kaduna State University (KASU), Department of Mass Communication, returning to his Department of Information and Media Studies, Bayero University Kano at the end of his Sabbatical year in 2022 where he continued his teaching and research activities.

=== The Gutenberg Principle and Ajamization of Knowledge ===
Since 1996 Adamu had been proposing for what he referred to as 'Ajamīzatioin of Knowledge' as an alternative educational strategy for millions of Hausa Qur'anic school pupils to acquire contemporary education in a literary script they know, rather than Latin alphabet they struggle to learn or not learn at all as these conflicts with their Qurʾānic schooling. This will remove the perspective that education can only be delivered through Latin alphabet. Ajamī script is the use of Arabic letters for non-Arabic languages, of which Hausa is one of them. Being literate in Qurʾānic sciences gave Muslim Hausa the ability to use the Arabic alphabet in different contexts from the Qur'an—thus creating Ajamī. He argued that their familiarity with the script through six-year period of learning the Qur'an sufficiently empowers them to master the script and use it in non-religious setting—thus enhancing their literacy. This was done with Urdu, Persian, and many other Arabic-script based languages.

In 2017, SIL International, as part of a Hausa Bible translation initiative, released Alƙalami TrueType font that renders the Hausa Arabic Warš (locally referred as Warsu) Ajamī script more accurately visually than the standard Ḥafs Arabic letters. The Alƙalami font was an Arabic script font and targeted for users in Niger and Nigeria. It was released as a modified Etincelle font originally created for SIL by Becca Hirsbrunner Spalinger who graduated from the MATD program at the University of Reading in 2015. Etincelle was her graduation project. The font was the first attempt to create a visually appealing font that approximates the handwritten Hausa Ajamī manuscripts commonly available in the Kano Kurmi market and based on the template of Sharu Bala Gabari's hand-written calligraphic Warš style of writing the Qur'ān. The font was developed for the purpose of translating the Bible into Hausa Warš script tradition—a common literacy skill of millions of Hausa Qur'ānic school pupils, their teachers, and general Muslim Hausa. The Bible Society of Nigeria had also translated the Bible into Hausa Ajami Ḥafṣ script based on Kigelia font and is available as an application for devices.

With the Alƙalami font in the public domain, Adamu embarked on a digitization project in 2022 that rendered the previously Warš hand-written documents on the history of Kano into the new Alƙalami rendition for public use. This was a second stage of his Ajamīzation of Knowledge—using Arabic Ajamī script for general, rather than exclusively religious education. Support in the project was rendered by Abdullahi Abba Dalhatu who converted the Hausa translation of the Holy Qur'ān by Abubakar Mahmud Gumi into the Alƙalami Warš version. The Alƙalami-rendered Hausa Qur'ān was to be converted into an application and uploaded to Google Play for easy download by the target audiences—the Muslim Hausa. A newspaper, Tabarau, was also published with the Hausa Alƙalami Warš script—making it the first in modern times, as the previous Hausa Ajamī newspaper in Kano, Alfijir, relied on Arabic Ḥafs script, which accounts for its lack of acceptance among readers as it was considered an 'Arabic' newspaper, despite being written in Hausa.

Over his career, Adamu was admitted into two Nigerian learned societies. He was first admitted as Member, Nigerian Academy of Education (NAE) in (2002) and then Member, Nigerian Academy of Letters (NAL) in 2018. Additionally, he is a strong member of African Council for Communication Education (ACCE), Association of Communication Scholars and Professionals of Nigeria, (ACSPN) and Association of Media and Communication Researchers of Nigeria (AMCRON).

== Festschrifts in the Honor of Abdalla Uba Adamu ==
- 2021. Educational Issues, Developments and Innovations. Festschrift in Honour of Abdalla Uba Adamu. Edited by U.S.A. Osuji. Abuja: National Open University of Nigeria Press. ISBN 978-978-058-068-1.
- 2021. Pedagogy: Teaching and Learning in Contemporary Nigeria. A Festschrift in the Honour of Abdalla Uba Adamu. Edited by Hakeem Ibikunle Tijani & Adegbite Tobalase. Houston, Texas: Africa Diaspora Press. ISBN 978-978-53893-5-7,
- 2017. Media, Knowledge Transfer and African Identity. A Festschrift in Honour of Abdalla Uba Adamu, Edited by Sa'idu Ahmed Ɓaɓura and Nura Ibrahim. Kano: Bayero University Press, 2017. ISBN 978-978-54522-6-6.

== Selected Books ==
- 2022. Status of Online Learning in Nigeria. British Columbia, Canada: Commonwealth of Learning, 2022. doi:10.56059/11599/4070.
- 2007. Transglobal Media Flows and African Popular Culture: Revolution and Reaction in Muslim Hausa Popular Culture: Visually Ethnographic Productions, 2007. ISBN 978-9788109488.
- 2007. Chieftaincy and Security in Nigeria: Past, Present, and Future (ed): Lagos, Tellettes Consulting Company. ISBN 978-810940-3
- 1993. Reform and Adaptation in Nigerian University Curricula, 1960-1992: Living on the Credit Line: New York, Edwin Mellen Press, 1993. ISBN 978-0773494220.
- 1992, Operation, efficiency and desirability of special science schools at the secondary education level: The Nigerian experience. Paris: International Institute of Educational Planning, UNESCO.

== Selected Book Chapters/Articles ==
- 2023. The Thousand and One Nights as Nigerian Literature. In Paulo Lemos Horta (Ed.)., Approaches to Teaching the Thousand and One Nights, (pp. 153–160). New York: Modern Language Association of America. ISBN 9781603295963.
- 2023. "Komai Nisan Dare, Akwai Wani Online": Social Media and the Emergence of Hausa Neoproverbs. Humanities 12(3), 44, pp. 1–14. doi:10.3390/h12030044J.
- 2022. Media, Post-Truth and Information Disorder in Hausa Political Communication. Journal of Communication and Media Research (JCMR), 14(1), pp. 12–18. ISSN 2141-5277.
- 2022. Genesis to Revelation: The Emergence of Kannywood Film industry. In D. Gambo, The Media Industry in Northern Nigeria, 1930-2020 (pp. 283–315). Jos: University of Jos Press. ISBN 9789789964253.
- 2021. Popular Culture in Muslim Africa. In Østebø, T. (Ed.). Handbook of Islam in Africa (1st ed.). (pp. 281–292). Routledge. ISBN 9781032127422.
- 2021, Inclusive Rapport: Nation, Language, and Identity in Nigeriène and Nigerian Hausa Rap Music. In Pepetual Mforbe Chiangong & Susanne Gehrmann (Eds.). Crossings and Comparisons in African Literary and Cultural Studies, (pp. 153–174). Trier: WVT Wissenschaftlicher Verlag. ISBN 978-3-86821-934-0.
- 2021. "There Goes the Neighborhood.": Film Soundstages and the Islamicate Public in Northern Nigeria. In Kristian Petersen (Ed.). Muslims in the Movies: A Global Anthology (pp. 206–218). Cambridge, MA: Harvard University Press. ISBN 9780674257788.
- 2021. Genesis to Revelation: Literature Bureau, Literary Associations and the Hausa Novel. In Adamu, Y. (Ed.). Hausa Prose Fiction: A Reader. pp. 25–56. Kano: Bayero University Press. ISBN 9789785645248.
- 2021. The Intangible Migrant: Language, Migration and Identity. International Journal of Migration and Global Studies, 1(1): 38-62. National Open University of Nigeria (NOUN). ISSN 2782-7534.
- 2020. Islamic Calligraphy, Abstraction and Magic in Northern Nigeria. In Toyin Falola Fallou Ngom & Mustapha Kurfi (Eds.). The Palgrave Handbook of Islam in Africa (pp. 303–336). New York: Macmillan/Palgrave. doi:10.1007/978-3-030-45759-4.
- 2020. Gender and Delineation of Intimisphäre in Muslim Hausa Video Films. In: Brunn S., Kehrein R. (eds) Handbook of the Changing World Language Map (pp. 1805–838). Cham: Springer. ISBN 978-3-030-02437-6.
- 2020. "We Are Not in Baghdad Anymore": Textual Travels and Hausa Intertextual Adaptation of Selected Stories in 1001 Nights." In Orhan Elmaz (Ed.). Endless Inspiration: One Thousand and One Nights in Comparative Perspective (pp. 35-59). Piscataway, NJ: Gorgias Press. ISBN 9781463241872.
- 2020. "Nigeria". In Wells, Karen (ed.). Teen Lives around the World [2 volumes]: A Global Encyclopedia. Vol 1 - Australia to Nigeria, pp. 329–340. Santa Barbara, California: ABC-CLIO. ISBN 9781440852442.
- 2020. Suna Linzami: Hausa Names as Ethnographic Markers. Algaita, 3(1), 1-15 (Bayero University, Kano). ISSN 2141-9434.
- 2019. Transcultural Language Intimacies: The Linguistic Domestication of Indian Films in the Hausa Language. In Kenneth Harrow and Carmela Garritano (Eds.). Companion to African Cinema (pp. 157–175). Chichester: John Wiley & Sons Limited. ISBN 978-1-119-10031-7.
- 2019. The Political Economy of the Hausa Popular Cultural Industries. Politique africaine n°153, p. 59-84. ISBN 9782811126971.
- 2019. Hausa Popular Music (Northern Nigeria, pp. 168–178), Hip-Hop in Nigeria (Hausa Rap, pp. 258–260). In David Horn, John Shepherd, Gabrielle Kielich, and Heidi Feldman (eds.) Bloomsbury Encyclopedia of Popular Music of the World, Volume 12: Genres: Sub-Saharan Africa, . New York: Bloomsbury. ISBN 9781501342028.
- 2018. Hausa Language and Literature. In Thomas Spear (Ed.). Oxford Bibliographies in African Studies. New York: Oxford University Press. doi:10.1093/OBO/9780199846733-0202.
- 2017. Transcultural Connections - Hindi Films, Transborder Fandom and Muslim Hausa Audiences in Northern Nigeria, African and Asian Studies 16: 103-127. doi:10.1163/15692108-12341373.
- 2017. Controversies and Restrictions of Visual Representation of Prophets in Northern Nigerian Popular Culture. Journal of African Media Studies, 9 (1): 17-31. doi:10.1386/jams.9.1.17_1.
- 2017. Education for Development - Theoretical Perspectives and the Nigerian Situation. Jerrold Keilson & Michael Gubser (Eds.). The Practice of International Development (pp. 215–232). New York: Routledge. doi:10.4324/9781315098432.
- 2016. Tribute to Hajiya Sa'adatu Ahmad Barmani Choge, Griotte, northern Nigeria, 1948-2013. The Annual Review of Islam in Africa, Issue No. 12/13, pp. 166–172. (University of Cape Town, South Africa).
- 2016. Media-Mediated Urban Sexuality and Islamicate Popular Culture in Northern Nigeria. In Muhammad O. Bhadmus (Ed.). The Nigerian Cinema: Reading Nigerian Motion Pictures (pp. 349–372). Ibadan: Spectrum Book Limited. ISBN 978-978-926-417-9.
- 2016. Trans-fictional migration and inter-textual re-interpretation: The Grimm Brothers' tales in Muslim Hausa Literature. In Isma'ila A. Tsiga & M. O. Bhadmus (Eds.), Literature, history, and identity in northern Nigeria (pp. 101–128). Ibadan: Safari Books Ltd. ISBN 978-978-8431-87-9.
- 2015. The Remediation of Events: 9/11 in Nigerian Videos. In H. Behrend & T. Wendl (Eds.), 9/11 and its Remediations in Popular Culture and Arts in Africa (pp. 39–57). Berlin: Lit. Verlag. ISBN 9783643906274.
- 2015. Out of India, coming to Africa: The emergence of Kanywood, the Muslim Hausa video film industry in northern Nigeria, published as "Dall'India all'Africa. La nascita di Kanywood: l'industria dei video musulmani in lingua hausa, nel Nord della Nigeria". In A. Jedlowski & G. Santanera (Eds.), Lagos calling: Nollywood e la reinvenzione del cinema in Africa (pp. 135–166). Aracne editrice int. le S.r.l. ISBN 978-88-548-8850-0.
- 2015. PDP reloaded: Political mobilization through urban musics in Kano. Bayero Journal of Political Science (Maiden Edition), June 2014, pp. 65–89.
- 2014. The Beggar's Opera: Muslim Beggar-Minstrels and Street Oral Poetry Theatre in Northern Nigeria. In T. F. Deubel, S. M. Youngstedt & H. Tissières (Eds.), Saharan Crossroads: Exploring Historical, Cultural, and Artistic Linkages between North and West Africa (pp. 195–216). Newcastle upon Tyne: Cambridge Scholars Publishing. ISBN 1-4438-5826-9.
- 2013. Transgressing Boundaries: Reinterpretation of Nollywood Films in Muslim Northern Nigeria. In M. Krings & O. Okome (Eds.), Global Nollywood: Transnational Dimensions of an African Video Film Industry (pp. 287–305). Bloomington and Indianapolis: Indiana University Press. ISBN 9780253009234.
- 2012. Transnational Media Flows and Contra-Flows: Shifting Paradigms in South-South Entertainment Flows. Hemispheres – Studies of Cultures and Societies, 27: 5–32. Institute of Mediterranean and Oriental Cultures, Polish Academy of Sciences, Warsaw, Poland. ISBN 978-83-7452-064-5.
- 2012. Al-Hausawi, Al-Hindawi: Media Contraflow, Urban Communication and Translinguistic Onomatopoeia Among Hausa of Northern Nigeria. Studies of the Department of African Languages and Cultures (ALC), 46: 23-57. Department of African Languages and Culture, University of Warsaw, Poland. ISSN 0860-4649.
- 2012. "Go by appearances at your peril": The Raina Kama writers' association in Kano, Nigeria, carving out a place for the "popular" in the Hausa literary landscape. with Graham Furniss., Research in African Literatures, 43(4): 88-121. ISSN 0034-5210.
- 2011. Media Technologies and Literary Transformations in Hausa Oral Literature. In J. McIntyre & M. Reh (Eds.), From Oral Literature to Video: The Case of Hausa (pp. 45-80). Köln: Rüdiger Köppe Verlag. ISBN 978-3-89645-579-6.
- 2011. Eastward Ho! Cultural Proximity and the Eastern Focus in Hausa Fiction and Video. In J. McIntyre & M. Reh (Eds.), From Oral Literature to Video: The Case of Hausa (pp. 81-108). Köln: Rüdiger Köppe Verlag. ISBN 978-3-89645-579-6.
- 2010. Transnational flows and local identities in Muslim Northern Nigerian Films: From Dead Poets Society through Mohabbatein to So..." In H. Wasserman (Ed.). Popular Media, Democracy and Development in Africa (pp. 223–234). London: Rutledge. ISBN 978-0-415-57793-9.
- 2010. The Muse's Journey: Transcultural Translators and Domestication of Transnational Music in Hausa Popular Culture. Journal of African Cultural Studies, 22(1): 41–56.
- 2010. Islam, Shari'a and Censorship in Hausa Video Film. In M. Saul & R. A. Austen (Eds.). Viewing African cinema in the twenty-first century: FESCAPO art films and the Nollywood video revolution (pp. 63–71). Cleveland, Ohio: The University Press. ISBN 978-0-8214-1931-1.
- 2009. Media Parenting and Construction of Media Identities in Northern Nigerian Muslim Hausa Video Films. In J. Middleton & N. Kimani (Eds.). The Media and the construction of African Identities (pp. 171–186). London: International African Institute/Twanzega Communications. ISBN 9780748635214.
- 2008. The Hindi Cinema Factor in Hausa Video Film Soundtracks. In M. Slobin (Ed.). Global soundtracks: The culture of world film music (pp. 152–176). Connecticut: Wesleyan University Press. ISBN 9780819568823.
- 2006. Loud bubbles from a silent brook: Trends and tendencies in contemporary Hausa prose writing. Research in African Literatures, 37(3): 133-153.

== See also ==
- List of Nigerian film producers
