= Angela Little (academic) =

British-Manx academic

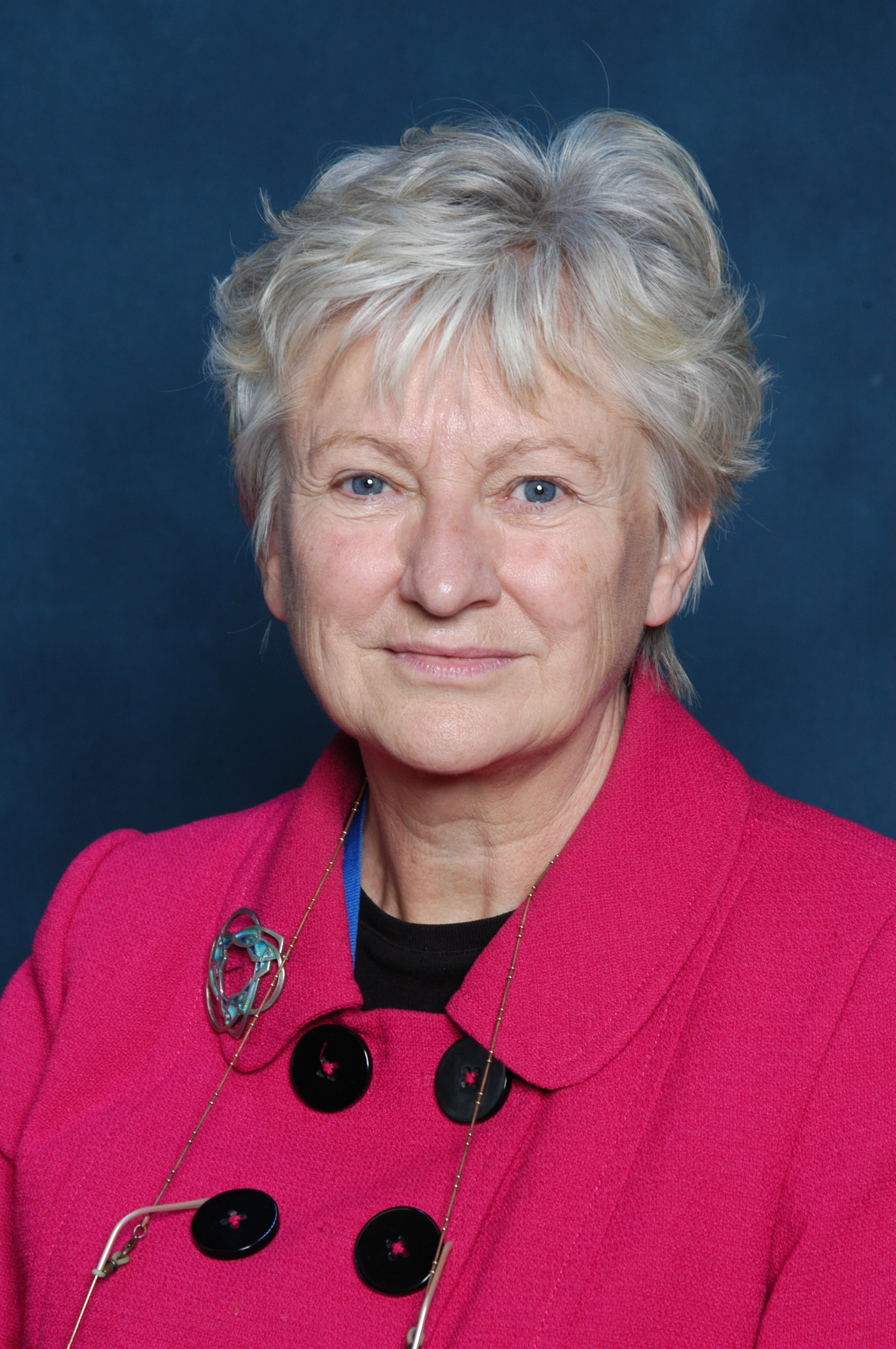
- Born: 24 December 1949 (age 76); Douglas, Isle of Man
- Education: University of Surrey (BSc 1971); Goldsmiths College, London University (PGCE 1974); University of Sussex (D.Phil 1982)
- Scientific career
- Fields: primary education policy and practice in developing countries, education planning, program evaluation
- Website: angelawlittle.net

Angela W. Little is Professor Emerita at the Institute of Education, University of London. She is known for her work in primary education policy and practice in developing countries as well as education planning, program evaluation and assessment. In particular she has focussed in seven main areas:

- Education for All and the Millennium Development Goals
- Multigrade education
- Globalisation and education
- Qualifications, motivation and aspirations
- Education in Sri Lanka
- Education in China
- Education and development

She has been adviser to various governmental, multilateral and non-profit organisations on education policy, planning and evaluation, including SIDA, the World Bank, DFID, UNESCO, ILO, the Ford Foundation, UNICEF, AusAid and others. Her country experience includes work in Sri Lanka, Ghana, Nigeria, Ethiopia, Zimbabwe, India, Bangladesh, Malaysia, Japan and China.

Little was Professor of Education and International Development at the Institute of Education, University of London between 1987 and 2010. She was previously a Fellow of the Institute of Development Studies at the University of Sussex. Little is Honorary professor at Zhejiang University and Flinders University, advisory professor at East China Normal University and Honorary Fellow at the University of Sussex.

She is a founding member of the London International Development Centre. She chairs the International advisory group for the Young Lives longitudinal study of 12,000 children in Ethiopia, India, Peru and Vietnam. She is a member of the Academy of Social Sciences and trustee of the United Kingdom Forum on International Education and Training.

Little is the author and/or editor of numerous books and monographs, six special journal issues, many journal articles, book chapters and reports. She has been involved in the direction of two films – The Diploma Disease (with Ronald Dore, released 1982) and The Qualification Chase (1996)

== Biography ==
Little was born in 1949 and grew up in Braddan and Port St Mary, Isle of Man. She attended Rushen Primary School and then Castle Rushen High School, one of the first comprehensive schools in Britain. From 1968 to 1971 she read social sciences at Surrey University where she graduated with a first class honours degree. She went to volunteer as a teacher of mathematics with Voluntary Service Overseas in Ijebu Ode, Nigeria. Subsequently, she attended the University of London and the University of Sussex to embark on a career in education and international development.

Little lives in Peel.

== Contributions to education and development ==
Little is well known in the field of international and comparative education for her approach to agency and actor perspectives alongside the structural approaches of sociology and economics. This involves questioning conventional behavioural assumptions in the social sciences used in analysing the processes of policy formulation and implementation, particularly at the levels of international agenda-setting and national adoption. The approach is perhaps best illustrated in her extensive body of work around 'Education For All' – a goal in whose pursuit Little has invested considerable intellectual and professional endeavour.

Little adopts an inter-disciplinary perspective, drawing concepts from development studies, social psychology, economics and sociology yet rooted in observation, experience and insight at the grass roots level. Her analyses emphasises agency alongside structure, resisting an approach implicit in much comparative work which subordinates the personal, local and national to the universal and global and assumes North-South conceptual transferability, paying little attention to context. Little views the interactions in the process of learning from the perspective of the learner and those in the process of development from the perspective of the actors and structural forces at the local and national levels. Her 1988 inaugural professorial lecture, Learning from Developing Countries, encapsulates the key tenets of her approach and remains both an influential contribution to the field and a key frame of reference for her own work.

In the 1994 book Beyond Jomtien: Implementing Primary Education for All, Little presents a range of initiatives from the 1970s and 80s which pre-dated the 1990 World Conference on Education For All (WCEFA) in Jomtien to universalise access to primary schooling, reminding followers of educational development that donor-led initiatives are only part of the Education For All story.

Her 1999 book, Labouring to Learn: towards a political economy of education and plantations in Sri Lanka, combines historical perspective with the seldom heard voice of Indian Plantation Tamils in Sri Lanka, unravelling their long and painstaking road to universal educational access over a period of a century and a half.

Little's 2006 book, Education for All and Multigrade Teaching: challenges and opportunities, traces the development of the current form and universal ideal of monograded teaching and argues that the de facto form of schooling for millions of learners and their teachers worldwide continues to be multigraded. She argues that the Education For All movement, alongside national governments, have ignored and continue to neglect this reality. Little argues for a radical reorientation of curriculum development and teacher education in recognition of multigrade systems in the pursuit of Education For All.

Little challenges assumptions in Human Capital Theory about education and productivity and about motivations for education and learning in her studies of learners and workers in Sri Lanka, Mexico, Ghana and Malaysia. She examines approaches to academic success and failure from across the social sciences, setting them against notions held by learners in a comparative study in the UK and Sri Lanka. Her work on motivation theory challenges the relationships assumed by the Diploma Disease thesis between intrinsic motivation and extrinsic motivation. Little's work on the globalisation of education questions the neo-liberal orthodoxy and addresses the neglected but central role of context in the determination of costs and benefits, by way of case studies covering China, India, Kenya and Sri Lanka.

== Publications ==
Selected books

- 2007, Education and Development in a Global Era: successful strategies for globalisation, (with A. Green, S. Kamat, M. Oketch, E.Vickers), DFID, Researching the Issues no 69, London (co-editor with Andy Green and contributor), 2007
- 2006, Education for All and Multigrade Teaching: challenges and opportunities, Springer, Dordrecht (editor and contributor), 2006
- 2003, Education for All: Policy and planning lessons from Sri Lanka, Researching the Issues, no 46, DFID, London
- 2003, Primary Education Reform in Sri Lanka, Isurupaya, Ministry of Education and Higher Education Publications Department (sole editor and contributor), 2000 (Sinhala and Tamil editions published in 2003)
- 1999, Labouring to Learn: towards a political economy of education and plantations in Sri Lanka, Basingstoke, Macmillan Press (English edition),
- 1999, Education, Cultures and Economics: dilemmas for development, New York and London: Falmer Press, (co-editor with Fiona Leach and contributor),
- 1996, Assessment in Transition: Learning, Monitoring and Selection in International Perspective, Pergamon, Oxford (co-editor with Alison Wolf and contributor).
- 1994, Educational Innovation in China: tracing the impact of the 1985 Reform (with Keith Lewin, Xu Hui and Zheng Ji Wei), Longman.
- 1994, Beyond Jomtien: Implementing Primary Education for All (co-editor with W, Hoppers and R. Gardner and contributor) Macmillan.
- 1987, Why do Students Learn? A Six Country Study of Student Motivation, Institute of Development Studies Research Report, Series Rr17, Sussex (sole editor and contributor).

Selected book chapters

- 2012, "Educational Progress among the Indian Tamil Minority in the Plantations of Sri Lanka", in Sleeter, C. et al. (eds.), School Education, Pluralism and Marginality: comparative perspectives, New Delhi, Orient Blackswan Private Limited.
- 2007, "Globalisation, Learning and Teaching" in S.Ali and M Rizvi (eds.), Quality in Education: teaching and learning in challenging times, Karachi: the Aga Khan University Institute for Educational Development.
- 2007, Paradoxes of Economic and Social Development in Sri Lanka: the Wages of Civil War, in A. Green, A.W.Little, S. Kamat, M.Oketch and E Vickers, Education and Development in a Global Era: successful strategies for globalisation, DFID, Researching the Issues, no 69, London.
- 2003, "Access and achievement in Commonwealth countries: support for learning and teaching in multigrade classrooms", in Matlin, S. (ed.) Commonwealth Education Partnerships London, TSO, 2003

Selected journal articles

- 2011, "Education policy reform in Sri Lanka: the double-edged sword of political will", Journal of Education Policy, 26 (4). pp. 499–512.
- 2011, Guest Editor of special issue on "The Policies, Politics and Progress of Access to Basic Education", Journal of Education Policy, 26 (4) (Editorial with Keith Lewin pp. 477–482).
- 2011, Guest Editor of special issue on "Access, Equity and Transitions in Education in Low Income Countries", International Journal of Educational Development, (editorial with Keith M Lewin), 2011
- 2010 (with others), "The Millennium Development Goals -a cross sectoral analysis and principles for goal setting post 2015", The Lancet, Sept 2010
- 2010, "International and Comparative Education: what’s in a name?", Compare, 40 (6), pp. 845–852.
- 2009 (with Andy Green), "Successful Globalisation, Education and Sustainable Development", International Journal of Educational Development, Vol 29, 2, pp. 166–174.
- 2008 (with Ricardo Sabates), "Economic Globalisation, Youth Expectations and Social Class: the case of Sri Lanka", International Journal of Educational Development, Vol 28, 708–722.
- 2008, "Primary Care, Public Service", Review: International Development Issue 12, December.
- 2007 (with Jane Evans), "The role of UK qualification suppliers in Sri Lanka and Zimbabwe: a comparative evaluation", International Journal of Educational Development, 27 (5), pp. 525–541.
- 2005 (with Jane Evans), "The growth of foreign qualification suppliers in Sri Lanka: de facto decentralisation?" Compare, 35 (2), 181–192.
- 2003, "Motivating Learning and the Development of Human Capital", Compare, 33 (4), 437–452.
- 2001, Special issue of the International Journal of Educational Development on the theme of Multigrade Teaching, 21 (6) (guest editor)
- 2000, "Development Studies and Comparative Education: context, content, comparison and contributors", Special number Comparative Education for the twenty first century, Comparative Education, 36 (3).
- 1992, "Learning and Working: elements of the Diploma Disease thesis examined in England and Malaysia" (with J Sarjit Singh) Comparative Education, 28, pp 181–200.

Selected monographs

- 2011, Access, Attendance and Achievement in Rural Schools in Sri Lanka (with H.N.Upul Indika and C. Rolleston) CREATE Pathways to Access Research Monograph No 73, London/Sussex, 2011
- 2010, The Politics, Policies and Progress of Basic Education in Sri Lanka, CREATE Research Monograph No. 38, London/Sussex.
- 2010, Access to Elementary Education in India: politics, policies and progress, CREATE Research Monograph No. 44. London/Sussex.
- 2010, Access to Basic Education in Ghana: politics, policies and progress, CREATE Research Monograph No. 43, London/Sussex.
- 2008, Education for All: politics, policies and progress, CREATE Research Monograph, no 13, pp 95.
- 2004, Learning and teaching in multigrade settings, Background paper for UNESCO EFA Global Monitoring Report 2005
- 1988, Learning from Developing Countries: An Inaugural Lecture Institute of Education, University of London, 1988
- 1982, Examination Reform and Educational Change in Sri Lanka, 1972–1982: Modernisation or Dependent Underdevelopment?, Institute of Development Studies Discussion Paper D180, 1982

Selected articles in popular press

- Bid for better world starts here, by Chloe Stothart and Jessica Shephard, article mentions Angela Little, Times Higher Education Magazine, 9 March 2007
- Where the sums add up to a way out of poverty – A review of Angela Little's book, Labouring to Learn, Times Higher Education Magazine, 19 May 2000
- Global vision takes seed in plantation schools – Times Higher Education Magazine, 21 April 2000
- Reaching For The Top – new internationalist 122, April 1983

== Collections ==
The Institute of Education holds a collection of books and pamphlets collected during the course of Little's research on Sri Lankan education. The collection was donated to the Institute by Little in 2006.
