= Bilkisu Funtuwa =

Nigerian writer

- Born: Funtuwa, Katsina State, Nigeria
- Citizenship: Nigerian
- Occupation: Novelist
- Writing career
- Language: Hausa
- Genres: Romance, Contemporary fiction
- Notable works: Allura Cikin Ruwa & Wa Ya San Gobe

Hajiya Bilkisu Salisu Ahmed Funtuwa is a Nigerian author. She writes novels in Hausa that focus on female Muslim protagonists. She is one of the best-known writers of what is known as "Kano market literature" or Littattafan Soyayya — "books of love".

Her novels combine themes of feminism and women's rights with issues relating to the Hausa people and Islam, drawing from her own experiences as a member of these groups. Bilkisu Funtuwa maintains the role that is expected of her and the religious practice of polygamy that constitutes the Hausa female's reality, and therefore writes about how to combat such circumstances. Funtuwa's works focus around female protagonists who use their education in combination with their religious devotion to elevate themselves to extraordinary success. These characters take on the careers of lawyers, doctors, and government officials while also leading charmed lives of wealthy businessmen. One of the most defined themes in her work is passionate love. Within her works, couples share relationships full of respect, intimacy, and mutually enjoyed pastimes. As well as focusing on women gaining more control of their families, her novels also encourage Muslim women to focus on education while maintaining their faith.

Funtuwa lives with her family in Funtua, Katsina State, Nigeria.

== Bibliography ==
- 1994: Allura Cikin Ruwa (Needle in a Haystack)
- 1996: Wa Ya San Gobe (Who Knows Tomorrow Will Bring?)
