= Malcolm Adiseshiah =

Indian development economist and UN official

Malcolm Adiseshaiah
- Born: Malcolm Sathyanathan Adiseshaiah; 18 April 1910; Vellore, Madras Presidency, British India
- Died: 21 November 1994 (aged 84)
- Education: Loyola College, Chennai, London School of Economics, University of Cambridge
- Occupations: Development economist, educator
- Spouses: Helen Paranjothi; Elizabeth Pothen
- Parent(s): Paul Varanasi Adiseshaiah, Grace Nesamma Adiseshaiah

Member of Parliament, Rajya Sabha
- In office 14 April 1978 – 13 April 1984
- Constituency: Nominated

Malcolm Sathiyanathan Adiseshiah (18 April 1910 – 21 November 1994) was an Indian development economist and educator. In 1976 he was awarded the Padma Bhushan, India's third-highest civilian award. In 1998, UNESCO created the Malcolm Adiseshiah International Literacy Prize in recognition of his contribution to education and literacy. He was nominated to the Rajya Sabha, the upper house of the Parliament of India, in 1978.

== Early years and education ==
Adiseshiah was born on 18 April 1910 in Vellore, Tamil Nadu. He is the second of the five children of Paul Varanasi Adiseshiah and Grace Nesamma Adiseshiah. His father was a professor of philosophy and the first Indian principal of Voorhees College, Vellore, Tamil Nadu State, India. His mother was a musician who had studied up to the Senior Cambridge (High School) and was the first woman Councilor of the Vellore Municipality. She taught her five children until they were ten years of age. Malcolm Adiseshiah obtained a doctorate in economics at the London School of Economics, William, the eldest brother, in philosophy at Cambridge, Padmini in education, and Noble in medicine.

Adiseshiah studied in Voorhees High School, where he obtained two double promotions. He completed his secondary school education at the age of thirteen to join Voorhees College for his 'intermediate' course (equivalent to +2 course now.) Then he shifted to Loyola College, Chennai, for his BA (Honours), where Ramaswamy Venkataraman, the former President of India, was his classmate. After a six-year teaching interregnum at the St. Paul's Cathedral Mission College in Calcutta (now Kolkata), he proceeded to King's College, Cambridge, for his MA (Banking) and then to the London School of Economics (1937–40) for pursuing his doctoral research with specialization in currency. Late Dr. R. N. Poduval, who served in FAO and then was Chairman of Centre for Research in Economic and Social Development, Chennai, was two years his junior in LSE.

In later life, after his retirement from UNESCO, Adiseshiah recalled his training and research"

under the wise guidance of Father Basneck and Professor P.J. Thomas in Madras, Benoy Kumar and Nalini Ranjan Sarkar in Calcutta, Percy Barrat Whale and John Maynard Keynes in London and Cambridge.

== Teaching career ==
In 1930 Adiseshiah joined as a lecturer in St. Paul's Cathedral Mission College, an affiliate of the University of Calcutta, and continued until 1936. He worked on planning a rural service program in the college in cooperation with the Visva-Bharati University associates at Sriniketan and Santiniketan.

In 1940, after obtaining his doctorate at the age of thirty, he joined Madras Christian College, Chennai, as its first professor and head of the economics department. His role and support for the British government in the notorious and deadly Bengal famines of 1940s is controversial. He remained there until 1946. Prof. K. N. Raj, founder of Centre for Developmental Studies, Tiruvananthapuram, and G. Jagathpathy, former Chief Secretary of the government of Madhya Pradesh, were his students in the 1941-44 batch of BA Honours course. Raj recalled this experience:

in the villages of Bengal and South India with their rural service centres where we worked out the economics of hand pound rice, hand-made paper, hand-loomed textiles, crop rotation and rural credit, rural medicine and sanitation, adult literacy and curriculum reform. It was there that I found the testing ground for the many ideas and plans that I carried with me to UNESCO in Paris and from there to the four corners of the earth.

His publications in the 1940s included books on banking, rural development, and agricultural transformation. He was engaged, with his fellow economists in the Madras University, in work on planning the future industrialization of India and Madras State.

== Personal life ==
Adiseshiah married Helen Paranjothi, with whom he had a son and a daughter. The separation process with Helen Paranjothi started in 1946, and the annulment of the marriage came in 1956. Adiseshiah then married Elizabeth Pothen, a history professor he met at the Madras Women's Christian College.

== UNESCO and UN service ==
From 1946 to 1948, Adiseshiah served as Associate General Secretary of the World University Service in Geneva. This association later helped him to support steps for the construction of the World University Service Centre in Chennai and women's hostels in Delhi and Rajasthan. During that period, he was also connected with the World Student Christian Federation and Student Volunteer Service.

From 1 to 16 November 1945, a United Nations Conference was convened in London to establish of an educational and cultural organization (ECO/CONF). In the conference, a new organization was created to establish the "intellectual and moral solidarity of mankind" and thus prevent the outbreak of another world war. The United Nations Educational, Scientific and Cultural Organization (UNESCO) was founded by thirty-seven countries. Its Constitution to promote collaboration between member states in the fields of education, science and culture was signed on 16 November 1945 and came into force on 4 November 1946. Sarvepalli Radhakrishnan, former President of India, was a former student of Adiseshiah's father. He made a referral to Sir Julian Huxley, then Director-General of UNESCO, who invited Adiseshiah to the organization in 1948. He was posted as deputy director of the department of exchange of persons. In that capacity, Adiseshiah signed the UNESCO Fellowship letter in 1949 to M. S. Swaminathan, eminent scientist, and administrator, to pursue research at the Agricultural University in Wageningen, the Netherlands, which was the starting point illustrious career.

In March 1950, Adiseshiah was promoted to the Director of technical assistance department, and he was one of its six top executives. Adiseshiah was authorized to represent the Director-General at the technical assistance board set up by the UN.

Rene Ochs, a fellow member of staff, who later rose to be a Director at UNESCO, wrote about this period:

The stage was set for the beginning of a new era. Everything was possible; yet everything remained to be done with non-existent resources. It was done, though in a surprisingly short time, by very few people, among whom Malcolm Adiseshiah held a prominent, if not a unique place. Those who had the privilege of working with him from the early years of technical assistance, and the following years of growing success and achievements, witnessed the outstanding performance of man whose extraordinary vision immediately recognized the opportunity offered, projected its potentialities into the future and made the dream come true. This required no less than the towering quality of his intelligence, his rare organizational ability and resourcefulness, his uncommon physical stamina, his unrelenting pace of work and unflinching dedication to the task at hand and a faith coupled with realism which carried mountains.

UNESCO's tentative proposals were submitted for Technical Assistance for Economic Development in 1950–51. Adiseshiah organized the new department, established area desks corresponding to UN geographical regions, instituted the procedures and methods of operation, and set up a 'report and information unit' which periodically produced a technical assistance bulletin.

In 1955, he was promoted as one among the three Assistant Directors General of UNESCO and put in charge of development.

The third stage of UNESCO's activities dates from the early sixties, when many African countries became independent and joined it. In 1962, he was promoted to the post of Deputy Director-General of UNESCO. Then he was the sole incumbent to that office. The UNESCO began organizing important regional conferences of ministers of education or ministers of sciences along with economic development ministries. The first Asian Ministers of Education Conference was held in Karachi in 1959 and the first conference for Africa in Addis Ababa in 1960.

In 1991, Sylvain Lourie, Assistant Director General of UNESCO, wrote:

Radical changes which had affected educational demand and supply are forcing a reconsideration of the very foundations of educational planning such as they prevailed in their heyday some 30 years ago, when Dr. Adiseshiah played a historical role, guiding UNESCO in setting regional targets for public spending on education throughout the world and in establishing UNESCO International Institute for Educational Planning.

Adiseshiah was responsible for developing the Karachi Plan for Universal Primary Education for Asia, the Addis Ababa and Santiago plans for the African and Latin American educational development, and the corresponding science plans for Asia, Africa, and Latin America. He worked with David Owen, Executive Chairman of the Technical Assistance Board, to convince donor countries since the financing of the expanded program rested on voluntary contributions made by them at pledging conferences. In the need of additional sources, he established relations with the International Development Association (IDA), Inter-American Development Bank, and other regional development banks. In 1962 UNESCO approached the World Bank, also known as International Bank for Reconstruction and Development (IBRD), for medium trade credit for funding a project in Tunisia. The IBRD, until then, was concentrating on investments in physical capital. Adiseshiah contributed to the persuasion to shift IBRD's focus exclusively from the expansion of physical capital towards the development of human capital, especially the extension of education. In 1964 he participated in negotiating the memorandum of understanding between the International Bank for Reconstruction and Development and UNESCO. He introduced flexibility in utilizing multilateral aid. Adiseshiah used a substantial part of USSR's contribution for technical assistance to establish IIT, Mumbai. The expanded technical assistance program was merged with the United Nations Special Fund to form the United Nations Development Programme (UNDP), which was launched in 1966. He formulated a program of technical and financial assistance in each country, which he started with a global outlay of $3 million per annum in 1950. When he retired from the organization, the outlay had increased to $300 million.

Adiseshiah said:

UNESCO has had a double responsibility. First it has had to coordinate the entire educational programmes of the United Nations family and give each part of the programme the expertise and help it needed. Secondly, for the UN system, it has had to act as the focal point and leader in all matters of education and science... there has been a continuing process by UNESCO of clarifying, refining and consolidating its own educational and scientific mandate. ... education and science also have wider connotations in their application to peace and understanding...

Adiseshiah kindled efficiency by arousing team spirit. He had mastered the art of training a team to fulfill the aspirations of the mission. He made two rounds of round the world trips each year which took him to as many as twenty-five countries in succession. He organized more than 120 projects in various countries for their economic and social development through education, science, and culture.

Adiseshiah visited the hundred and twenty-seven member states of the UN several times. He visited each one of the Third World countries that were becoming a member of the UNESCO, studied its economic situation first hand, assessed its need for literacy and education, and made recommendations as to how those needs could be met in the 'Mission Reports.' Each of the 'Mission Reports' was reported to be pioneering contributions about the specific regions on which the reports focused on the emerging discipline of development economics.

In 1970 the then Director-General, Rene Maheu, was reluctant to let him retire. Adiseshiah insisted on leaving. Rene Maheu obtained the sanction of the executive board of UNESCO to replace Adiseshiah with two Deputy Director-Generals.

There are in the UNESCO archives 118 Adiseshiah files covering approximately 48,000 pages.

As a UNESCO official, he rendered assistance to Indian projects. The publication of the UNESCO Art Album on Ajantha was mainly due to his yeomen efforts. It was due to his vision that the heritage sites of humankind must be preserved for all posterity.

UNESCO assisted in the setting up of the National Council of Educational Research and Training (NCERT), New Delhi: the establishment of first TV broadcasts in India; the reorganization of Films Division of India; the provision of twenty renowned Professors of engineering and science; the supply of $12 million worth of equipment to IITs of Bombay and Kharagpur; the expansion of aeronautical engineering in Madras Institute of Technology; and the provision of experts and equipment to Alagappa Chettiar College of Engineering and Technology in Madras (now Chennai), Tamil Nadu.

He was instrumental in rendering such assistance to all member nations of UNESCO, emphasizing to Asian, African, and South American countries.

After his retirement from UNESCO until 1991, he had visited countries of Africa, Latin America, and Asia at their invitation three times a year to advise them on their development plans.

In January 1981, Adiseshiah was elected chairman of the governing board of the UNESCO International Institute for Educational Planning (IIEP) for a five-year period. In 1986 he was re-elected for a second term for five years. In 1987, 1991, and 1992 he was the chairman of the jury for the selection of the international literacy prize winners. In 1989 he delivered the Presidential Address at the World Literacy Day function in Paris.

Adiseshiah was a member of the UN International Committee of Consultants on Environment. He was the co-coordinator of the UNESCO Working Group on the New International Economic Order. He reviewed India's experience with the UN during the first forty years of its existence in an assessment of the role of the International Bank of Reconstruction and Development (IBRD) and International Monetary Fund (IMF) and the powerful interests working behind the scenes in shaping their policies in a book which he edited.

== MIDS ==
In September 1970, Adiseshiah and his wife Elizabeth registered in Paris a trust fund for starting Madras Institute of Development Studies (MIDS hereafter). MIDS was conceived to undertake studies and research on developmental issues on the economy, polity, and society with particular reference to Tamil Nadu state. MIDS started functioning in January 1971 in one of their properties in Gandhinagar, Adyar, a Chennai suburb. Adiseshiah was its first director. Adiseshiah started publishing the publishing of 'Bulletin – Madras Development Seminar Series' in February 1971 and wrote its editorials every month from February 1971, covering international, national, and Tamil Nadu issues until his death. 'This surely' wrote Prof.S. Subramanian, in the prolegomena of the special issue of the Bulletin, bought out after his demise, 'is the stuff of which archives are made'.

As Dr. Barbara Harris-White of IDC, Oxford University writes,

It is more accurate to say that he enabled MIDS to be built. He created a place where motivated scholars could work at their projects with a minimum of direction or regulation. This kind of scholarly environment is now extremely rare anywhere in the world.

In the early 1990s, he apprehended that the Central and State governments might not fulfill their financial commitments to the institute to the fullest extent necessary. It made him sad. With his wide contacts, he, who had succeeded in finding resources for UNESCO's massive technical assistance program, could have easily raised additional resources for the institute had he solicited for it. But he was reluctant to ask. He, who insisted that all departments of Madras University should combine both teaching and research programs, failed to introduce a teaching program in his institute. Nor was he successful in the construction of accommodation for the doctoral scholars of his institute.

== Educationalist ==
His early teaching career, his Vice Chancellorship of the Madras University, and his various activities in his entire life had their focal point in education. A major part of his UNESCO service was spent formulating educational programs for the developing world.

The General Conference of UNESCO, in its fifteenth session, authorized the publication of a work designed to clarify the basic concepts concerning the contribution of education, science, and culture to develop. In the course of the discussions about the resolution, reference was made to the many speeches of Adiseshiah on related themes delivered in Oxford, United Kingdom in 1961; Cambridge, UK, and Tananarive, Madagascar in 1962; Madras, India in 1963; Toronto, Ontario, Canada in 1964; Washington, DC, USA in 1968 and many others. He was requested to write a book based on the facts and ideas presented in those speeches about that book, U Thant, then Secretary-General of the United Nations, in his 'Foreword' writes:

In his humanistic approach to the role of education, science and culture in the development process, Dr. Malcolm Adiseshiah has reviewed the past in order to seek improvement in the future. The philosophy of development set forth in this volume is a bright beacon which should help guide UNESCO successfully into the Second Development Decade.

That was the respect he commanded in the UN as an educationalist of eminence.

He undertook a survey of the school education in Tamil Nadu in the late 1970s and published an influential report. His contributions to the growth dynamics of education are numerous. These include the devising of the curricula for primary and secondary education, vocationalization, preparation of teaching material, the introduction of science and technology at appropriate levels, preparation of syllabi for a collegiate education, examination reform, giving a new thrust to the quality, content, direction, and methodology of social science research, compilation, and analysis of educational data and financing of education.

He was instrumental in setting up the Asian Social Science Research Council, New Delhi, and was its first President. He was a member of the Central Advisory Board of Education, the Indian National Commission for Co-operation with UNESCO, the Indian Council of Social Science Research (ICSSR), the National Council of Educational Research and Training (NCERT), and the National Council of Teacher Education. The ICSSR requested him to undertake a review of its work and suggest the lines it should develop. His meticulously compiled two-volume report, one on a retrospect and the other on the prospect, had been an influential guide in the development of social science of research in India at that period.

He was the chairman of the panel which reviewed the functioning of the Tata Institute of Social Sciences (TISS). Andhra University entrusted to him the review of the working of the social science departments at Waltair. He chaired the committee set up to recommend the establishment of Mother Teresa Women's University in Kodaikanal, Tamil Nadu.

== Non-formal education ==
Non-formal education to cover the vast multitudes that were denied a chance to join formal educational institutions was attempted in various forms in India. The Farmers Functional Literacy Project of 1967 was among the earliest attempts in India. Adiseshiah founded the Tamil Nadu Board of Continuing Education in 1976 and took all steps to sustain and advance its activities. He was its president for four terms. He chaired the Non-Formal Education Curriculum Preparation Committee in 1976. When the National Adult Education Programme (NAEP) was launched on 2 October 1978, Adiseshiah, then Vice-Chancellor of Madras University was appointed President of the Indian Adult Education Association. Soon he became a member of the Rajya Sabha and used the opportunity to expand the adult education program to cover all parts of the country.

He was president of the Viswayuvak Kendra. He was a member of the UGC Standing Committee on Adult Education. When the country launched the National Literacy Mission on 5 November 1988, Adiseshiah was the natural choice for its leadership. The Mission searched for an alternative agency and a strategy to create a country-wide churning for literacy and created the Bharat Gyan Vigyan Samithi (BGVS) in August 1989 and invited Adiseshiah to be its president. BGVS facilitated the shift of adult education from a government-controlled, government-sponsored program to acquire a status of a mass movement. Adiseshiah had the satisfaction of witnessing the declaration of Ernakulam district in Kerala as having achieved the status of total literacy on 4 February 1990. The new premises of the State Resources Centre of the Tamil Nadu Board of Continuing Education was named after him and was declared open on his 83rd birthday on 18 April 1992.

== Offer of Governorship ==
Late V. R. Nedunchezhiyan, who was a cabinet minister in the DMK and AIADMK ministries in Tamil Nadu, recalled the memorial meeting held in the Centenary Hall of the Madras University in December 1995 that Adiseshiah refused to accept the offer of a Governorship of a state in 1977. He said that a central cabinet minister asked Adiseshiah's consent for appointment as Governor of Goa. Adiseshiah immediately refused the offer stating that he was not willing to accept any task which would cause his long separation from his beloved MIDS. After consulting with the then Prime Minister of India, the central Cabinet minister offered Adiseshiah the Governorship of Tamil Nadu, knowing full well that it was against the prevailing convention that no person born in any state would be appointed governor of that state.

Adiseshiah was in a tight corner. He requested a day to make up his mind. The next day, during the morning constitutional along the Marina beach, he asked Nedunchezhian, who was his walk companion for many years, for his opinion about the offer. Nedunchezhian replied that Adiseshiah was always a man of action. The state governor was more a ceremonial post that would only put fetters around his multi-pronged activities. Later in the day, Adiseshiah conveyed to the central cabinet minister that he was not accepting the offer of the Governorship of Tamil Nadu. Nedunchezhian also recalled that it was the only occasion when Adiseshiah consulted him about a 'political' decision in his more than two decades of friendship! Surprisingly, Adiseshiah had sought the opinion of his staff, including his car drivers, whether he should accept the governorship or not!

== Parliamentarian ==
Adiseshiah was nominated to the Rajya Sabha in April 1978 for a six-year term as one of the twelve persons under the category of those having special knowledge and practical experience in literature, science, art, and social service. There were rapid changes in the composition of the central government during his term. He eschewed party politics. His erudition and experience were appreciated, and his speeches, mainly on economics and education, were listened to with respect. They were interspersed with homely proverbs and quotations. He urged quick redistribution of land. He recommended the imposition of income tax on rich peasants. He pleaded for a level playing field and opposed special concessions to non-resident Indians when they invested in India. He longed for larger two-way traffic between the Central and State Planning Commissions. He advocated a national energy policy. He opposed the nationalization of sick mills in the private sector. In education, he was opposed to haphazard expansion and steadfastly stood for consolidation. He provided a strong voice for teachers. As a humanist, he was deeply concerned with the reduction of poverty, especially in the rural areas. He showed his courage to dissent when the occasion demanded. He provided an outstanding example of a role model for what a nominated member of the Rajya Sabha should be.

== Author ==
Adiseshiah wrote elegant prose, lucid and precise. He was a prolific writer. He edited MIDS Bulletin for twenty-four years. Predictably a very major portion of his writings was on education in all its dimensions – literacy, school and higher education, adult education, women's education, non-formal education, continuing education, technical education, science education, university education, research methods, and the like. Social sciences commanded a great deal of his attention. But he had a much broader perspective. He had written extensively on the environment and edited a book on that theme. He was very concerned about nuclear energy. Globalization and the new international economic order drew a lot of his notice. Rural poverty and inequality were other of his core topics. Next to education, these occupied his prime attention. Price policy, foreign trade, economic planning, statistics, panchayat raj, and wasteland development are among the many areas on which he had written. His writings were marked by analytical rigor.

He employed all printed media such as books, reports, journals, magazines, and newspapers to carry his message. The final issue of MIDS Bulletin (Vol. XXV No.1, Nov. 1995) contains an incomplete list of his written material, classified into editorials, books, edited books, presidential addresses, convocation addresses, keynote addresses, inaugural addresses, valedictory addresses, journals/magazines, newspaper articles, papers for souvenirs/commemoration volumes /essays /surveys /books and miscellaneous papers /lectures. They cover a total of23 pages! They do not include his many volumes in the UNESCO archives, the numerous reports of committees and commissions in which he was a member, his writings in the period 1930–48, and most of his writings as Vice-Chancellor of Madras University.

== In the cause of Tamil and Tamil Nadu ==
Adiseshiah loved Tamil but was no chauvinist. He was instrumental in obtaining UNESCO assistance to the translation programs of Tamil classics. The Ayodhya canto of the Ramayana, as told by Kamban translated from Tamil by C. Rajagopalachari (Rajaji), was published in 1961 under UNESCO-sponsored programs and publications. The Interior Landscape: love poems from a classical Tamil anthology translated by A.K. Ramanujan was published in 1967 under the same program.

He encouraged the publication of research articles in Tamil. MIDS brought out, and still brings out, Tamil translations and Tamil books.

He brought out the Hindi and Tamil versions of UNESCO's journal 'Courier'.

He lent a helping hand in launching the World University Centre in Spur Tank Road in Chennai.

He desired the heritage sites to be well preserved. So he arranged for UNESCO funding for the renovation of Sri Rangam Ranganatha, Madurai Meenakshi, Thanjavur Brahadeeswara, and seven other temples. He initiated a pioneering research work by a French scholar tracing the history and traditions of the Sri Rangam temple in Tamil Nadu.

He lent a helping hand in obtaining assistance from UNESCO and the French government for organizing the Third World Tamil Conference in Paris in 1969. As Acting Director-General of UNESCO, he inaugurated it, delivering his address in three languages, Tamil, English, and French.

The speed with which he acted could be gauged from the fact that the General Conference of UNESCO at its session in November 1968 accepted the recommendation of the Second International Conference on Tamil Studies held at Madras on 3–10, January 1968 and authorized the Director-General of UNESCO to assist in the creation of an International Institute of Tamil Studies at Madras. In 1970, his last year at UNESCO, he was satisfied with witnessing the setting up of the Institute at Madras, Tamil Nadu.

Though it was personally inconvenient for him because he had lost touch with the language during his long vacation in Europe, he still would write articles in Tamil whenever requested to do so. At a function to commemorate his 83rd birthday on 18 April 1992, when the new office premises of the Tamil Nadu Board of Continuing Education was named after him, he gave a stirring speech in chaste Tamil, which was well appreciated.

He strove hard to reply in Tamil all letters addressed to him in Tamil.

== Other activities ==
Adiseshiah was President of the Indian Economic Association in 1973-74 and presided over the Waltair session of its Annual Conference in 1974. Subsequently, as a past President, he evinced keen interest in putting the association's finances in sound order. He took steps to advance its publishing record.

He was also a member of the Royal Economic Society.

He was a member of the Governing Body of Centre for Development Studies (CDS) since 1980 and was its chairman for six years, 1986–92. Under his chairmanship, the Centre entered into an agreement with the United Nations Fund for Population Activities and the Government of India for conducting an international training program in population and development.

Adisehsiah succeeded Prof. Lakdawala as Chairman of the Institute of Social Sciences (ISS) and last presided over the Governing Body meeting on 11 November 1994. It was in the inaugural address to the seminar on Panchayati Raj in Karnataka in October 1985 at ISS that Adiseshiah made the following often-quoted comment:

Tamil Nadu, for instance, has had no panchayat elections for the last 15 years since 1971. In these fifteen years, the Tamil Nadu Government has put forward 20 reasons for the postponement of local elections. It announced election 20 times and postponed it as many times. The reasons given were: drought, flood, cyclone, villagers being busy with agricultural operations, revision of electoral rolls, delay in printing electoral rolls, lowering the age limit, reservations, court stay on reservations, appeals against those reservations in the Supreme Court, school examinations, student unrest, by-elections, mid-term elections, general elections, delimitation of wards, issue of identity cards to voters and Census operations. In addition to these 18 reasons, we have now had four postponements.

== Death ==
His life came to a quick end. He was hospitalized for less than a week with kidney and heart ailments. He was conscious till the last day. He died on 21 November 1994, aged 84 years.

Elizabeth Adiseshiah died in 1986, leaving all her property to her husband. In Adiseshiah's will, he had bequeathed his valuable residential property to MIDS, and his remaining wealth for setting up Malcolm and Elizabeth Adiseshiah (M&EA) Trust for conducting programmes in the broad area of economics – teaching and research, both fundamental and applied.

In 1993 and 1994, UNESCO PROSPECTS: Quarterly review of comparative education published a series of profiles of 100 famous educators from around the world. In the company of intellectuals like Aristotle, Confucius, Freud, Gramsci, Locke, Plato, and Rousseau, the list includes seven Indians. They are Malcolm Adiseshiah, Sri Aurobindo, Mohandas Karamchand Gandhi, Jiddu Krishnamurti, J.P. Naik, Rabindranath Tagore, and Vivekananda. These articles have subsequently been collected and published under the title "Thinkers on Education" in three volumes, edited by Tedesco, Juan Carlos and Morsy, Zaghloul, [Paris, UNESCO; New Delhi, Oxford & IBH Publishing, 1997].

== In his honour ==
Adiseshiah is remembered for significant awards, prizes, scholarships, and endowed chairs. The annual Malcolm Adiseshiah International Literacy Prize (value US$15,000) was awarded by UNESCO in 1998. The prize rewards organizations or individuals who displayed outstanding merit and achieved with particularly effective results in contributing to the fight for literacy among the member countries of UNESCO.

The National Council of Applied Economic Research (NCAER]), New Delhi, in partnership with the Indian International Centre, New Delhi, and support of the Malcolm and Elizabeth Adiseshiah Trust, has organized the Malcolm Adiseshiah Mid-Year Review of the Indian Economy since 2011.NCAER prepares the annual review, and the proceedings are jointly published.

A Founder's Day Lecture by a distinguished social scientist is arranged annually in MIDS, Chennai. To commemorate Professor Adiseshiah's cosmopolitanism, a Visiting Professorial Chair has been instituted there whereby a scholar of distinction is invited to that position. The Malcolm and Elizabeth Adiseshiah Ph.D. Merit Scholarship is created to provide training and facilities for talented researchers to pursue high-quality academic research dedicated to development issues in Tamil Nadu.

The Malcolm Adiseshiah Award carries a cash grant of 200,000 rupees and a citation. It is given every year to a mid-career scholar who has made outstanding contributions to the field of Development Studies. It is instituted by M&EA Trust and presented in a special ceremony in Chennai.

Malcolm S. Adiseshiah, Chair of Development Economics and Decentralised Planning, is instituted by M&EA Trust in the Institute for Social Sciences, New Delhi.

The Emerald Jubilee Malcolm S. Adiseshiah Award, consisting of a gold medallion, a certificate and a shield, is given by the State Resource Centre, Chennai, every year to a district Collector who had made a significant contribution to the rehabilitation of child labor and for imparting vocational education to improve their lot. Adiseshiah was the first president of the center (an autonomous body under the Union Ministry of Human Resource) at its inception in 1973 and held the post for a decade. Dr. Malcolm Adiseshiah Award by the Tamil Nadu Board of Continuing Education and State Resource Centre for Non-Formal Education is given to a person recognizing his contribution to Adult Education at a function in commemoration of World Science Day. Dr. Malcolm Adiseshiah Award of Honour is also provided by them for outstanding community service.

Voorhees College, Vellore has instituted annual awards of Dr. Malcolm S. Adiseshiah Prize for Proficiency in History to the best III year student of the B.A.(History) Class; Dr. Malcolm S. Adiseshiah Prize for Proficiency in Chemistry to the best III Year Student of the B.Sc., (Chemistry) Class and The Adiseshiah Memorial Gold Medal for Proficiency in English to the best student of the III Year B.A./B.Sc., class. It is unclear whether the last-mentioned prize is awarded in his honor or in honor of his father, who was principal of that college. IIT Delhi Academician Reetika Khera, Avijit Pathak from the Centre for the Study of Social Systems, JNU, Research Scholar V. Kalyan Shankar and Kannan Vishwanatth received the Malcolm Adiseshiah award.
