= Kadaria Ahmed =

Nigerian journalist (born 1967)

- Born: Kadaria Ahmed; December 13, 1967 (age 58); Kano
- Education: Bayero University Kano, Goldsmiths, University of London
- Occupations: Journalist, entrepreneur, editor and the CEO of RadioNow 95.3FM
- Partner: Yemi Adesida
- Parent: Hafsat Abdulwaheed (mother)
- Website: www.daria.media

Kadaria Ahmed is a Nigerian journalist, media entrepreneur, television host and the chief executive officer of RadioNow 95.3FM. She started her career at the BBC in London and has worked in print, radio, television, online and social media platforms.

== Life and career ==
Ahmed has an MA in Television from Goldsmiths, University of London, and a Bachelor's from Bayero University Kano. She is also a Chevening Scholar.

She started her career at the BBC where she was a senior producer working on award-winning programs, Focus on Africa and Network Africa. In that capacity, she helped shape the news agenda for those leading programs and reported from many parts of the world including South Africa, Eritrea and the United Nations.

Back in Nigeria, Ahmed served as the editor of Next, an award-winning publication. There, she supervised a newsroom of approximately 120 people and about 30 stringers and drove the editorial agenda for the organisation. The newspaper stopped publishing its print edition in September 2011.

In 2011, she moderated Nigeria's presidential election debate live on the national television.

In 2014, she co-created, produced and presented Straight Talk, an interview programme designed to probe and confront Nigeria's decision makers on matters of relevance. Some of her notable interview subjects include Ibrahim Babangida, Tonye Princewill, Babatunde Fashola, Rotimi Amaechi, Ali Baba, Oby Ezekwesili, among many others.

In 2017, she launched a new show called The Core on Channels TV. In July 2017, she interviewed Nnamdi Kanu, leader of the Indigenous People of Biafra (IPOB) who made news by declaring it's "Biafra or death".

In the build up to the February 2019 general elections, she moderated the town hall meetings for presidential candidates and their deputies, specifically that of President Muhammadu Buhari and his vice, Professor Yemi Osibanjo.

Ahmed is currently a member of the judging panel of the Wole Soyinka Centre for Investigative Journalism and sits on the Board of Trustees of Premium Times Centre for Investigative Journalism and the Promasidor Quill awards. She is also a member of the Nigerian Guild of Editors and the Nigerian Institute of Directors.

In 2017, she founded Daria Media Ltd, a company designed to promote public service journalism In 2020, she founded RadioNow 95.3FM. She is a member of board of trustees of Premium Times Centre for Investigative Journalism

== Controversies ==
In early 2021, it was reported by an online medium that Kaduna State government favored her by allocating land to her, allegation she denied, and stated that she went through the legal processes of applying for land in Kaduna but could not perfect the processes that would entitle her to the land, which she said she ultimately lost.

In February 2021 she accused Nigerian journalists of fanning the flames of ethnic hate by their coverage of crisis involving Fulani ethnic group which the chairman of Nigerian Union of Journalist, Abuja chapter, Emmanuel Ogbeche described in response, as false.

In 2019 she was accused of "open bias" in her handling of the presidential election debate between Muhammadu Buhari and Atiku Abubakar but she said her method drew from the way each candidate treated her during the election.

== Writing and editing ==
Ahmed's journalistic articles have been published in national and international newspapers like the Daily Trust, The Guardian, and the Financial Times of London.

She has also edited two major publications. The first, titled, Nigeria the Good News, published in 2012, is a compendium of articles from entrepreneurs, civil society activists, captains of industry and policymakers on the positive things that were taking place in Nigeria despite the difficulties the country was facing.

In 2014, the Henrich Boell Foundation commissioned her to work on a publication on sustainable development and the impact of climate change in Lagos State. Titled, ‘Lagos – A Climate Resilient Megacity’ the publication is a collection of articles by experts working in various fields on the impact of climate change on Lagos and the type of interventions needed to address existing problems and mitigate future ones.
