= Patrick Geoffrey O'Neill =

British academic (1924–2012)

P. G. O'Neill (1924 – 19 January 2012) was a British academic and writer on Japanese language and Noh drama.

O'Neill was, with Ronald P. Dore, Sir Peter Parker and John R. McEwan, one of the "Dulwich boys", 30 sixth-formers who commenced study of Japanese at the School of Oriental and African Studies in May 1942.

O'Neill was Professor of Japanese at SOAS from 1968 until 1986.

== Works ==
on Noh

- Collected Writings ISBN 4-931444-37-7
- A Guide to No
- Early No Drama
- Japan on Stage

on Japanese language

- A Reader of Handwritten Japanese
- Japanese Kana Handbook
- A programmed course on respect language in modem Japanese. London: English Universities Press, 1966.
- Essential Kanji. (a sequenced introduction to the Tōyō kanji 1946–1981)
- 日英佛教語辞典 A Dictionary of Japanese Buddhist Terms, Based on References in Japanese Literature (with INAGAKI, Hisao 稲垣久雄, Kyoto 1984).
- 中日英佛教語辞典 Chinese-Japanese-English-French Teaching Terms Lexicon. (enlarged edition of above)
- 日本人名辞典 - dictionary of variant pronunciations of Japanese personal names and surnames.
- 日本人名地名辞典 - personal names, surnames and place names dictionary
