= Littattafan soyayya =

Subgenre of Hausa literature

Littattafan soyayya (lit. 'love literature'), also known as Kano market literature (Hausa: Adabin Kasuwar Kano), is a genre of Hausa literature that emerged during the late 1980s in northern Nigeria and Niger. Primarily, though not exclusively, written by women, and generally published in the form of small pamphlets and sold in markets, littattafan soyayya novels are often romantic or familial dramas that focus on the inner lives of Hausa women. While the genre was derogatorily described as "pulp fiction" during the 1990s and subjected to censorship and book burnings during the 2000s, since the 2010s littattafan soyayya has been subjected to renewed critical and academic interest as a modern form of Hausa literature and praised for its focus on social issues affecting Hausa women.

== Etymology ==
The Hausa term littattafan soyayya can be literally be translated as "love literature" or "literature of love". The term has been used to an extent interchangeably with Kano market literature, a reference to its popularity among booksellers in marketplaces in Kano, Nigeria, as well as elsewhere in the Hausa-speaking Sahel region.

== History ==
There is no consensus among when littattafan soyayya emerged as a subgenre of Hausa literature in its own right, though the publication of the novels Young at Heart (1987) and Sin is a Puppy That Follows You Home (1990) by Balaraba Ramat Yakubu are widely considered to be among its first published works; with Yakubu being described as a "pioneer" of the form, and the publication of the latter novel being called the "birth" of littattafan soyayya as a genre. Some academics, such as Abdalla Uba Adamu and Umma Aliyu Musa have dated the publication of the first littattafan soyayya novel as 1980, though both acknowledge that the genre did not gain more widespread popularity until the end of the decade. The 1970 novel So Aljannar Duniya by Hafsat Abdulwaheed, while not considered to be littattafan soyayya, has been described as the genre's "precursor", with it being retrospectively described as having "really set the world alight to [Hausa] love-story writing".

During the 1990s, some littattafan soyayya writers became well-known writers within the Hausa-speaking world, including Bilkisu Funtuwa, whose novels included Allura cikin ruwa (1994), Wa ya san gobe? (1996) and Ki yarda di ni (1997). Despite their popularity, the genre became criticised by some elements of Hausa society for mentioning taboo topics including premarital sex and "love outside arranged marriages". In 2001, a censorship board was established in Nigeria to "ensure" the books did not violate social taboos. In 2007, Ibrahim Shekarau, the governor of Kano State, held a public book burning of littattafan soyayya novels at a girls' school in Kano, describing them as "pornographic"; the Kano State Hisbah Corps, a religious police force, subsequently began monitoring the publication of books considered to be littattafan soyayya.

Following the book burning, a coalition of writers groups in Kano State took legal action against censorship boards; they were successful, with the boards being closed down, and by the 2010s the formal and informal censorship of littattafan soyayya novels in Nigeria was reported to have reduced. During that decade, some writers were able to make a living publishing their work, earning on average between 600 and 1200 USD per novel. Some writers were also invited to speak at universities about the genre. In 2012, Yakubu's 1990 novel Sin is a Puppy That Follows You Home became the first Hausa-language book by a woman to be translated into English.

In 2016, BBC Hausa established its Short Story Writing Contest for Women, which aimed at highlighting and promoting works of littattafan soyayya written by women.

== Description ==
Littattafan soyayya novels are traditionally pamphlets self-published in Kano and sold in markets across the Sahel region. They tend to be romantic or family dramas, uncommon in traditional Hausa literature. They were written primarily by Muslim women and can include issues facing Hausa women, including polygamy, adultery, child marriage, sex trafficking, slavery, forced marriage, purdah and divorce. Writers tend to live in northern Nigeria and hand-write their stories before sending the notebooks to Kano to be typed, mimeographed, printed and published. Some stories are, at least in part, biographical; Yakubu's novel Sin is a Puppy That Follows You Home details her experiences as a child bride. Other novels can be "morality tales" about women experiencing love and marriage, and the issues and difficulties facing couples.

The books are often published with colourful covers featuring Bollywood and Kannywood actors, due to the genres' popularity among Hausa people; in the case of Bollywood actors, they are often edited to be wearing traditional Hausa clothing, with characters often being chosen due to coming from films with similar themes or plots to the novel. Littattafan soyayya novels are primarily pamphlets of between 18 and 20 pages, which are sold for around 300 NGN (around 1 USD).

While littattafan soyayya generally have not been made available online, this has changed with the increase of internet access among regions with Hausa readers; some novels have been published on internet forums, sometimes in instalments or chapters. Additionally, their popularity has led to them being broadcast on the radio; Express FM, a Kano-based radio station, broadcasts littattafan soyayyya stories five days a week.

Littattafan soyayya's primarily readership is Hausa-speaking women, though since the 2010s the novels have been translated into other languages. Books can sell anywhere between 1000 and 20, 0000 copies; the novel In da so da kauna by Ado Ahmad Gidan Dabino is reported to have sold over 200, 000 copies. Some novels have been adapted into Kannywood films, including three by Fauziyyah D. Suleiman.

== Reception and analysis ==
The Hausa scholar Carmen McCain has attributed littattafan soyayya's popularity due to its novels presenting the perspectives of ordinary Hausa people living in contemporary society. Abdalla Uba Adamu has further cited the genre's accessibility, including being written in colloquial Hausa and published in an accessible and affordable format, as further spreading its reach across locations with Hausa populations, including in Nigeria and Niger, as well as among diaspora communities in Saudi Arabia and Malaysia. The novels' focus on social issues impacting Hausa women have led to them being described by Novian Whitsitt as the "vehicles" of the writers' views and concerns. Littattafan soyayya's popularity compared to other subgenres of Hausa literature has led to it being described as a "revival" of Hausa writing. Yaa Nkrumah has noted the genre's basis among writers' Muslim faith, describing littattafan soyayya novels as a "form of figurative Quranic interpretation", exploring Islamic ethical concepts like hakki (rights), haƙuri (patience) and qaddara (divine decree), with both the characters and the writers negotiating "religious and ethical authority". Murtala Abdullahi had cited the genre's popularity as leading to "significant change" in the way women are treated in Hausa society.

While the genre has been critically reassessed since the 2010s, its initial reception was largely negatively; littattafan soyayya was criticised by some academics and politicians for being "influenced by foreign cultures" and accused of having a "negative impact on Nigerian youths", including fears that novels about topics such as "love outside marriage" could lead to increases in premarital sex. Among literarary scholars, littattafan soyayya was dismissed as "cheap pulp fiction" about "girlish romances"; in 2000, Ibrahim Malumfashi stated publicly that the books should not be considered "literature" but rather as gwanjo ("unserious pamphlets").

While littattafan soyayya remains extremely popular among Hausa readers, McCain notes that the books are eclipsed both within Nigeria and internationally by Nigerian writers writing in English, including Chimamanda Ngozi Adichie, Chika Unigwe and Elnathan John.

== Recognition ==
In 2016, the American photographer Glenna Gordon published a series of photographs of littattafan soyayya writers living in Kano between 2013 and 2015, in the photobook Diagram of the Heart. The book was named the New York Times' Photobook of the Year, and photos from it were featured at the Museum of Contemporary African Diasporan Arts' Moving Walls: 23 Journeys exhibition.

In 2018, Farida Ado, a littattafan soyayya writer who had been called "Kano's Jane Austen", was named on TIME's 2018 Next Generation Leaders list.
