= Castle Rushen High School =

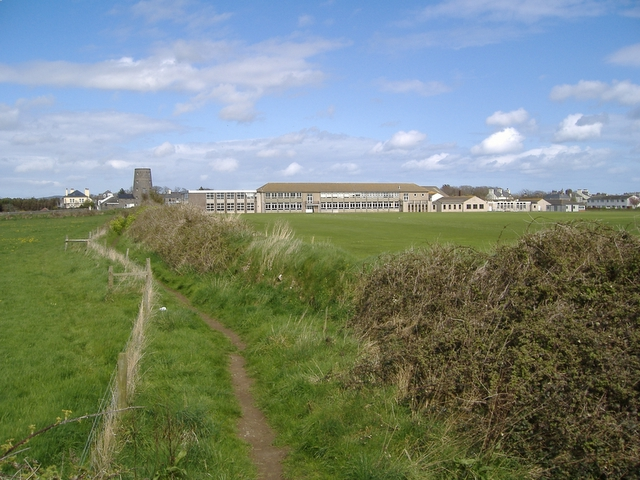
- View of the school

Location
- Arbory Road; Castletown, IM9 1RE; Isle of Man; 54.0744°N 4.6617°W

Information
- Motto: Lhiat Myr Toilliu
- Head teacher: Keith Winstanley
- Gender: Co-educational
- Age: 11 to 19
- Enrolment: c. 850
- Houses: Bradda; Carrick; Scarlett; Langness
- Colours: Navy; Light Blue
- Website: crhs.sch.im

Castle Rushen High School is a co-educational secondary state school located in Castletown on the Isle of Man for pupils from the south of the island.

== Isle of Man school system ==
The Isle of Man has five secondary schools. The other comprehensive schools are St Ninian's High School, Ballakermeen High School, Ramsey Grammar School and Queen Elizabeth II High School. There is one private (fee-paying) school, King William's College.

== The House System ==
The pupils of the school are grouped into four houses named after headlands or rocks in the south of the island: Bradda, Carrick, Langness and Scarlett. Houses compete in a number of events in the year ranging from sporting events such as inter-house rugby, cross country and netball to more academic competition in the form of a merit award system for good work. There are four trophies available each year for "Sport", "Merits", and "Attendance", and the overall best house trophy which is awarded to the house which does best over the other three categories.

== Notable alumni ==
- James Anthony Brown – former Chief Minister of the Isle of Man
- John Corrin – politician
- Noel Cringle – politician
- Margaret Curphey – soprano
- Phil Gawne – politician
- Sarah Kerruish – documentary filmmaker
- Davy Knowles – blues guitarist
- Angela Little – university professor
- Edmund Lowey – politician
- David Mullarkey – long-distance runner
- Becky Storrie – professional road cyclist
- Sir Miles Walker – first Chief Minister of the Isle of Man
- Juan Watterson – Speaker of the House of Keys
