= Glenna Gordon =

American documentary photographer, photojournalist, editor, and educator

- Born: May 3, 1981 (age 45); Brooklyn, New York
- Education: Columbia University School of Journalism
- Occupation: Photographer
- Website: glennagordon.com

Glenna Gordon (born 3 May 1981) is an American documentary photographer, photojournalist, editor, and educator based in New York City. She is known for documenting such event as the Ebola outbreak, ISIS and Al Qaeda's hostage situations, and the kidnapping of more than two hundred and fifty Nigerian school girls. She is also known for her documentation of Nigerian weddings. Her work has been commissioned by The New York Times Magazine, Time, The Wall Street Journal, and Smithsonian. Gordon is an adjunct professor at the New School in New York City and an editor at Red Hook Editions.

== Biography ==
In 2006, Gordon earned a master's degree in print journalism from the Columbia University School of Journalism. She then made her first trip to Africa where she photographed images of the developing world. Her work has been shown in museums in New York City, Washington D.C., Nigeria, and London. She lectures at the New School in New York City in the graduate program for international affairs.

== Works ==
=== ISIS and Al Qaeda hostages ===
In 2014, Gordon was commissioned by The New York Times to take photographs for an article on ISIS hostages by Rukmini Callimachi. The article "The Horror Before the Beheadings" focused on the experiences of people held hostage by ISIS. The photographs were also featured in Callimachi's articles "Paying Ransoms, Europe Bankrolls Qaeda Terror". In this series, Gordon photographed objects the freed hostages held onto during and after their captivity. The objects reveal pieces of individual hostage's stories unknown to the public.

=== Mass abduction in Nigeria ===
In 2014, the jihadist terrorist organization, Boko Haram kidnapped 276 girls from their boarding school in Chibok in northeast Nigeria. Although there was media coverage about the incident, little mentioned the kidnapped girls themselves. Gordon photographed some of their belongings sent to her by family members. The photographs were published in The New York Times, The Wall Street Journal, and Time. The work was given the 2015 World Press Award.

=== Diagram of the Heart ===
Gordon's Diagram of the Heart captures female novelists living in Kano, a city in Northern Nigeria. The novelists write in the genre of Littattafan Soyayya, which roughly translates to love literature. Published in 2016 Diagram of the Heart was awarded photo book of the year by The New York Times Magazine, Pictures of the Year International and PDN (Photo District News). The book was also featured in Moving Walls 23: Journeys and the Museum of Contemporary African Diasporan Arts.

=== American Women of the Far Right ===
American Women of the Far Right is an investigative photo essay wherein Gordon explores the views of women who participate in extremist politics and hate groups. She had found that white supremacy was largely portrayed in the media through a male dominated lens. Gordon captured portraits of women who also hold these politic views. Some of these women identified as white supremacists, conservative extremists, racists, Klansmen, and Nazis.

=== American Women ===
In 2019, Gordon won the Aftermath Grant for her proposed project American Women. This project is an expansion of American Women of the Far Right. The project will cover women who live in the same areas but who instead work for social justice.

=== Liberia: Traces of America's Ghosts ===
Liberia: Traces of America's Ghosts is an ongoing project to documenting the after effects of Liberia's civil war. Gordon has been working in Liberia as a photojournalist since 2009.

=== Nigeria Ever After ===
Published in 2012, Nigeria Ever After is a collection of photographs from Nigerian weddings. The collection explores the style and cost of marriage in the country.

=== Indonesia: The End is the Beginning ===
Gordon's photographic series Indonesia: The End is the Beginning depicts the different kinds of funeral rites and burial practices in Indonesia. Gordon captures the celebration of death and transition to the afterlife on the island of Bali. Another photo follows a long funeral procession and slow mourning process on the island of Sumba.

== Achievements ==
=== Grants ===
- 2019: Aftermath project grant
- 2017–2018: The New School, Faculty Research Fund
- 2017: Economic Hardship Reporting Project
- 2017: Pulitzer Center Grant, Nigeria
- 2016: Indonesia, Festival PhotoReporter Grant
- 2012: Nigeria, African Artists Foundation Residency

=== Awards ===
- 2019: American Women
- 2017: Eugene Smith Award
- 2017: PDN winner for personal project
- 2015: Magenta Foundation Flash Forward Award
- 2015: World Press Award
- 2015: American Photo
- 2015: Communication Arts
- 2014: Grand Prize for visual storytelling, LensCulture
- 2014: First prize in portraiture, Px3
