= Margaret Curphey =

British soprano (1938–2024)

- Curphey, in the 1980s
- Born: Susan Margaret Curphey; 27 February 1938; Douglas, Isle of Man, UK
- Died: 13 March 2024 (aged 86); Isle of Man, UK
- Occupation: Operatic soprano
- Organizations: Sadler's Wells Opera (ENO); Opera North

Susan Margaret Curphey (27 February 1938 – 13 March 2024) was a British soprano best known for her performances in the operas of Richard Wagner. While she was known for the Wagner repertoire, critic Max Loppert stated Curphey's "flexible lyric soprano enabled her to play a wide range of parts" which were "all sung with taste and distinction and acted with reserve."

== Early life ==
The eldest of four daughters born to William Curphey and his wife Mary Curphey (nee Gelling), Susan Margaret Curphey was born on 27 February 1938 in Douglas, Isle of Man. Her father was a police sergeant who rose to the role of inspector of the Harbour Police. Both of her parents and her twin sisters, Muriel and Christine, were talented amateur singers. Margaret sang with her mother in several music competitions held at local festivals in her growing up years. In her early life she studied singing with Douglas Buxton. She was educated at Castle Rushen High School where she performed in school theatricals. She worked as a tailor before becoming a singer. In 1960 she won the gold medal at the Manx Music Festival singing competition.

== Vocal training and early career ==
Curphey's path was reoriented towards a singing career when she won the Rose Bowl singing prize at the 1960 Blackpool Music Festival which led to an invitation to study at the Birmingham School of Music (BSM) by BSM's principal Gordon Clinton. She studied at BSM with voice teacher and baritone John Carol Case. She later pursued further studies in singing with tenor David Galliver and soprano Joan Cross in London. She made her professional debut in 1963 as a member of the Arts Council of Great Britain’s Opera for All programme; an organisation with which she toured in 1963–1964. With this company she portrayed Carolina in Cimarosa's The Secret Marriage with tenor Dennis Brandt as Paolino, Norina in Donizetti's Don Pasquale with Brandt as Ernesto, and alternated in the roles of Mimì and Musetta in Puccini's La bohème with Brandt as Rodolfo.

In August 1963 Curphey recorded the role of Norina for a BBC studio broadcast. She sang Norina at Skipton Town Hall and the New Theatre Royal Lincoln in February 1964. In the summer of 1964 she became a member of the chorus at the Glyndebourne Festival Opera (GFO) where she also worked as an understudy for Montserrat Caballé. In 1965 she sang there the role of the Lady-in-Waiting in Verdi's Macbeth with Linda Vajna as Lady Macbeth and Kostas Paskalis in the title role.

== Sadler's Wells and English National Opera ==
In 1965 Curphey became a member of the Sadler's Wells Opera (SWO) with whom she first appeared as Micaela in Bizet's Carmen with Joyce Blackham in the title role. She remained as resident artist with SWO for thirteen seasons; staying with the company when it moved from the Sadler's Wells Theatre to the London Coliseum (LC) in 1968, and when it transformed into the English National Opera (ENO) in 1974. In 1969 she portrayed Eva in Wagner's Die Meistersinger von Nürnberg in the premiere of a new English translation by Reginald Goodall; having previously sung that role in an earlier SWO production given in August 1968 for the company's first performance at the LC. Between 1970 and 1973 she appeared in all four parts of the Ring cycle with the SWO in English translations by Andrew Porter; productions which resulted in recordings and a tour of the British provinces.

In 1975 Curphey portrayed Sieglinde in Die Walküre at the ENO in a performance Max Loppert described as possessing "rich vocal amplitude and real pathos". Just a few months later she performed as Brünnhilde in that same opera at the ENO, and went on to perform Brünnhilde in the complete Ring cycle in the autumn of 1977. Other roles she performed with either SWO or ENO included Countess Almaviva in The Marriage of Figaro, Elisabeth de Valois in Verdi's Don Carlos, Ellen Orford in Britten's Peter Grimes, Elsa in Wagner's Lohengrin, Gutrune in Götterdämmerung, Leonora in Verdi's Il trovatore, Marguerite in La Damnation de Faust by Berlioz, both Mimì and Musetta in La bohème, Ninetta in Rossini's The Thieving Magpie, Pamina in Mozart's The Magic Flute, Santuzza in Mascagni's Cavalleria rusticana, Violetta in Verdi's La traviata, and the title roles in Weber's Euryanthe and Donizetti's Maria Stuarda.

== Other performances ==
In 1967 Curphey married baritone and businessman Philip Summerscales. That same year she performed in the British premiere of Mozart's Lucio Silla at the Camden Theatre in London, and gave her first performances at the Scottish Opera as Mozart's Pamina, Verdi's Violetta, and Euridice in Gluck's Orfeo ed Euridice. In 1970 she won the bronze medal at the International Young Opera Singers competition in Sofia, Bulgaria, which earned her a contract with the National Opera and Ballet of Bulgaria. In 1978 she sang Brünnhilde in Die Walküre at the Municipal Theatre of Santiago and in the complete Ring at the Seattle Opera.

Illness led Curphey to put her career on hiatus from 1978 to 1980. She had long battled chronic problems with her hip stemming from a bad playground accident when she was 12 years old. This injury resulted in a need for hip surgery at the time of her career break. She had been scheduled to sing Isolde in Tristan und Isolde at the Welsh National Opera in 1979, but was replaced by Anna Green. She returned to the stage with Opera North; portraying Reiza in Weber's Oberon (1981), Yaroslavna in Borodin's Prince Igor (1982), and Agathe in Weber's Der Freischütz (1983). In 1981 she appeared at the Grand Théâtre de Genève as Miss Jessel in Britten's The Turn of the Screw.

Curphey appeared in Wagner operas as a guest artist at various European opera houses during the 1980s, but her career remained hampered by mobility issues related to her hip and she never made a return to full time performance. She was also active as a concert soprano during her career; including making several appearances as a guest soloist with the Hallé Choir and conductor Maurice Handford, and the Royal Choral Society and conductor Meredith Davies.

== Retirement and later life ==
Curphey retired from performance in 1994; giving her last performance that year at the Erin Arts Centre on the Isle of Man with her husband and tenor Alberto Remedios. She returned to living on the Isle of Man, and was an important musical figure among the Manx people. She had one daughter with her husband, Helen.

Margaret Curphey died of heart failure on 13 March 2024 at the age of 86.
