= Hafsat Abdulwaheed =

Nigerian writer and poet

Hafsat Abdulwaheed Ahmad
- Born: Hafsat Abdulwaheed; May 5, 1952 (age 74); Kano, Nigeria
- Education: Shahuci Primary School; Provincial Girls School
- Occupation: Author
- Children: Kadaria Ahmed, Zainab Ahmed
- Writing career
- Language: Hausa

Hafsat Abdulwaheed Ahmed (born May 5, 1952) is a Nigerian writer, poet, and a women's rights activist. She is the first female Hausa writer from Northern Nigeria to have written a published novel. Hafsat hails from Kofar Mata quarters of Kano City of Kano State Nigeria.

== Early life ==
Hafsat Abdulwaheed was born on May 5, 1952. She is a Nigerian author who writes mainly in Hausa. She is a poet, and a women's rights activist. She hails from Kofar Mata quarters of Kano City, Northern Nigeria. She did her primary education at Shahuci primary School and secondary school at Provincial Girls School currently known as Shekara Girls Secondary School, both in Kano State. She started writing in her primary school days. She married Muhammed Ahmed Abdulwaheed on January 25, 1966 In the early 1970s she became the first female Hausa writer to have her novel published. In the 2000s, she attempted to contest in the governorship election in the Northern Nigerian State of Zamfara. She has written more than 30 books, only five of which have been published. She has a number of children and the eldest among them is Kadaria Amed, a journalist

== Writing career ==
Hafsat Abdulwaheed started writing when she was in primary school, where she wrote folktales and she received awards. She once received an award from the British Council when she was either in primary four or five. In 1970 she entered one of her stories, So Aljannar Duniya ("Love is Paradise on Earth"), which she wrote when she was in primary five, in a literary competition organized by the Northern Nigerian Publishing Company (NNPC). The book was inspired by the experiences of her elder sister who at that time married a Libyan and the cultural differences began to generate friction in the marriage. She reviewed and edited it before it was submitted.

The book, which is her best known book, came second in the competition. So Aljannar Duniya has been adjudged by analysts as the precursor to a genre of modern Hausa writing known as Littattafan Soyayya or "Love Books", or what is known as "Kano Market Literature". Cara Giaimo quotes Abdallah Uba Adamu and Graham Furniss as saying, '...it was this book that "really set the world alight to [Hausa] love-story writing...".'

Her published books in addition to So Aljannar Duniya, include Yardubu Mai Tambotsai ("'Yardubu the Possessed" - fiction), Nasiha ga Ma'aura (Admonition for the Married Couple - non-fiction), Namijin Maza Tauraron Annabawa (non-fiction on the life of Muhammad), as well as a book of poetry, her first in English, Ancient Dance.

== Politics ==
Abdulwaheed has been a member of a women's rights group in Nigeria called Baobab. When the country returned to democratic governance in 1999 after prolonged military rule, the group observed that there were no women in the cabinet of the North-Western State of Zamfara, where Hafsat has been living with her husband for many years. At one time, she said, "the leadership of the group went to visit the governor and expressed their displeasure at this development. I didn't go with them because I wasn't given to keeping quiet when I felt something wasn't right.

"When they came back, they told me that the governor had said there was no woman in Zamfara educated enough to serve in his cabinet, and I thought that was an insult, because in my house alone my daughters were very educated.

"I then said, 'Well, we are not only going to demand for the position of a commissioner, we are going to take away his seat'. And I decided that I would contest the governor's seat in the next election".

Her dream was not to be, however, because her decision was greeted with an uproar. "You know in the North it is unusual for a woman to say she wants to do anything for the public good, much less assume leadership positions", she says. Following the condemnation of her proposed candidature by Muslim scholars, the party on whose platform she wanted to contest denied her its backing and, in the end, her father prevailed on her to jettison the idea, even though she had printed posters and other campaign paraphernalia.
