= Ado Ahmad Gidan Dabino =

Hausa writer and director (b. 1964)

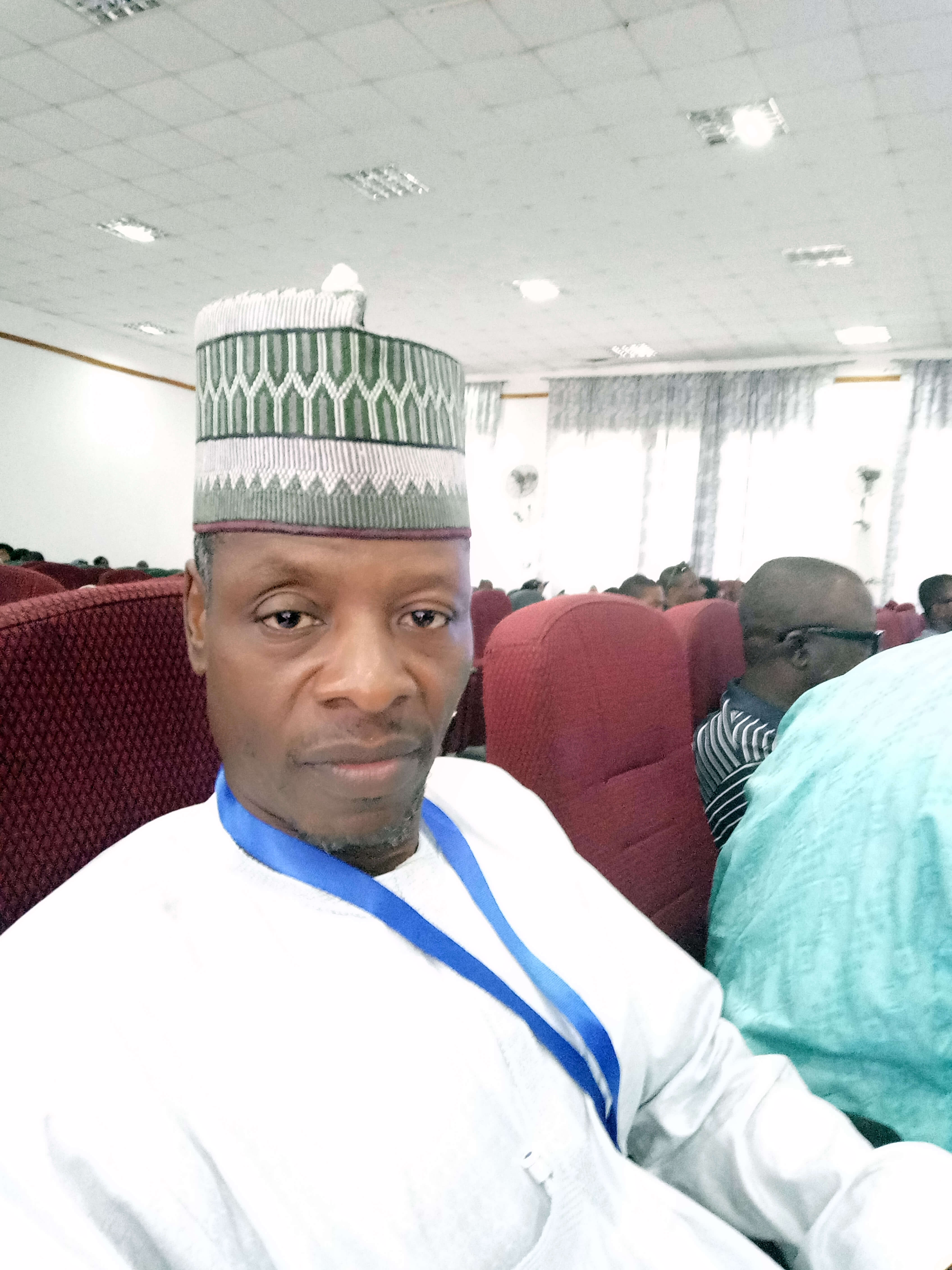
- Gidan Dabino MON
- Born: 1 January 1964 (age 62)
- Occupation: Writer; Publisher; Producer; Director
- Language: Hausa
- Notable awards: See below

Website
- gidandabino.com.ng

Ado Ahmad Gidan Dabino, MON is a Nigerian Hausa language writer, author, publisher, journalist, film producer, director and actor. He wrote for about three decades on various topics and has published fifteen novels. He was awarded with the Member of the Order of the Niger (MON) honor on 29 September 2014 by President Goodluck Ebele Jonathan.

== Early life and education ==
Gidan Dabino was born in 1964 at Danbagina of Dawakin Kudu local government area of Kano State. He started his informal education from his father and then went to Zangon Barebari where he learnt the Quran. He obtained a professional diploma in Mass Communication from Bayero University Kano.

== Career ==
Gidan Dabino is the CEO of Gidan Dabino International Nigeria Ltd, a multimedia and marketing consultancy firm based in the ancient in Kano since 1990. He was assistant editor/distribution manager of Zamani a Hausa Magazine in 1997. He was also editor and publisher of Mumtaz magazine in 2000. In 2004 he was Editor-in-Chief of Hantsi Magazine under the Kano Chief Bureau Community; the newspaper that aimed at promoting reading and writing in indigenous language. From 2012 to date he is Contributing Editor of Muryar Arewa, a monthly Magazine of the Northern Communication and Media Service LTD.

== Selected published novels ==
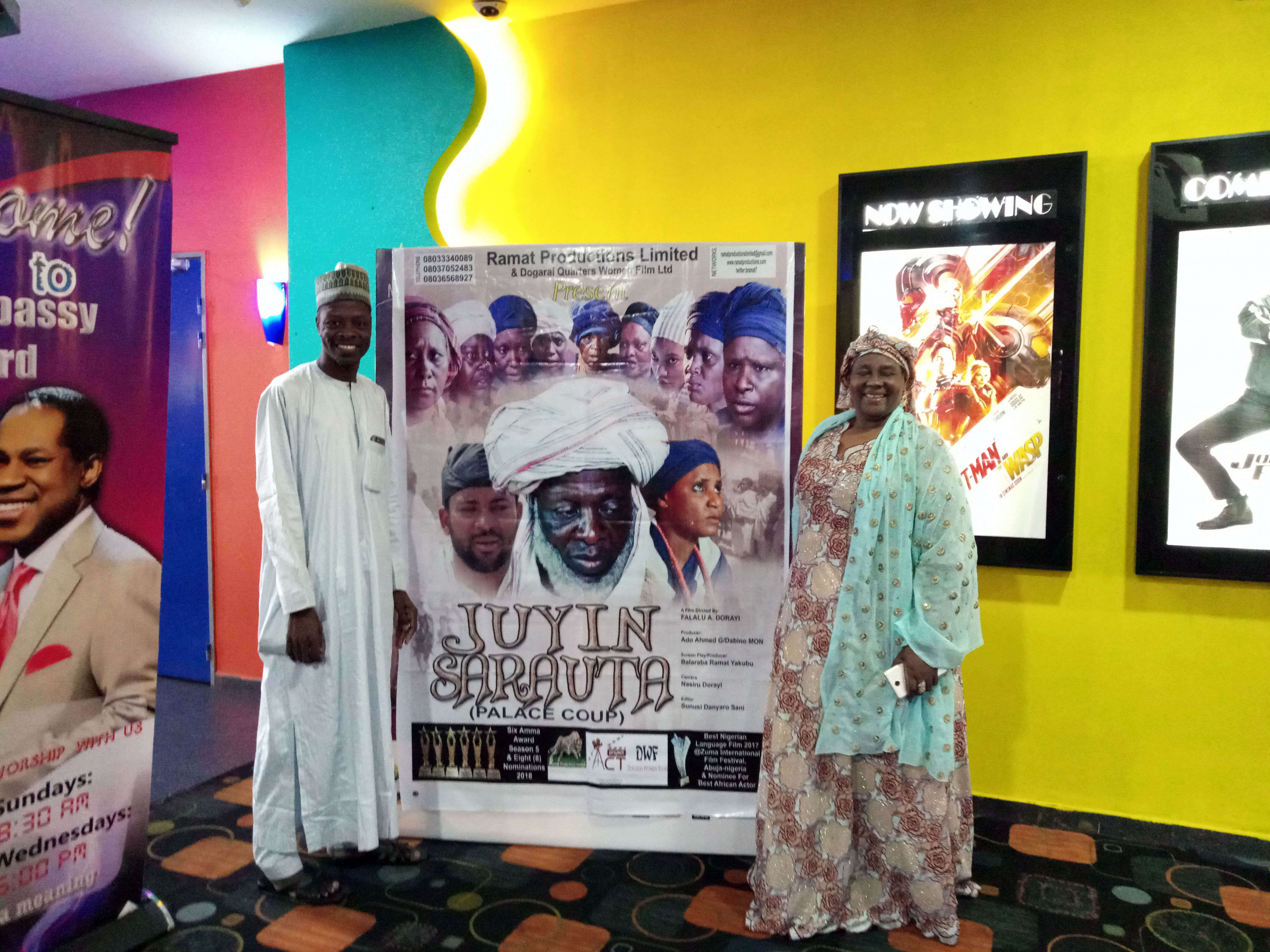
Ado Ahmad Gidan with Balaraba Ramat Yakubu during Premier of Juyin Sarauta at Abuja

- In Da So Da Kauna 1&2, Published by Gidan Dabino Publishers Enterprises, Kano. 1991. ISBN 978-309283-9 and ISBN 978214900-4
- Hattara Dai Masoya 1 & 2, Published by Gidan Dabino Publishers ISBN 978-309285-5
- Masoyan Zamani 1& 2, Published by Gidan Dabino Publishers Enterprises, Kano. 1993 ISBN 978-214901-2 and ISBN 978-214902-0
- The Soul of My Heart (Translation of in Da so Da Kauna), Published by Gidan Dabino Publishers Enterprises, Kano. 1993 ISBN 978-214903-9
- Wani Hani Ga Allah 1 & 2, Published by Gidan Dabino Publishers Enterprises, Kano. 1994 ISBN 978-214906-3 and ISBN 978-214907-1
- Nemesis (Translation of Masoyan Zamani), Published by Gidan Dabino Publishers Enterprises, Kano. 1995 ISBN 978-214905-5
- Kaico!, Published by Gidan Dabino Publishers Enterprises, Kano. 1996 ISBN 978-214933-0
- Duniya Sai Sannu, Published by Gidan Dabino Publishers Enterprises, Kano. 1997
- Malam Zalimu, (A Hausa play and winner 1st prize prestigious award of 2009 Engineer Mohammed Bashir Karaye Prize in Hausa Literature), Published by Gidan Dabino Publishers Enterprises, Kano. 2009
- Dakika Talatin Published by Gidan Dabino Publishers Enterprises, Kano. 2015 ISBN 978-808215-7

== Film-making activities ==
Gidan Dabino is one of the pioneers credited for the establishment of the Hausa film industry in Northern Nigeria known as Kannywood. He wrote the script for multiple Hausa movies, produced and directed some. He also appeared as main character in In da So da Kauna (1995), an adapted film from his own novel of the same name. His recent film, Juyin Sarauta was the most awarded Hausa movie for the year 2017 and 2018. He appeared as Sarki Yusufa of Jadarwa. He won two awards of best actor and one nomination.

== Filmography ==
Year	Film	Role			
Year	Film	Actor	Producer	Writer	Director
1994	In Da So Da Kauna 1, 2 and 3	Yes	Yes	Yes	Yes
1998	Kowa Da Ranarsa 1 & 2		Yes	Yes	
1999	Cinnaka		Yes		
1999	An Ci Moriyar Ganga		Yes		
1999	Sandar Kiwo		Yes	Yes	
1999	Mugun Nufi		Yes		
1999	Karshen Makirci			Yes	
2000	Muktar 1 & 2 Producer	Yes			
2000	Kadaran Kadahan		Yes		
2000	Kyan Alkawari		Yes		
2000	Kana Taka		Yes		
2001	Ki Yafe Ni 1& 2				Yes
2001	Sarka		Yes		
2002	Juhaina		Yes		
2002	Asiya		Yes		
2005	Tsautsayi		Yes		
2006	Wahami		Yes		
2016	Juyin Sarauta	Yes	Yes		

== Awards ==
The following are among the awards received by Gidan Dabino:

- Best Actor in Leading Role: Amma Award Season 5, 2018
- Nominee, Best African Actor: Zuma Film Festival, 2017
- Member of the Order of the Niger (MON) in recognition of his outstanding virtues and in appreciation of his services to contributions to the country, Nigeria. 2014
- Award of Honour in recognition of efforts and outstanding contributions toward uplifting Hausa Literature. 2013
- Engineer Mohammed Bashir Karaye Prize in Hausa Literature (Play Category) 2009

== See also ==
- List of Nigerian film producers
