= Ronald P. Dore =

British sociologist

Ronald Philip Dore
- Born: 1 February 1925; Bournemouth, Dorset, England, United Kingdom
- Died: 14 November 2018 (aged 93); Grizzana Morandi, Bologna, Italy
- Children: 3

Academic background
- Education: SOAS, University of London (B.A. 1947)

Academic work
- Discipline: Sociologist
- Sub-discipline: Japanologist
- Institutions: SOAS, University of London; University of British Columbia; London School of Economics; Institute of Development Studies; Harvard University; Massachusetts Institute of Technology; Institute for Advanced Study
- Doctoral students: Keith Lewin; Jonathan Unger

Ronald Philip Dore CBE FBA (1 February 1925 – 14 November 2018) was a British sociologist specialising in Japanese economy and society and the comparative study of types of capitalism. He was an associate of the Centre for Economic Performance at the London School of Economics and was a fellow of the British Academy, the Japan Academy, and the American Academy of Arts and Sciences. The citation for his eminent scholar award from the Academy of International Business describes him as "an outstanding scholar whose deep understanding of the empirical phenomena he studied and ability to build on it to develop theoretical contributions are highly respected not only by sociologists but also by economists, anthropologists, historians, and comparative business systems scholars".

== Biography ==
=== Early life ===
Ronald Philip Dore was born in Bournemouth, Dorset, on 1 February 1925. His father worked as a cleaner, fireman, and later a driver for Southern Railway. Dore attended Poole Grammar School.

Dore began to learn Japanese in 1942 as part of an 18-month Board of Education initiative to train sixth form boys in languages critical to the war effort. He was one of thirty students who were enrolled in its Japanese language programme. Originally, he applied to study Turkish as his first preference, and Chinese as his second, only to find that he had been enrolled in the Japanese course.

Language education on the programme was provided at the School of Oriental and African Studies, but Dore and the other students resided a few miles away in Dulwich College, leading to the group of students being referred to as the "Dulwich Boys". Other notable Dulwich Boys included P. G. O'Neill, John McEwan and Sir Peter Parker. Sandy Wilson also attended at the same time as Dore, but did not complete the course.

After finishing the course, Dore injured his knee during basic training and was invalided out of his army posting. Due to a shortage of teachers, he arrived back at SOAS to teach Japanese to servicemen. Notable pupils of Dore at SOAS included Hugh Cortazzi.

Dore finished his Bachelor of Arts degree (first class) in Modern Japanese at SOAS in 1947. His first trip to Japan was in 1950, arriving in Kobe.

=== Academic career ===
Dore embarked upon his postgraduate research at SOAS in 1947. This led to publication of his first book, City Life in Japan: A Study of a Tokyo Ward, in 1958. Thereafter, he conducted research on a broad variety of topics in Japan, including education, land reform and village life. He also engaged in a number of studies comparing Japanese social organizational forms and institutions with those found in other parts of the world. This resulted from earlier comparative research on development while employed at the Institute of Development Studies at Sussex University and led to his important analyses of Japan's post-war industrial system and of different forms of stock market and welfare capitalism.

Many of Dore's publications were translated and published in Japan, where he was greatly admired. His facility in the Japanese language as a foreigner was unsurpassed, and he would frequently deliver lectures in that language with notes hardly filling a half A4 size sheet of paper.

He held academic positions at the University of British Columbia, the Institute of Development Studies at Sussex University, the Technical Change Centre in London, the Institute for Economic growth in Delhi, the London School of Economics, Imperial College London, Harvard University, and Massachusetts Institute of Technology.

While at the Institute of Development studies, Dore served as the doctoral supervisor to several notable academics, including Jonathan Unger and Keith Lewin.

=== Death ===
Dore died aged 93 in Grizzana Morandi, Bologna, Italy, on 14 November 2018. He was the last surviving Dulwich Boy.

== Publications ==
- City Life in Japan: A Study of a Tokyo Ward. 1958.
- British Factory, Japanese Factory. 1973.
- Dore, Ronald Philip (1976). The Diploma Disease. Allen and Unwin. ISBN 9780043700761.
- Shinohata, a portrait of a Japanese village. 1978.
- "Goodwill and the spirit of market capitalism". British Journal of Sociology. 1983.
- Education in Tokugawa Japan. 1984.
- Flexible Rigidities. 1986.
- Stock Market Capitalism, Welfare Capitalism: Japan and Germany versus the Anglo-Saxons. 2000.

== Honors ==
- Fellow of the British Academy, 1974
- Association for Asian Studies (AAS), 1986 Award for Distinguished Contributions to Asian Studies
- Order of the Rising Sun (Third Class)
- Japan Foundation Prize (1977)
- Honorary Doctorate, Doshisha University (2008)
