= Keith Lewin =

British academic

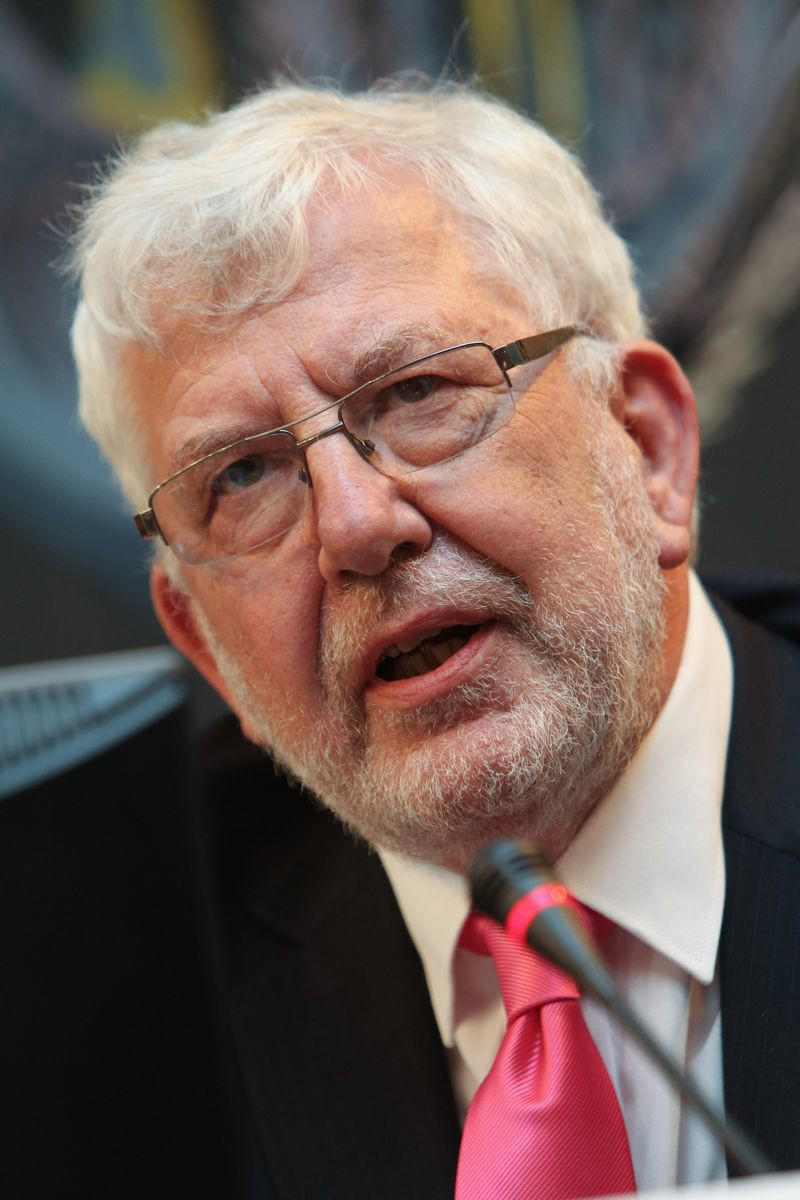
- Education: Manchester University (BSc.Hons, First 1971); Manchester University (MSc 1972); Institute of Development Studies (PhD 1981)
- Awards: Chartered Physicist; Academician of the Academy of Social Sciences; President of the British Comparative and International Education Society 2006–07; Honorary professor, Beijing Normal University; Honorary professor, Zhejiang University.
- Scientific career
- Fields: Educational planning and finance, economics of education, science education policy, assessment and evaluation, teacher education
- Doctoral advisor: Ronald Dore
- Website: keithlewin.net http://www.create-rpc.org

Keith M. Lewin is a British academic who is a professor of International education and Development at the University of Sussex and Director of the Consortium for Research on Educational Access, Transitions and Equity (CREATE). He is known for his work in educational planning, economics and finance of education, teacher education, assessment, science and technology education policy in developing countries, educational aid and program evaluation. He has been adviser to the World Bank, DFID, UNESCO International Institute for Educational Planning, UNICEF, UNDP and AusAID.

From 1995 to 2011 he was the Director of the Centre for International Education (CIE), at the University of Sussex, which he developed as an internationally recognised centre for research on education and development in low income countries. Lewin was the founding director of the master's degree program in International Education and Development at the University of Sussex. He has been grant holder for over £4.5 million worth of research and development project. Lewin is an honorary professor at Hangzhou University and Beijing Normal University. He is the author of numerous books, journal articles and reports on education and development.

== Early life and education ==
Lewin was born in Kent in the United Kingdom. He attended school in Kent and South London. From 1968 to 1971 he read physics at Manchester University where he graduated with a first class honours degree. He then went on to complete a Masters in Innovation and Science Policy jointly taught with Manchester Business School and wrote a thesis on the scientific research organisations that were supported by British aid. He then moved to the Institute of Development Studies in Sussex as one of its first graduate students. He joined a large multi-country project on education and development across six countries focusing on the "Diploma Disease" and the interface between education systems and labour markets. His thesis explored science education in Malaysia and Sri Lanka and the impact of externally supported innovations to improve access, quality and outcomes linked to development. In 1973/74 he took time out from his Doctorate to work with Voluntary Service Overseas teaching physics and maths in Kelantan, Malaysia. In 1977 he was appointed to a tenured post at the University of Sussex. He was appointed Reader in 1986 and Professor in 1995 when he became Director of the Centre for International Education. He is a chartered physicist and an Academician of the Academy of Social Sciences.

== Career ==
Lewin has worked in South East Asia with a focus on Malaysia, Sri Lanka, and India. In Malaysia he was a visiting lecturer at University Malaya whilst completing his doctorate working with colleagues in the Pusat Perkembangan Kurrikulum (PPK). Subsequently, he co-authored a report on science education in Malaysia published by the Malaysian Ministry of Education and the UNESCO International Institute for Educational Planning. In Sri Lanka, Lewin worked with the national curriculum centre and was then an advisor for the establishment of the National Institute of Education (NIE) for UNDP. He also contributed to the development of the Sri Pada College of Education for UNDP. In India, Lewin has worked with the National University of Educational Planning (NUEPA) on a large-scale programme of research on access and equity using household surveys and child tracking to understand more about why more than half the children in North Indian states fail to reach secondary school. CREATE, a research consortium that Lewin helped develop, has designed and developed a programme of empirical research involving large-scale household surveys and village-level school-based data collection. Lewin has worked with teams from Bihar, Tamil Nadu, and Madhya Pradesh and with the Ministry of Human Resource Development and NUEPA to develop state level framework plans for Rastriya Madhyamik Shiksha Abhiyan (RMSA).

Lewin established the first educational link programs in China with a UK university in the early 1980s after the end of the Cultural Revolution and the fall of the "Gang of Four". Hangzhou University in Zhejiang provided a centre for UK-China education links under the leadership of Wang Chengxu. The first phase of work centred around evaluating the impact of the 1986 Basic Education Law. This anticipated the global commitments made at the World Conference on Education for All (WCEFA) in Jomtien to universalise access to primary schooling, and followed from China's "Four Modernizations" drive to develop. A similar exchange was established with Beijing Normal University and Wang Yingjie. This led to a UNICEF supported program to research educational reform in three different districts – one rich, one poor, and one with a national minority population. This was consolidated into a book published by the UNESCO International Institute for Educational Planning. The study was replicated in 2009–2011 after twenty years of development had transformed many parts of urban and rural China. The new study show dramatic changes in all the case study areas and draws attention to changing patterns of horizontal and vertical equity and to large scale demographic changes related to internal migration. Lewin was made an Honorary professor at Hangzhou University (now Zheijiang University) in 1993 and at Beijing Normal University in 1994.

Lewin has worked in Sub-Saharan Africa. For ten years he worked with Ude Bude and colleagues on a network to support development for environmental science and agriculture programs across fourteen Sub Saharan African countries. Lewin was also Special Advisor to the Minister of Education in Mauritius on financing and the implementation of the Education Masterplan, supported by UNDP. Lewin started working in post apartheid South Africa in 1994. Lewin developed a link program with the University of Durban-Westville (UDW) and was instrumental in locating the Rockefeller Foundation funded African Children's Literacy in Science and Technology programme at UDW. He subsequently developed a close partnership with the University of the Witwatersrand to undertake research on access and equity in Gauteng and Eastern Cape. He was also the director of the Mpumalanga Primary School Initiative (MPSI).

Lewin developed and co-directed the Multisite Teacher Education Research Project (MUSTER) with Janet Stuart. This was the largest DFID funded education research project in the 1990s. It undertook empirical work in South Africa, Lesotho, Malawi, Ghana, and Trinidad and Tobago in initial teacher education and newly qualified teachers.

In 2001 Lewin was invited to be a senior consultant to the Government of Uganda and DFID to develop the national framework for Post Primary Education and Training (PPET). Subsequently, he was also senior consultant to the Government of Tanzania and the World Bank on finance for the Secondary Education Development Programme (World Bank) and for Planning Nine Year Basic Education in Rwanda, funded by DFID and the CfBT Education Trust.

His work in Ghana includes planning and financing teacher education and the extensive program of research of CREATE. In Malawi he has worked closely with the Centre for Educational Research and Training (CERT) in Zomba on secondary school financing and non-state schooling.

=== Bilateral and multilateral organisations ===
After presenting to the Bellagio Group of development partners in Mt St Marie, Quebec in 1981 he became increasingly involved in educational planning working closely with the UNESCO International Institute for Educational Planning (IIEP) in Paris where he developed approaches to planning in financial austerity and to planning science education. The latter developed over time and led to seminars on the development of science education at the World Bank and a book. Lewin's interests in financing led to an invitation from UNICEF to co-convene the Round table on "Educating all the Children: The Financial Challenge for the 1990s" at the World Conference on Education for All (WCEFA) at Jomtien, Thailand in 1990 and to the first estimates of the costs of Education for All and the reforms needed to create affordable systems. Downstream this resulted in a flow of activities related to addressing problems of sustainable financing for the expanded access to secondary schooling critical for development dependent on more knowledge intensive production and competitive service sector industries. This was the subject of a Round Table at the World Education Forum in Dakar in 2000 hosted by IIEP. Lewin's work on secondary school financing and development was presented in plenary to the Commonwealth Education Minister's Conference (CCEM 16) in Cape Town and to the Association for the Development of Education in Africa (ADEA) biennial meeting in Maputo. In the recent past UNICEF's program to undertake research on out of school children has drawn on models of educational exclusion developed by Lewin for CREATE. These models have also been used by DFID in its 2010 Strategy paper, and by AusAID in its 2011 Thematic Strategy for Education. They were recently presented in the opening plenary of the ninth meeting of the Forum of Education Minister's (FEdMM) in Vanuatu. Lewin gave the plenary address to the Commonwealth Minister's meeting in Mauritius in 2012 on the post 2015 development agenda for education. As a result, a Ministerial Committee was established with Lewin as technical advisor. The resulting matrix of goals, targets and indicators was published in January 2013.

== Research ==
Lewin's main research commitment since 2005 has been to develop the parallel program of work within the framework of the CREATE partnerships. Lewin established this research consortium with initial funding from DFID of £2.5 million. The consortium has undertaken research on access, equity and learning in basic education (including lower secondary schooling) in Bangladesh at BRAC University, India at National University of Educational Planning and Administration (NUEPA), Ghana at University of Education, Winneba and at University of Cape Coast, South Africa at the University of the Witwatersrand and with the Institute of Education, University of London, and the Centre for International Education, University of Sussex on a large scale with high level partners over five years. The research has also taken place on a smaller scale in Kenya, Malawi, China, and Sri Lanka in partnership with national teams of researchers. It has produced over 150 research products, including five books, 75 research monographs and four special editions of journals working with over 100 researchers. The research is summarised in the CREATE publication Making Rights Realities and all other research products are available at the CREATE website.

Lewin has directed several multi-country research and development programs that include the Multisite Teacher Education Research Project (MUSTER) exploring teacher education in Ghana, Lesotho, Malawi, South Africa, Trinidad and Tobago (funded by DFID), the Mpumalanga Primary School Initiative support program, the first major DFID project in education in South Africa, financing Secondary Education in Africa. A World Bank Secondary Education in Africa (SEIA) Program, financing Secondary Education in Developing Countries (funded by IIEP) in Malawi, Zimbabwe, Sri Lanka, China, Costa Rica and Francophone West Africa, science Education and Development (funded by IIEP and World Bank) exploring curriculum, pedagogy, planning and financing across a range of countries.

=== Planner's Paradox ===
Lewin has made several contributions to thinking and to the literature on education and development. He has explored the systemic aspects of educational innovation in low income countries. This generated the "Planner's Paradox". Innovation is needed where education systems fail to deliver quality learning equitably. Although innovation is needed, it can be disruptive, resource consuming, and may be unevenly implemented. As a result, innovation may adversely affect quality learning and equity. If the result is another innovation, the anticipated upward spiral to greater effectiveness and efficiency may become a downward spiral This is related to the result of "planning in terms of what ought to be rather than what is." This is also tied to the concept of "Zones of Improbable Progress (ZIPS), which Lewin developed, that characterise the pursuit of goals long after it has become clear they are unattainable in the time available.

=== Balanced development strategies ===
Lewin was one of the first analysts to consistently argue for balanced development strategies during and after the Jomtien World Conference on Education for All. Jomtien set the scene for an over emphasis on bi-lateral and multi-lateral support for primary schooling at the expense of investment in other education sub-sectors. This became evident as patterns of disbursement under Education for All programs shifted over the next decade.

Lewin's work on financing secondary expansion at IIEP (UNESCO), with the Secondary Education in Africa programme of the World Bank and in DFID advisor's retreats made a substantial contribution to shifting the emphasis to more balanced patterns of investment consistent with what many recipients of development assistance had long argued was needed.

=== Multi Site Teacher Education research programme ===
The Multi Site Teacher Education research programme, which Lewin co-directed, remains one of the few cross national studies of initial teacher education with an African focus. It explored in depth what happens to trainees before, during and after training in traditional college based programs and in more innovative distance delivery training. It provided a grounded insight into teacher education curricula and practicums and identified many aspects of more and less effective practice. In particular it drew attention to the importance of matching the duration and costs of training with likely career futures and the "half life of a trained teacher". In high turnover systems long periods of residential pre-career training often favoured by teacher educators can be very expensive and inefficient if many graduates do not become career teachers. Lewin showed it is better to rebalance investment between initial training and continuous professional development which delivers more training "just in time" to those who need it when they need it.

=== Consortium for Research on Educational Access, Transitions and Equity (CREATE) ===
Lewin's work in the CREATE consortium, with its extensive network of partners, has made a significant contribution to redefining policy dialogue around access, equity and learning outcomes. The "Zones of Exclusion" approach, developed within CREATE, has been used widely to unpack different aspects of exclusion and inclusion and has been used by DFID, AusAid, UNICEF, ADEA, UNESCO, and the World Bank. The "expanded vision of access" which includes enrolment and progression on schedule, high levels of attendance and time on task, and learning achievement consistent with grades, redefines access and is a reminder that it is not 65 million children who have no access to basic education as may be true in enrolment terms, but over 200 million who are unlikely to complete basic education successfully.

Its insights into the extent and consequences of over-age enrolment, which is endemic in many parts of Sub Saharan Africa and South Asia, are critical to the achievement of universal access – through to successful completion of – basic education, especially for girls. The findings illustrate how increased participation as a result of massive investments in Education for All programs have yet to provide as much benefit to the poorest as the middle poor. It also lead to confirmations that relate to the role of the state as "the provider of last resort" to the poorest, which provides a counterpoint to the arguments of those who believe that the role of the state in providing public goods like basic education to the poorest can and should be reduced. The country research reports of CREATE have all been launched at national level meetings attended by Ministers and development partners.

=== Indicators of progress ===
Lewin's work on indicators of progress has also been influential. His work provides insights into the issue that surround the distance between "target setters and target getters" and the risks that performance targeting leads to "gaming" the systems used to evaluate outcomes. It also highlights the "moral hazards" embedded in systems that reward progress by withdrawing support when goals are achieved, and the difficulties when performance asymptotically approaches a limit. He also highlights the difficulties of interpreting composite indices, such as Gross enrolment rates (GERs), net enrolment rates (NERS), gender parity indices (GPIs), and Education Development Indices (EDI), when changes in values in the same direction could indicate improvement or deterioration in performance.

== Publications ==
=== Selected books ===
- 1987 Education in Austerity; Options for Planners. Fundamentals of Educational Planning Series, International Institute for Educational Planning.
- 1990, Doing Educational Research in Developing Countries: Qualitative Strategies, with G. Vulliamy and D. Stephens, Falmer Press.
- 1992, Science Education in Developing Countries; Issues and Perspectives for Planners, International Institute for Educational Planning, Paris.
- 1993, Educating All the Children; Strategies for Primary Education in Developing Countries, with C. Colclough, Oxford University Press.
- 1994, Insights into Science Education; Planning and Policy Priorities in Malaysia, with S. Maimunah (eds.), International Institute for Educational Planning, Paris.
- 1994, Implementing Basic Education in China: Progress and Prospects in Rich, Poor and National Minority Areas, with Wang Ying Jie, International Institute for Educational Planning, Paris.
- 1994, Educational Innovation in China; Tracing the Impact of the 1985 Reforms, with A. W. Little, Xu Hui and Zheng Ji Wei, Longman.
- 1996, Educational Innovation in Developing Countries; Case Studies of Change Makers, with Janet S Stuart (eds.), MacMillan.
- 1997, Science Education and Development; Planning and Policy Issues at Secondary Level. Pergamon/International Institute of Educational Planning, with F. Caillods and Gottelmann-Duret, Paris.
- 2001, Financing Secondary Education in Developing Countries; Strategies for Sustainable Growth, with F. Caillods, International Institute for Educational Planning, Paris.
- 2003, Researching Teacher Education: New Perspectives on Practice, Performance and Policy, with Janet Stuart, DFID Research Series 49a.
- 2003, Changing Patterns of Teacher Education in South Africa: Policy Practice and Prospects, edited with Yusuf Sayed and Michael Samuel, Heinemann.
- 2003, Primary Teacher Education in Malawi: Insights into Practice and Policy, with Janet Stuart and Demis Kunje, DFID Research Series 49c.
- 2005, Non State Secondary Schooling in Sub Saharan Africa? Exploring the Evidence in South Africa and Malawi, with Yusuf Sayed. DFID, London.
- 2008, Strategies for Sustainable Financing of Secondary Schooling in Sub Saharan Africa. Secondary Education in Africa (SEIA): Africa Human Development Series; World Bank, Washington DC.
- 2011, Making Rights Realities: Researching Educational Access, Transitions and Equity. Research Report of the Consortium for Research on Educational Access, Transitions and Equity. Brighton: University of Sussex.

=== Selected chapters ===
- 2000, "The Cost of Culture: Some Dilemmas for Educational Investment in Mauritius" in F. Leach and A. W. Little (eds.) Education, Culture and Economics: Dilemmas and Prospects. Garland, New York 25pp.
- 2000, "Educational Development in Asia; Prospects, Problems and Priorities" in L. E. Malberg, S. E. Hansen and K. Heino (eds.), Basic Education for All: A Global Concern for Quality, Abo Akademi University, Sweden.
- 2001, "The Status of Secondary Schooling in Developing Countries" in K. M. Lewin and F. Caillods (eds.), Financing Secondary Education in Developing Countries; Strategies for Sustainable Growth. International Institute for Educational Planning, Paris.
- 2003 "Science Teacher Education Policy in Developing Countries" in K. O-saki, K. Hosea, and W. Ottevanger (eds.), Science Teacher Education in Africa, Ways Forward, Free University of Amsterdam, the Netherlands.
- 2003, "An International Perspective on Teacher Education Across the MUSTER Countries" in K. M. Lewin, M. Samuel M and Y. Sayed (eds.), Changing Patterns of Teacher Education in South Africa: Policy Practice and Prospects, Heinemann.
- 2004, "Planning Post Primary Education: A New Priority" in The Blackboard Jungle, South African Institute of International Affairs, Johannesburg.
- 2005, "Seeking Secondary Schooling in Sub-Saharan Africa: Four Fallacies, Four Foresights and Four Freedoms" in K King (ed.), Reintegrating Education, Skills and Work in Africa: towards informal or Knowledge Economies? Towards Autonomy or Dependency in Development?, Centre of African Studies, University of Edinburgh.
- 2006, "Costs and Finance of Multigrade – How Do the Books Balance?" in A W Little (ed.), Education for All and Multigrade Teaching: Challenges and opportunities, Springer, Dordrecht, Netherlands.
- 2007, "Why Some EFA and Millennium Development Goals Will Not Be Met: Difficulties with Goals and Targets", in L Chisholm, G Bloch G and B Fleisch (eds.), Education, Growth Aid and Development: Towards Education for All. Comparative Education Research Centre, University of Hong Kong.
- 2007, "The Limits to Growth of Non-Government Private Schooling in Sub-Saharan Africa" in G Walford and P Srivastava, Private Schools in Developing Countries, Symposium Books.
- 2011, "Four Decades of Educational Planning – Retrospect and Prospect", in N V Varghese and M Bray (eds.), Directions in Educational Planning: International Experiences and Perspectives, International Institute of Educational Planning, UNESCO Publishing, Paris
- 2012, "Nine Year Compulsory Education in China: What can be Learned from Two Decades of Development?" in Hangyin Qin (ed.), The Experience of Nine Year Compulsory Education in China, pp. 1–22 UNESCO Publishing, Beijing.

=== Selected journal articles ===
- 2009, "Access to education in sub-Saharan Africa: patterns, problems and possibilities." Comparative Education, 45 (2). pp. 151–174.
- 2009, "Education in Sub Saharan Africa: Researching Access, Transitions and Equity". Comparative Education, 45 (2). pp. 143–151.
- 2011, "Access to Education Revisited: Equity, Drop out and Transitions to Secondary School in South Asia and Sub Saharan Africa", International Journal of Education and Development, 31 (4). pp. 333–338.
- 2011, "Expanding Access to Secondary Education: Can India Catch Up?" International Journal of Education and Development, 31 (4). pp. 382–394.
- 2011, "The Policies, Politics and Progress of Access to Basic Education", Journal of Educational Policy, 26 (4). 477:483.
- 2011, "Policy Dialogue and Target Setting: Do Current Indicators of Education for All Signify Progress?" Journal of Educational Policy, 26 (4). pp. 571–589.
