= Engineer Mohammed Bashir Karaye Prize for Hausa Writing =

The Engineer Mohammed Bashir Karaye Prize for Hausa Writing is a Nigerian literature prize given to authors who publish in the Hausa language. Founded in 2007 by the widow of the prize's namesake, the Karaye Prize is funded by the Bashir Karaye Foundation and administered by the Association of Nigerian Authors, Abuja Chapter.
