= Balaraba Ramat Yakubu =

Nigerian author (born 1959)

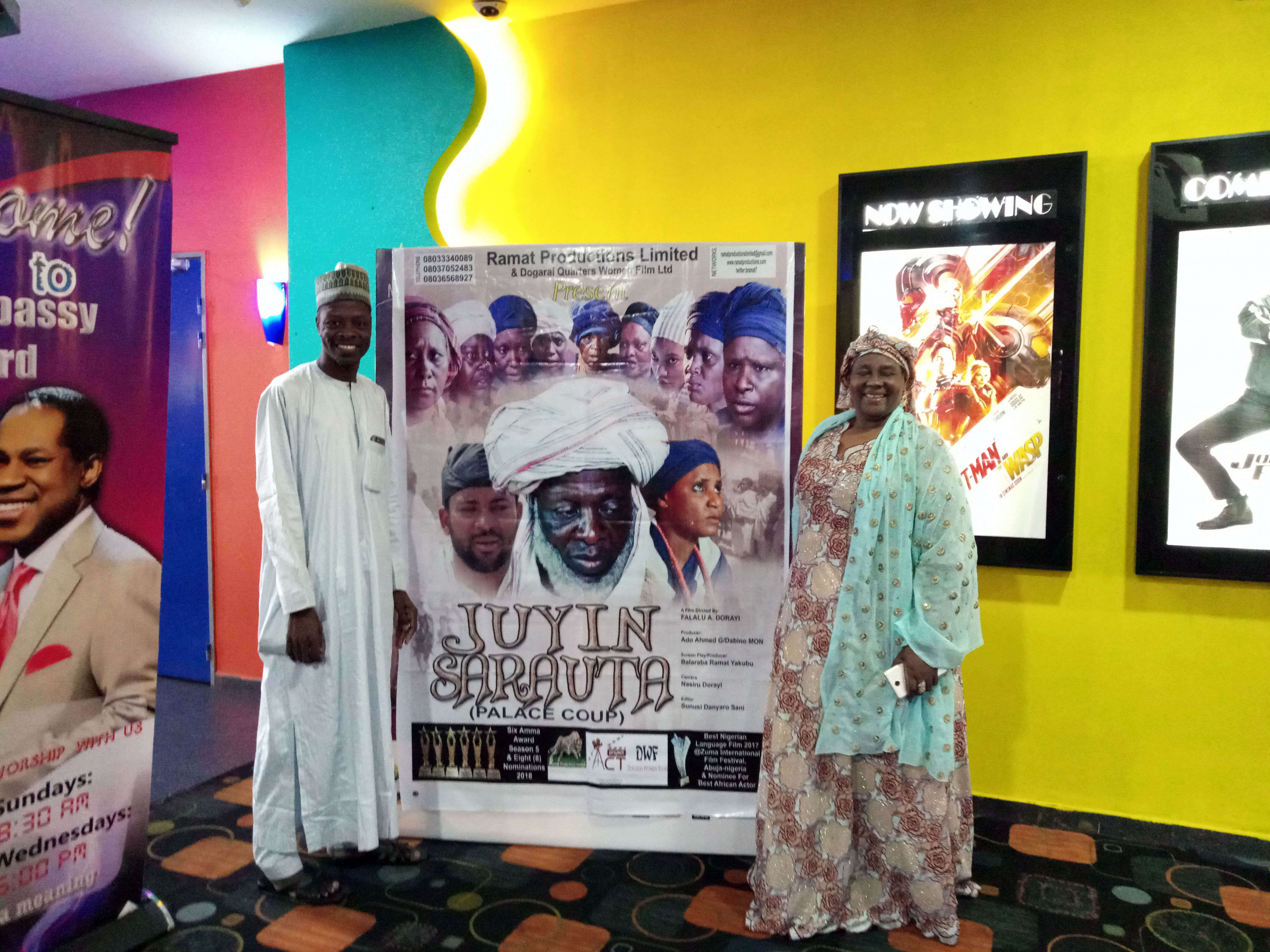
- Ado Ahmad Gidan Dabino MON with Balaraba Ramat Yakubu at Abuja during the premiere of the film Juyin Sarauta
- Born: 1959 (age 65–66); Kano, Northern Region, British Nigeria (now in Kano State, Nigeria)
- Occupation: Writer

Balaraba Ramat Yakubu (born 1959) is a Nigerian author who writes in Hausa. She is a leader in the genre of littattafan soyayya or "love literature", and one of the very few Hausa-language writers whose work has been translated into English. She has also worked as a screenwriter, producer, and director of Kannywood films. Her stories have focused on issues such as forced marriages and women's education.

== Early life ==
Balaraba Ramat Yakubu is the younger sister of General Murtala Ramat Muhammed, who briefly served as the military ruler of Nigeria from 1975 until his assassination in 1976.

At the age of 13, she was taken out of school and forced into an early marriage. She has said that this is the reason she writes in Hausa rather than English.

== Career ==
Balaraba Ramat started her career as the only woman member of the influential Kano-based writer's club Raina Kama. Her first novel, Budurwar Zuciya ("Young at Heart"), was published in 1987. Her second and third novels, Alhaki Kwikwiyo Ne... ("Sin Is a Puppy That Follows You Home") and Wa zai auri jahila? ("Who Will Marry an Ignorant Woman?"), followed in 1990. Alhaki Kwikwiyo Ne... was adapted into a film by Abdulkareem Muhammed in 1998.

An English translation of Alhaki Kuykuyo Ne..., Sin Is a Puppy That Follows You Home, was published in 2012 by Blaft Publications, an Indian publishing house, to positive reviews.

There is a literary prize named after her, the Balaraba Ramat Yakubu Literature Prize for Hausa Drama.

=== Films ===
Balaraba Ramat started producing film in 1990's with Wata Shari'ar and recently she wrote and produced Juyin Sarauta, a film that won about ten awards and received positive reviews from scholars and film experts

== Bibliography ==
- Kabir, Hajara Muhammad,. Northern women development. [Nigeria]. ISBN 978-978-906-469-4. OCLC 890820657.
