= UNESCO International Institute for Educational Planning =

The International Institute for Educational Planning (IIEP – UNESCO) is an arm of UNESCO created in 1963 in Paris, France, with Headquarters in Paris, and Regional Offices in Buenos Aires and Dakar. It develops the capacities of education actors to plan and manage their education systems through its programmes of training, technical assistance, policy research and knowledge sharing.

== Origins ==
A Committee chaired by Sir Alexander Carr-Saunders with Guy Benveniste as Rapporteur met in June 1962 and recommended the creation of the institute. The UNESCO General Conference adopted their recommendations in the fall of 1962 and the French Government provided a building to house this new institution. Philip Hall Coombs who had been the first Assistant Secretary of State for Educational and Cultural Affairs in the Kennedy administration, was appointed as its first director in 1963.

The institute, while an arm of UNESCO, was established as a semi-independent institution with its own board headed by a chair appointed by the Director General of UNESCO. Originally, the institute was financed jointly by UNESCO and the World Bank (IBRD) since that second institution was just beginning to finance educational projects in developing countries. Help was also provided in those first years by the Ford Foundation. Later, it was integrated more closely with, and financed mainly by, UNESCO. The institute organized its first major seminar in the spring of 1964 when 80 participants from Latin America attended meetings in Paris. The first publication from this encounter was issued in 1965.

== Mission ==
As the only specialized organization with the mandate to support educational policy, planning and management, IIEP plays a unique role within the United Nations system. IIEP's mission is to strengthen the capacity of countries. It helps UNESCO's Member States to manage their educational system and to achieve the Education 2030 Agenda.

The International Institute for Educational Planning offers training in educational planning and management, but also explores fields such as statistical tools for educational planning, strategies and policy options, projects, budgets, monitoring and evaluating educational quality and access. Its programs are designed for planners, policy-makers and researchers. IIEP targets both institutions and individuals, and works in both the national and international arenas.

IIEP's research projects identify new approaches that planners could adopt to improve equity, access and quality in the various educational sectors. Costs and financing, along with governance and management, are also important research fields at IIEP.

IIEP's technical assistance projects offer on-site coaching to ministry planning departments, so that they can quickly become autonomous in the performance of their basic duties. By building the capacity of individuals and of local, regional and national institutions, IIEP's technical assistance enables countries to make the most of their own expertise and to minimize their use of outside consultants. For instance, IIEP has created tailored programs to help governments in emergencies and fragile contexts, to maintain or rebuild their educational system.

== IIEP and Education Sector Planning ==
IIEP supports ministries of education to plan and prepare their education sector plans through long-term technical involvement or more focused interventions.

Making progress in education demands that countries have a clear vision of their priorities and how to achieve these. Many ministries therefore prepare strategic plans, which reflect this vision and help mobilize people and resources. Strategic planning guides educational development by giving a common vision and shared priorities. Educational planning is both visionary and pragmatic, engaging a wide range of actors in defining education's future and mobilizing resources to reach its goals. A wide range of ministries worked in partnership with IIEP to develop their plans.

In some countries, the institute supports the whole process of formulation, implementation, monitoring and evaluation of these plans; in others, it offers advice and assistance in specific areas as requested by the ministry. In all cases, the joint efforts is aimed at strengthening the capacity and autonomy of ministries and their staff.

IIEP gives special attention to working with countries faced with the challenges of emergencies and reconstruction (sometimes referred to as ‘fragile’ contexts) which are farthest away from achieving the EFA and the MDG goals.
