= Amadeus University, Amizi, Abia State =

Private university in Amizi, Nigeria

Coordinates: 5°22′14″N 7°34′59″E

- Type: Private University
- Founder: Dr. Godwin Nwabunka
- Accreditation: 2023
- Vice-Chancellor: Prof. Samuel Nzotta
- Location: Amizi, Abia, Nigeria
- Campus: Suburban
- Website: https://amadeus.edu.ng/

Amadeus University, Amizi, Abia State is a private university. It is located at Amizi community in Ikwuano Local Government Area of Abia State, Nigeria. It was given a license to operate by the National Universities Commission (NUC). It was one of the 37 new private universities approved for academic programs in 2023. In a bid to support education, Amadeus University offered scholarships for some of its pioneer class of 2024/2025 session. According to the management, " these scholarships, which collectively offer 50 fully funded, and 15 partial scholarships, cover tuition, service, and accommodation fees, enabling recipients to focus on their academic and career aspirations."

== Accreditation ==
In May 2021, NIC summary reports on accreditation stated a full accreditation status with 91.00% on Entrepreneurship under Administration and Management. In June 2023, resource verification was carried out by the university which the NUC successfully cleared. The academic activities started on October 28, 2024. The 2025/2026 NUC accreditation approved the following programs at the university: Law, Medicine & Surgery, and Pharmacy. These programs started off in the 2025/2026 session.

Amadeus University had approval to operate 19 undergraduate degree programs. The following faculties were approved: Allied Health Sciences, Engineering, Science and Computing, Social and Management Sciences. Again, the Council for the Regulation of Engineering in Nigeria, (COREN) also approved Engineering courses for the Amadeus University.

== Matriculation ==
Amadeus University had its first matriculation ceremony on February 8, 2025. It was the maiden matriculation ceremony where the Senate President of Nigeria, Godswill Akpabio declared the university open. During the matriculation ceremony, the Vice Chancellor, Prof Nzotta, "called on the Federal Government to review the Tertiary Education Trust, TETFund, mode of operations to enable it to provide research grants to scholars in private universities."

== Administration ==
- Founder: Dr. Godwin Nwabunka
- Pro-Chancellor: Prof. Mrs. Ihuoma Roseline Ndimele
- Vice-Chancellor: Prof. Samuel Nzotta
- Burser: Mr. Augustine Ugorji.
- Registrar: Mr. Ernest O. Onuoha
- University Librarian: Dr. Ngozi Ukachi.
