= Mustapha Ahmad Isa =

Nigerian academic

Mustapha Ahmad Isah

Vice-chancellor Yusuf Maitama Sule University, Kano
- In office 2015–2020
- Preceded by: Professor Dato' Dr. Mohd Razali Agus
- Succeeded by: Professor Mukhtar Atiku Kurawa

Director ICT Bayero University Kano
- In office 2013–2015
- Preceded by: Professor
- Succeeded by: Professor

Personal details
- Born: May 28, 1965 (age 61) Kano State
- Education: Indiana University; Bayero University Kano
- Profession: Professor

Mustapha Ahmad Isa is an Academician and is the 2nd substantive Vice chancellor of Yusuf Maitama Sule University, Kano. Mustapha served for good five year 2015 to 2020 who was succeeded by Professor Mukhtar Atiku Kurawa.

== Early life and education ==
Mustapha was born in May 1965 at Yola Quarters, a local government in Kano State, Nigeria. He started his primary education at Shahuci primary school (1977). He attended Yolawa Union School and got his Islamiyya certificate there. Mohammed got his B.A in Hausa Language (1987) from Bayero University, Kano. He got Masters (1990) and Doctorate degree (1994) at Indiana University, Bloomington, Indiana, USA, with a minor and major in applied English and theoretical linguistic respectively.

== Career ==
Mustapha is a Professor of English language. He has served as Director of Academic planning, university orator, Director of centre for research in Nigerian languages as well as member of Governing council at Bayero University, Kano.

== Publications ==
Mustapha has various publications which he authored and co-authored.
