= Mohammed Sanni Abdulkadir =

Nigerian academic

Mohammed Sanni Abdulkadir Listen

4th Vice Chancellor of Kogi State University
- In office ?
- Preceded by: Prof. Hassan S. Isah

Personal details
- Born: Dekina, Kogi State, Nigeria
- Occupation: Academician
- Known for: A political and economic history of Igala land, Central Nigeria (1896-1939)

Academic work
- Discipline: History

Mohammed Sanni Abdulkadir (born 16 February 1953) is an academic and is the 4th Vice Chancellor of Kogi State University. Mohammed was appointed by the Governor of Kogi State, Capt. Idris Ichalla Wada to take over from Prof. Hassan S. Isah.

== Early life and education ==
Mohammed was born at Dekina, a local government in Kogi State, Nigeria. He started his primary education at Native Authority primary school (1958-1966) where he later proceeded to Arabic central school at Idah (1967-1969). He attended College of Arts and Islamic Studies, Sokoto (1970-1975) before gaining admission to school of preliminary studies Abdullahi Bayero College (1976-1977). Mohammed Sanni Abdulkadir obtained his Bachelor’s, Master’s, and Doctor of Philosophy degrees in History from Bayero University, Kano, completing his PhD in 1990.

== Career ==
He began his academic career as a Graduate Assistant in the Department of History at Bayero University, Kano in 1981. He was promoted to Professor of Economic History in 2000. At Bayero University, he also served as Head of the Department of History and held administrative positions, including Deputy Dean of the Postgraduate School.

== Publications ==
His publications include the monograph A Political and Economic History of Igalaland, Central Nigeria: 1896–1939.

== Affiliations ==
He is associated with professional academic bodies in Nigeria, including the Historical Society of Nigeria.

== Awards ==
He is reported in biographical sources to have received the People Conference for Peace Award in 2008.

== Personal life ==
He is married with children.
