= Mukhtar Atiku Kurawa =

Nigerian academic

Former Vice-chancellor Northwest University, Kano
- In office 2020 – Oct 2025
- Preceded by: Mustapha Ahmad Isa
- Succeeded by: Prof Aisha Garba Habib

Rector Kano State Polytechnic
- In office 2016–2020
- Preceded by: Dalahatu Galadanci
- Succeeded by: Kabiru Bello Dungurawa

Personal details
- Born: August 28, 1970 (age 56) Kano State
- Education: University of Bristol; Bayero University Kano
- Profession: Professor
- Website: https://www.nwu.edu.ng/news.php

Mukhtar Atiku Kurawa (born 28 August 1970) is a professor of Inorganic Chemistry, Nigerian academic, administrator, and the former Rector of Kano State Polytechnic, the 3rd substantive Vice Chancellor of Yusuf Maitama Sule University, Kano.

== Early life and education ==
Kurawa was born on 28 August 1970, at Kurawa quarters, of Kano municipal Local Government Area, of Kano State. He attended Yolawa Islamiyya Primary School, Kano between 1976 and 1981, he also attended Government Secondary School, Rano and Government Secondary School Kofar Nassarawa between 1981 and 1983. Kurawa also attended Science Secondary School Dawakin Tofa between 1983 and 1986, obtained Bachelor of Science in Chemistry and Master of Science in Inorganic Chemistry from Bayero University Kano 1991 and 1999 respectively. Kurawa also obtained a Doctor of Philosophy in Inorganic Chemistry at the University of Bristol, United Kingdom in 2005.

== Career ==
Kurawa was the Lecturer under faculty of Science of Bayero University Kano, Department of Chemistry where he held so many responsibilities from committees member, Level Coordinator, up to Head of Chemistry Department in 2011 and became the Dean, Faculty of Science in 2015 and also promoted to the rank of professor of Inorganic Chemistry in the same year.

Kurawa was appointed Rector of Kano State Polytechnic in 2016 by Kano State Governor Abdullahi Umar Ganduje where he served for four years and he was appointed the 3rd substantive Vice-Chancellor of Yusuf Maitama Sule University, Kano on 2 October 2020 by the Governing Board of the University where he assumed office on 22 October 2020. Kurawa was also a member of the tenth (10th) Governing Board of the Joint Admissions and Matriculation Board (JAMB).

Kurawa had a lot of publications within and outside the Nigeria.
