= Bayero University Kano =

Public university in Kano, Nigeria

- Other name: BUK
- Former names: Ahmadu Bello College, Abdullahi Bayero College, Bayero University College
- Motto: "وفوق كل ذي علم عليم"
- Motto in English: "...and above every possessor of knowledge there is one more learned"
- Type: Public, research
- Established: 4 October 1962
- Accreditation: NUC
- Academic affiliations: ASUU, SSANU, NAAT
- Vice-Chancellor: Haruna Musa
- Location: Kano, Kano State, Nigeria; 11°58′50″N 8°28′46″E
- Campus: Urban
- Colours: Turquoise
- Website: www.buk.edu.ng

The Bayero University Kano (BUK) is a university situated in Kano, Kano State, Nigeria. It was founded in 1975, when it was renamed from Bayero University College and upgraded from university college to university. It is the first university in Kano State, North-western Nigeria.

== History ==
Bayero University initially was Ahmadu Bello College. The college was named after the Premier of Northern Nigeria, Ahmadu Bello. It was founded in January 1960 by the Northern Nigeria Ministry of Education headed by Isa Kaita to prepare senior secondary certificate holders for General Certificate of Education (G.C.E.) and A-level in Arabic, Hausa, Islamic History, Islamic studies and English Literature. Upon the establishment of Ahmadu Bello University in Zaria, Kaduna State, Ahmadu Bello College was renamed to Abdullahi Bayero College, after Abdullahi Bayero, Emir of Kano and soon thereafter it became a faculty, admitting its first set of ten undergraduate students for a B.A. degree programme of Ahmadu Bello University. This first set graduated in 1966 but it continued as a faculty of ABU until 1980.

Initially located on the grounds of the School of Arabic Studies near the palace of the Emir, the college moved to a location at the old Kano Airport Hotel, where it remained until March 1968, when it moved to Western Kano to make way for a military hospital (the Nigerian Civil War having started the previous year). The first students began their studies in February 1964, and they graduated in July 1966.

In 1975, the college became a university college, and was renamed Bayero University College, with Mahmud Tukur as principal. In 1977, it was given university status as Bayero University, with Tukur as vice-chancellor. In 1980, the university ceased functioning as a faculty of Ahmadu Bello University in Zaria.

== Ranking ==
Bayero University Kano was ranked as number 1016 in the world universities ranking in 2023.

== Academic sections ==
The academic sections in Bayero University consist of colleges, faculties, centres, institutes and schools.

=== College of health science ===
The colleges in the university are:

- College of Health Science The college of Health Sciences is made up of the following faculties: Faculty of Allied Health Sciences, Faculty of Basic Medical Sciences, Faculty of Clinical Sciences and Faculty of Dentistry.
- Colleges of Natural and Pharmaceutical Sciences The College of Natural and Pharmaceutical Sciences is made up of the following faculties: Faculty of Life Sciences, Faculty of Pharmaceutical Sciences and Faculty of Physical Sciences.

The remaining faculties in Bayero University are:

- Arts and Islamic Studies
- Agricultural Sciences
- Computer Science and Information Technology
- Communication
- Engineering
- Earth and Environmental Sciences
- Education
- Law
- Management Sciences
- Social Sciences
- Veterinary Medicine

The research centres include: Centre for Advanced Medical Research, Centre for Infectious Diseases, African Centre for Excellence in Population Health and Policy, Centre for Gender Studies, Centre for Islamic Civilisation and Inter-faith Dialogue, Centre for Dryland Agriculture, Centre for Biotechnology Research, Centre for Renewable Energy and Centre for Research in Nigerian Languages, Translation and Folklore Centre for Information Technology, among others. The university also houses the International Institute of Islamic Banking and Finance (IIIBF), the only one of its kind in the country.

== Location ==
The main campus of the university is located approximately 12.8 kilometers (roughly 8 miles) from the city along the Kano-Gwarzo Road i.e. along Janguza road. There is another site (Old Campus) at BUK Road.

== Library ==
The university Library was established in 1964 in order to support the university in achieving its goals of teaching, learning and research. The library acquires, processes, preserves, organises and disseminates information resources in printed and electronic format. It is a modern Library with modern technology that enables easy access to information resources by staff and students. The Library strives to meet the information need of both staff, students and researchers by designing selective dissemination of information in forms of alerts services. It also subscribes to electronics databases of international standards which give s users access to information resources irrespective of location, time and place.

=== Branch Libraries ===
Bayero University library is divided into nine branch libraries that are located in different campuses of the university as follows:

S/N	LIBRARIES	LOCATION
1	MAIN LIBRARY	MAIN CAMPUS
2	AGRIC LIBRARY	MAIN CAMPUS
3	EDUCATION LIBRARY	MAIN CAMPUS
4	ENGINEERING LIBRARY	MAIN CAMPUS
5	SCIENCES LIBRARY	OLD CAMPUS
6	LAW LIBRARY	MAIN CAMPUS
7	MEDICAL COLLEGE LIBRARY	AKTH ZARIA ROAD, KANO
8	AMINU KANO CENTRE FOR DEMOCRATIC RESEARCH AND TRAINING MAMBAYYA HOUSE LIBRARY	NO. 57/58 GWAMMAJA, KOFAR RUWA ROAD, KANO.
9	SOCIAL AND MANAGEMENT SCIENCES LIBRARY	MAIN CAMPUS

The university's main campus is home to the Main Library, which also serves as the headquarters. The Main Library has two Phases - The Main Phase and the subsequent Phase.

The Library's Stages oblige the accompanying Units and Areas:

==== Main Library Unit And Section ====
FIRST PHASE		SECOND PHASE	
SECTION/UNIT	LOCATION	SECTION/UNIT	LOCATION
RESERVE SECTION	GROUND FLOOR	AUTOMATION DEPARTMENT	GROUND FLOOR
I. ADMIN UNIT II. REFERENCE SECTION	FIRST FLOOR	REFERENCE SECTIONS	FIRST FLOOR
CIRCULATION UNIT	SECOND FLOOR	CIRCULATION UNIT	SECOND FLOOR
DOCUMENT	THIRD FLOOR	SERIALS SECTION	THIRD FLOOR
ARABIC AND ISLAMIC RESOURCES	FOURTH FLOOR		

== List of leaders ==
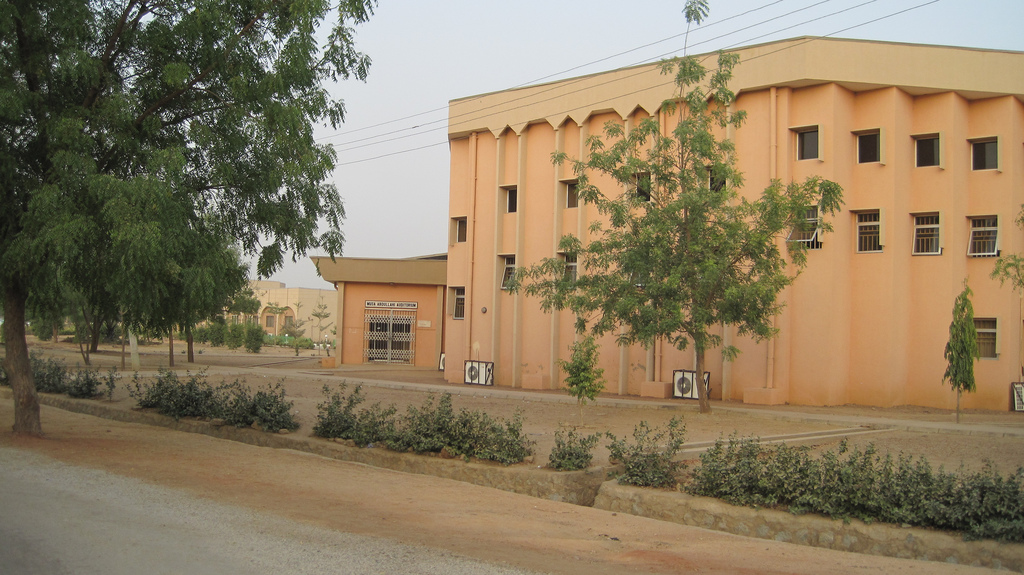
Bayero University Kano campus

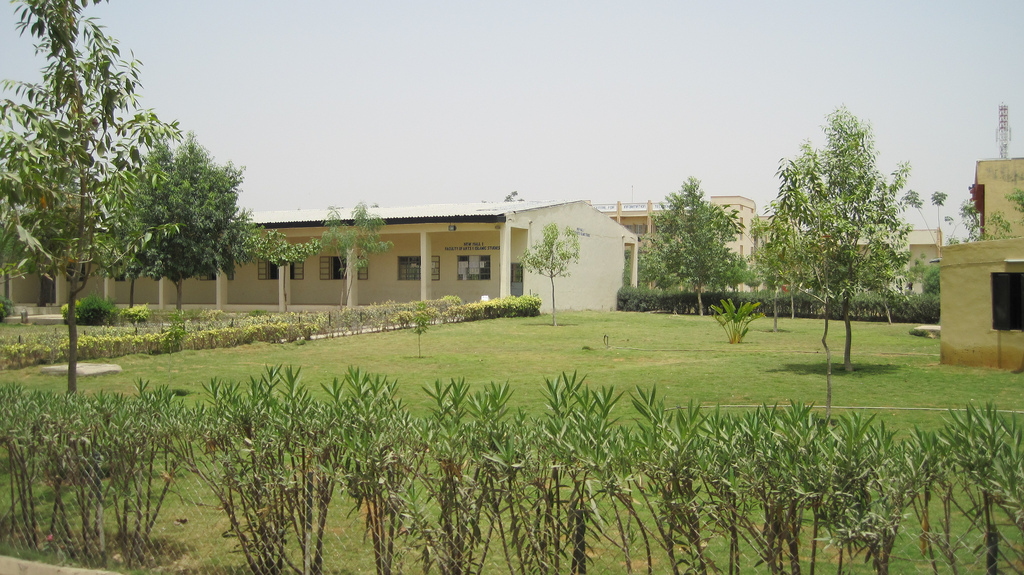
Bayero University Kano campus

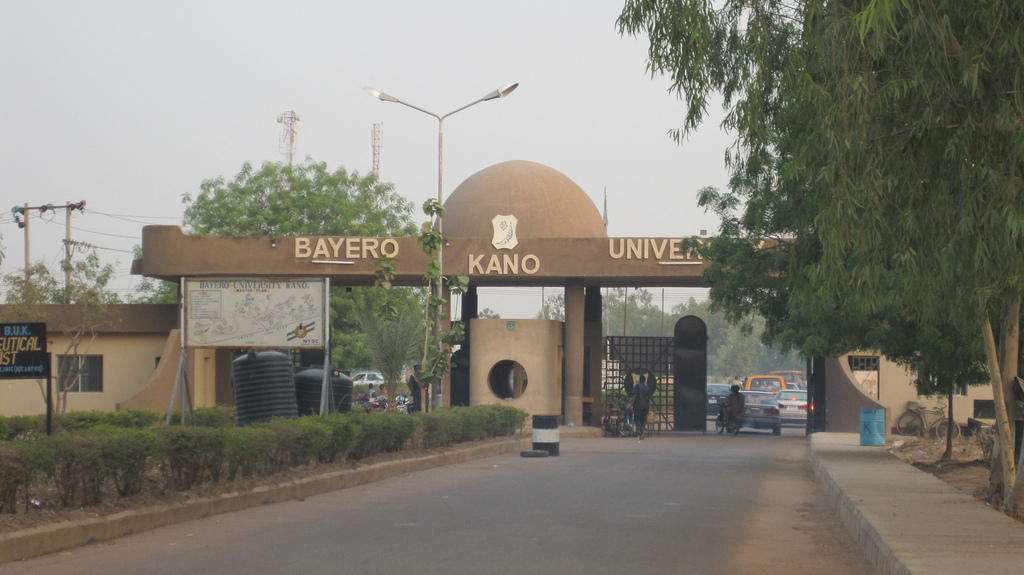
New site gate

=== SAS Principal (and director of college section) ===
1. Aliyu Abubakar Dr. Aliyu Abubakar was born in Nafada in the present Gombe State in the year 1909. He attended University of London, where he studied a bachelor of art degree in English language. After serving as a principal at the school of Arabic studies Kano, he also served as the first commissioner of Education in Bauchi State after its creation in 1976. He died in November 1987.

=== Provost of Abdullahi Bayero College ===
1. Abdalla Eltayeb (1964–1966)
2. Hamidu Alkali (September 1966 – November 1969)
3. Shehu Galadanci (1969–1975)

=== Principal of Bayero University College ===
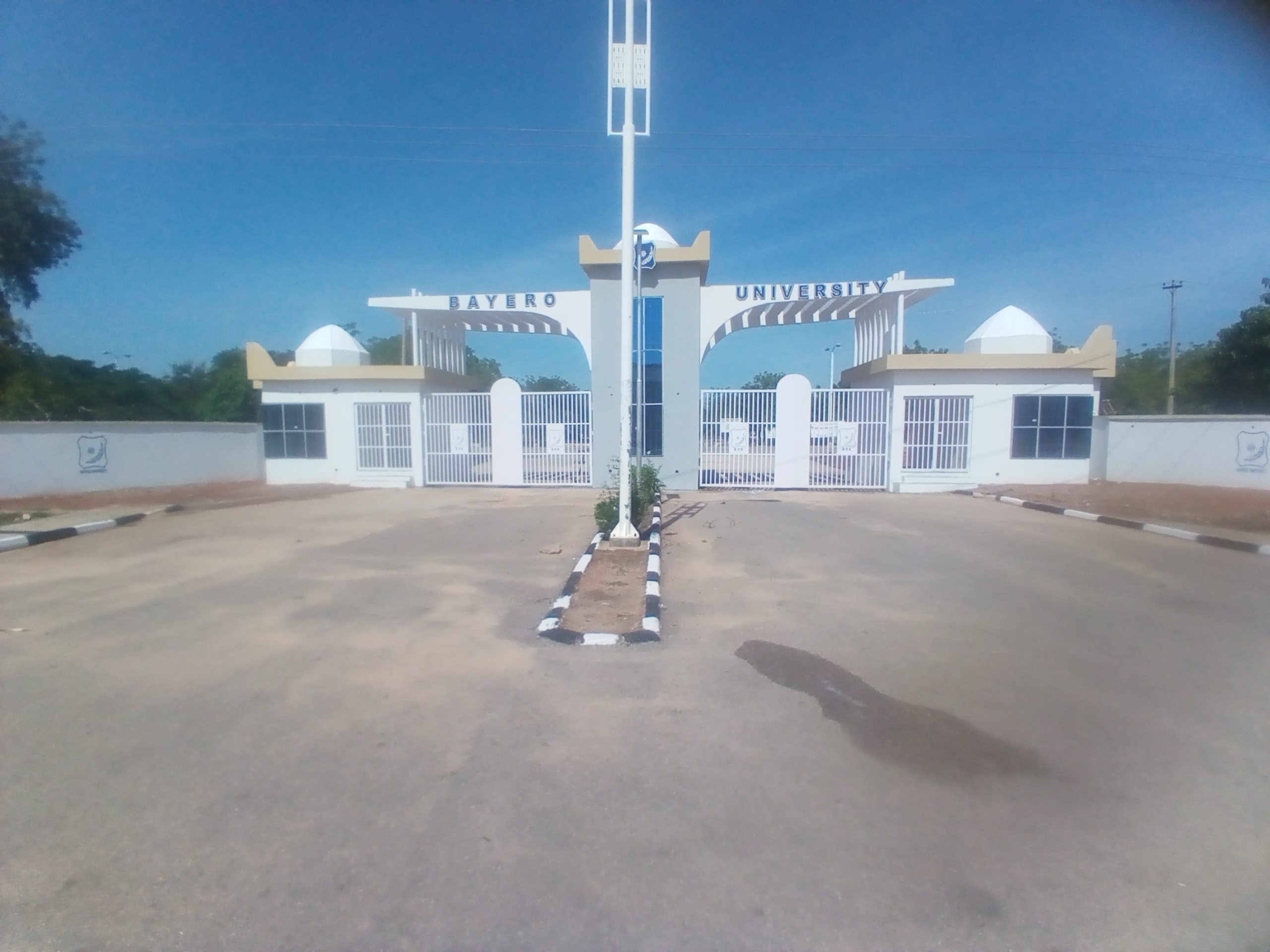
1. main gate entrance old campus
  Mahmud Tukur (September 1975 – 1977)

=== Vice chancellor ===
1. Mahmud Tukur (1975 – October 1977)
2. J. O. C. Ezeilo (1977–1978)
3. Ibrahim Umar (1979–1986)
4. Dandatti Abdulkadir (1986–1990)
5. M. Sani Zakraddeen (1990–1995)
6. Bello Bako Dambatta (1995–1999)
7. Musa Abdullahi (August 1999 – 2004)
8. Attahiru Muhammad Jega (September 2004 – 2010)
9. Abubakar Adamu Rasheed (June 2010 – 17 August 2015)
10. Muhammad Yahuza Bello (Tuesday 18 August 2015 – 17 August 2020)
11. Sagir Adamu Abbas (17 August 2020 – July 2025)
12. Haruna Musa (1 July 2025 - Present)

== Project and Commission ==
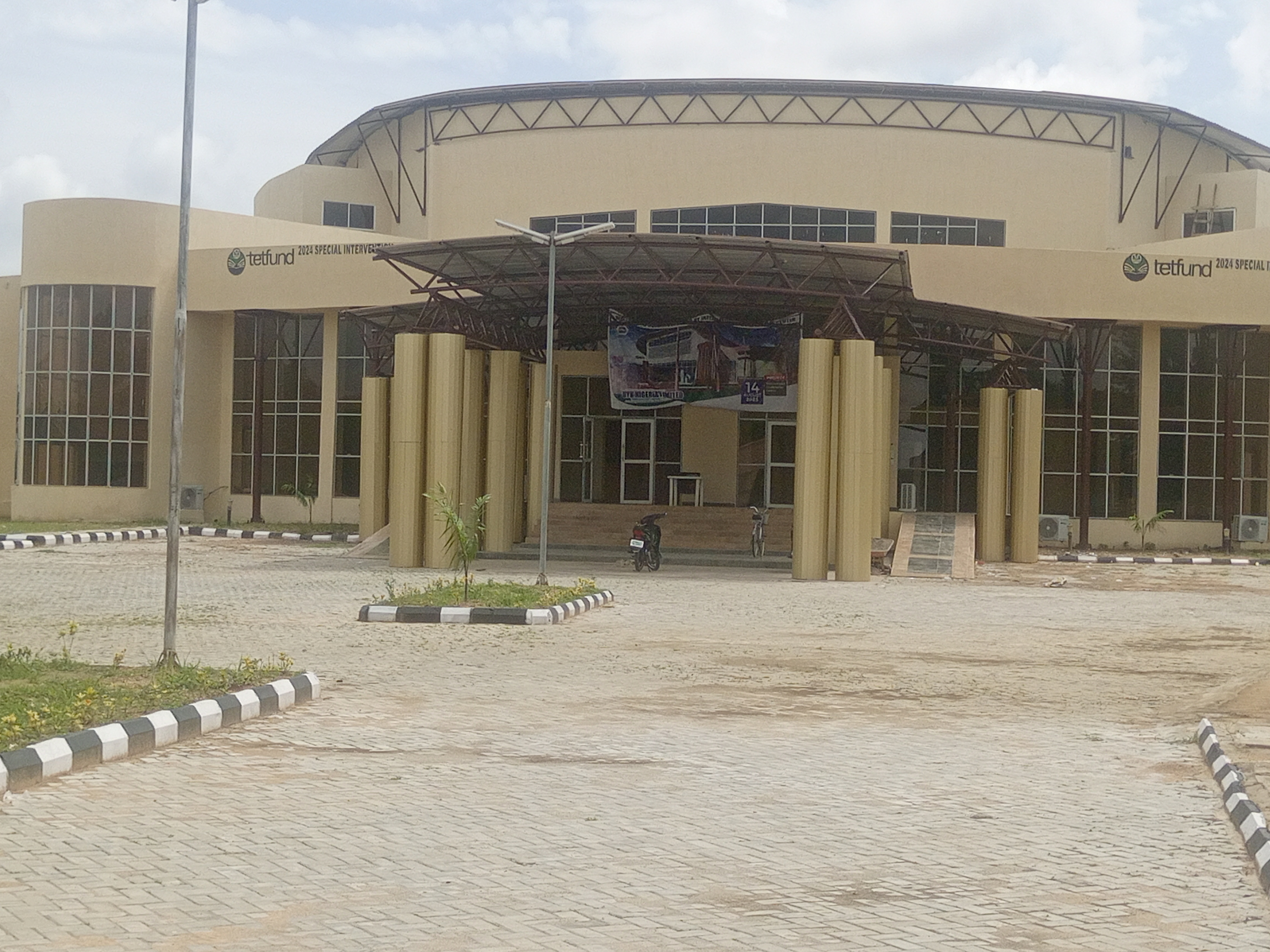
Conference center

On 15 August 2025 an international conference center was commission in the school the center was commissioned by the executive secretary of tetfund Sonny Echono.

On 12 August the old campus main entrance gate was commission by the former vice chancellor Sagir Abass.

== People ==
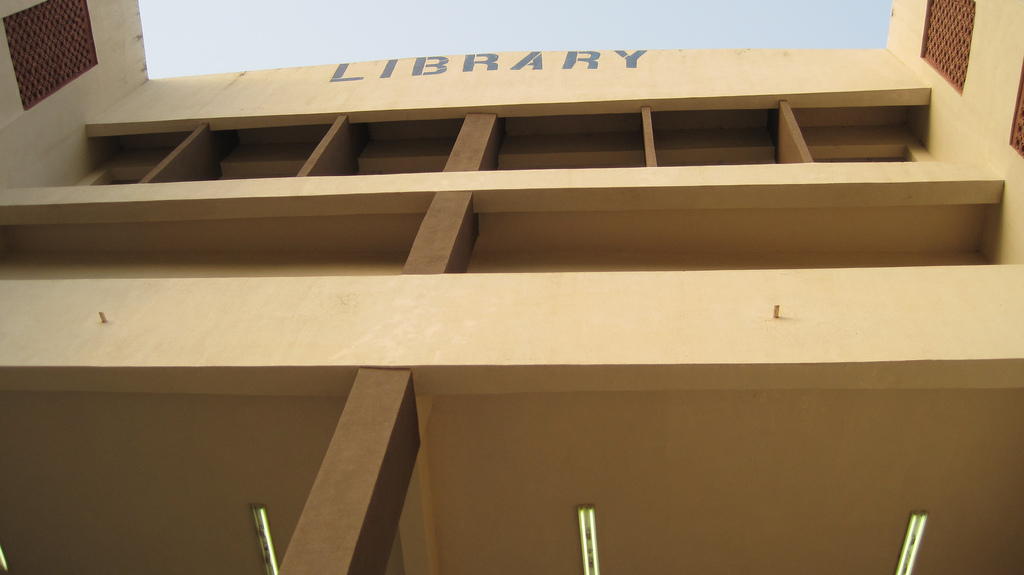
Bayero University Kano library

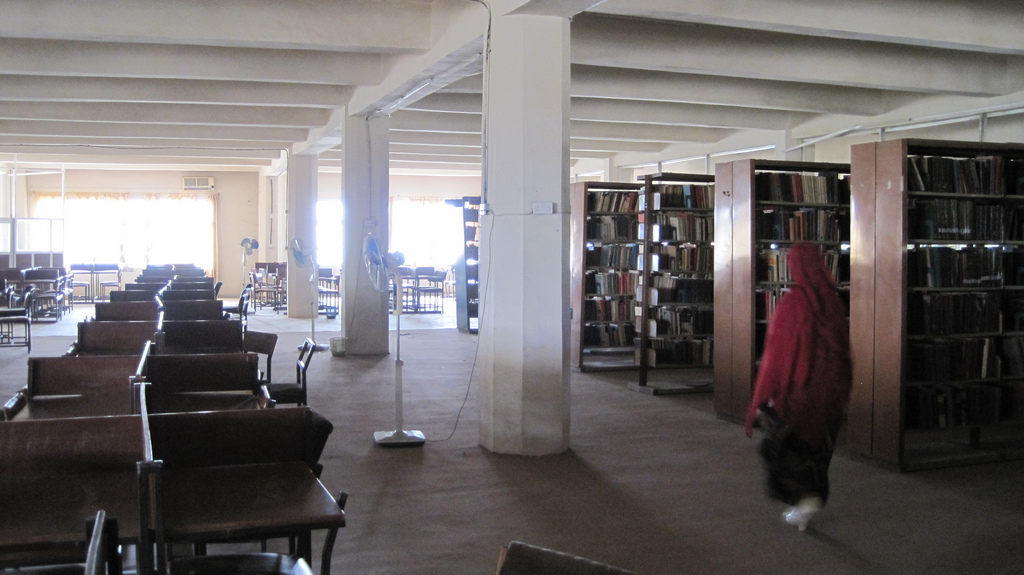
Bayero University Kano library

=== Notable alumni ===
- Ahmed Adamu, petroleum economist and lecturer
- Mansur Dan Ali, Minister of Defence
- Zaynab Alkali, author
- Jumai Bello, managing director Bauchi Radio Corporation
- Zuwaira Gambo, commissioner of women affairs and poverty development, Borno state
- Abba Gumel, Professor of Mathematics, Arizona State University
- Mukhtar Shehu Idris, politician, Governor-elect of Zamfara State
- Farooq Kperogi, author, columnist, journalism professor at Kennesaw State University
- Farouk Lawan, politician
- Mohammed Mabdul, Nigerian diplomat and former ambassador to Algeria
- Saleh Mamman, Nigerian minister of power
- Moses Ochonu, historian, author
- Salisu Usman Ogbo, Rector of Kogi State Polytechnic, Lokoja
- Rabia Salihu Sa'id, physicist
- Ibrahim Sheme, novelist, journalist, publisher
- Yushau Shuaib, author
- Jamilah Tangaza, journalist, former head of BBC Hausa
- Ahmad Sani Yerima, former governor, Zamfara State
- Musa Sani Nuhu, Nigeria’s Permanent Representative to the Economic Community of West African States (ECOWAS) from 2020 to 2025.

=== Notable faculty ===
- Abdalla Uba Adamu
- Stewart Brown
- Abdul Haleem Chishti
- Reginald Cline-Cole
- Bello Bako Dambatta
- Hafsat Ganduje
- Abdulrazak Gurnah, Nobel Prize in Literature 2021
- Mukhtar Atiku Kurawa

=== Holders of honorary degrees ===
- Yayale Ahmed
- Abdullahi Bayero
- Theophilus Danjuma
- Muammar Gaddafi
- Aminu Kano
- Nelson Mandela
- Murtala Mohammed
- Yusuf Maitama Sule

== Affiliated colleges ==
- Sa'adatu Rimi University of Education Kano
- Jigawa State College of Education

== See also ==
- List of Islamic educational institutions
- List of universities in Nigeria
- Education in Nigeria
