= University of Health Technology, Otukpo =

University in Benue, Nigeria

Coordinates: 7.19875351°N 8.14278549°E

University of Health Technology, Otukpo is a state-owned institution in Benue State, Nigeria, established to train skilled health professionals and support the healthcare system through education, research, and innovation.

== History ==
The concept for the University of Health Technology, Otukpo, originated as part of the Benue State Government's strategic initiative aimed at addressing the shortage of trained healthcare professionals in the state and throughout Nigeria. Officially approved and established in the early 2020s, the university was founded under the leadership of then-Governor Samuel Ortom. Its creation was intended to expand access to health-related tertiary education and enhance healthcare delivery within the region.

== Academic focus ==
The university is focused on academic and professional programs in various fields of health sciences, including:

- Medicine and Surgery
- Nursing Science
- Medical Laboratory Science
- Public Health
- Environmental Health
- Health Information Management
- Radiography
- Physiotherapy
- Biomedical Engineering
- Pharmacy (planned)

== Campus and facilities ==
The university is located in Otukpo, a major town in the southern part of Benue State. Its main campus is designed to include state of the art teaching hospitals, laboratories, lecture halls, libraries, and student accommodation. The university's infrastructure is being developed to meet international standards for medical and health technology education.

== Governance ==
The University of Health Technology is governed by a Governing Council appointed by the state government, with the Vice-Chancellor serving as the chief academic and administrative officer. The university is accredited by the National Universities Commission (NUC) of Nigeria.
