= Amal Hassan =

Nigerian technology entrepreneur

- Born: Amal Hassan kano
- Education: Bayero University Kano
- Occupation: Technology Entrepreneur
- Years active: 2015–present
- Known for: Founder Of Outsource Global
- Awards: 1. Fortune-US Department of State Global Women's Mentoring Partnership (2018) - Recognized as one of 16 outstanding women leaders worldwide. 2. Leadership in Nigeria's BPO Industry - Her innovative approach and dedication to upskilling Nigerian youth, especially through Outsource Global, have brought her widespread acclaim.
- Website: https://www.outsourceglobal.com/

Amal Hassan is a Nigerian technology entrepreneur and chief executive officer at Outsource global providing outsourcing destinations which she started in 2013. In 2018, she was one of 16 women business leaders named among the 2018 Fortune-US Department of State Global Women's Mentoring Partnership and regarded as a role model for the girl-child in northern Nigeria.

She was appointed alongside six others on the Nigeria's 3MTT Advisory Committee to increase the chances of digital employability for Nigerian youths. This committee was set up by The Federal Ministry of Communications, Innovation, and Digital Economy.
