= Marietu Tenuche =

Nigerian academic

- Born: 29 September 1959 (age 66); Kogi state
- Citizenship: Nigerian
- Occupation: Lecturer
- Spouse: Tenuche Mohammed

Marietu Ohunene Tenuche (born 29 September 1959) is a Nigerian academic, author and a professor of political science. She is the fifth and the first female vice chancellor of Kogi State University, now Prince Abubakar Audu University. Tenuche was appointed by the Governor of Kogi State, Yahaya Bello to take over from Professor Mohammed Sanni Abdulkadir.

== Early life and education ==
Tenuche was born on 29 September 1959. She obtained her West African School Certificate from Government Girls Secondary School Yola in 1976. She obtained a B.Sc political science degree, M.Sc. political science and later a PhD political science degree all from Ahmadu Bello University.

== Academic career ==
Tenuche began her academic career in 1982 as a lecturer at Kwara State Polytechnic, Ilorin, where she was until 1992. She was appointed Lecturer 1 in the Department of Political Science of the University at the inception of the institution in 2000 where she rose through the ranks to become professor of political science in 2011.

She had previously served as the dean, Faculty of Social Sciences (2000-2006), deputy vice chancellor, academic (2004-2006, and 2008-2011) and deputy vice chancellor, administration (2011-2013).

She was appointed as the acting vice chancellor of Kogi State University on 7 April 2020 and later confirmed as the vice chancellor. Until her recent appointment as the vice chancellor of Kogi State University now Prince Abubakar Audu University, she was the dean, School of Postgraduate Studies and chair, Committee of Deans and Directors.

== Personal life ==
She is married to pharmacist Professor Muhammed Tenuche, and they have four children.
