= Suleiman Elias Bogoro =

Nigerian animal scientist

Professor Suleiman Elias Bogoro FNIAS, FNSAP, FCOASN, FASAN, FFPNO, FSPSP, D.Sc (h.c), FAS & DAS
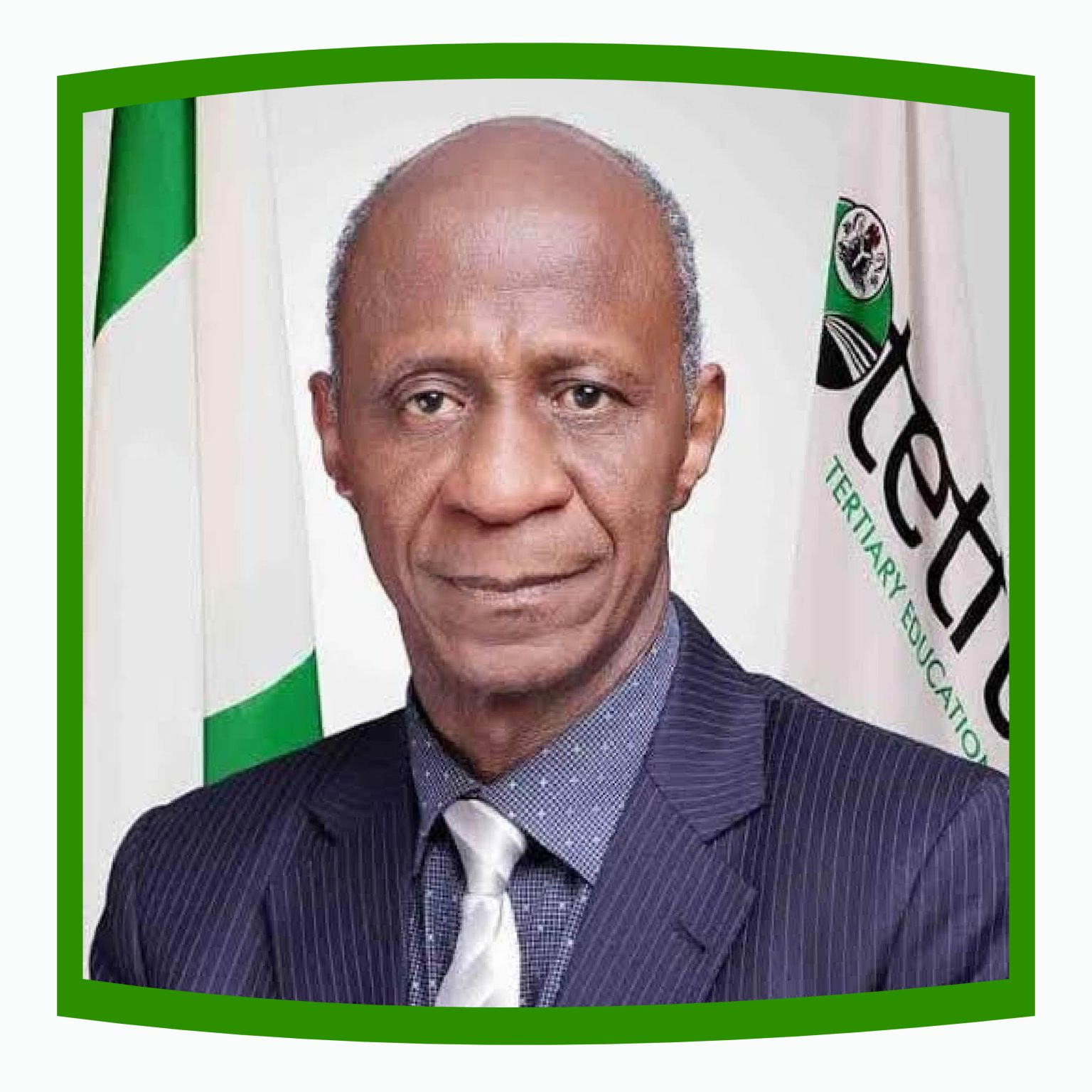

8th Executive Secretary of TETFund
- In office 21 January 2019 – 18 March 2022
- Appointed by: Muhammad Buhari
- Preceded by: Abdullahi Baffa Bichi
- Succeeded by: Sonny Echono

5th Executive Secretary of TETFund
- In office 15 April 2014 – 15 February 2016
- Appointed by: Goodluck Jonathan
- Preceded by: Aliyu Na'Iya
- Succeeded by: Aliyu Na'Iya

Personal details
- Born: June 6, 1958 (age 67)
- Spouse: Hon. Justice Yellim Bogoro
- Children: 3
- Education: Professor
- Occupation: Lecturer/Researcher
- Website: https://profbogoro.com/

Suleiman Elias Bogoro (born 6 June 1958) is a professor of Animal Science, specializing in Biochemistry and Ruminant Nutrition, who served as the 5th and 8th Executive Secretary of Tertiary Education Trust Fund (abb. TETFund) in Nigeria.

== Early life and education ==
Bogoro, a local of Gwarangah in Bogoro Local Government Area of Bauchi State, obtained a bachelor's degree in (B.Sc. in Agriculture) from the University of Maiduguri in 1981. After that, he acquired an M.Sc. in Animal Science from Ahmadu bello University, Zaria in 1988, later he earned a Ph.D. in Animal Science from Abubakar Tafawa Balewa University (A.B.T.U) with composite research and bench-work similarly divided among A.T.B.U, The Rowett Research Institute, Aberdeen, Scotland, and The Department of Clinical Veterinary Medicine, University of Cambridge, United Kingdom. By 2003 he was promoted to the rank of professor in Animal Science at ATBU, Bauchi

== Career ==
=== Executive secretary, TETFund, Nigeria ===
Bogoro was named as the Executive Secretary of TETFund in April 2014 by President Goodluck Jonathan. In his first residency, he prompted the production of the Department of Research and Development at TETFund. He was disengaged on 15 February 2016 by President Muhammadu Buhari, who later restored him as Executive Secretary on January 21, 2019, having been examined and found not guilty. The Federal Government expressed that his disengagement "ab initio" was done in error. On 2 March 2022, Muhammad Buhari appoint Sonny Echono, to take over from Elias, following the end of his administration.

=== Professor of animal science ===
Bogoro became a professor in 2003. He has been published in local and international journals and has mentored postgraduate understudies through master and Ph.D. programs. He has lectured in diverse areas of development challenge and policy.

=== Consultant ===
Bogoro has been a consultant, team leader, and project manager in several international, national, and regional projects such as,

- Principal Investigator, African Centre of Excellence/World bank on Food Security. (2012-2013)
- Principal Investigator, Step B Food Security Centre for Excellence Team Leader UNESCO Climate Change Project Proposal. (Reviewed by UNESCO, Paris France) (2011-2012)
- Consultant/Team Leader, North-West Multisectoral Development Indices evaluation Project of National Bureau of Statistics/UNICEF. (2007)
- Consultant to the Federal Ministry of Labor & Productivity on Job creation and Poverty Reduction Action Plan of Nigeria’s NEEDS/SEEDS program, Bauchi/Gombe States. (2004)
- Member, Presidential Committee on National Food Security and Food Policy for Nigeria. (2000)
- National Consultant/Team leader for UNDP “Fourth country program for Nigeria. (Livestock sub-sector) (1992-1996)

== Professional membership & fellowship ==
=== Memberships ===
Bogoro is a member of the following professional bodies.

- Nigerian Institute of Animal Science.
- British Society of Animal Science.
- Nigerian Society of Animal Production.
- Animal Science Association of Nigeria.
- Society for Peace Studies, and Practice, Presidential Committee on Alternative Livestock Feed Formulation and Food Security.
- Nigerian Journal of Animal Production.
- Journal of Arid Agriculture and Science forum.

=== Fellowship ===
He is also a fellow in the following organizations.

- Animal Science Association of Nigeria.
- Society for Educational Management.
- Nigerian Academy of Science.
- Nigerian Society for Animal Production.
- Nigerian Institute of Animal Science.
- Nigerian Institute of Animal Science.

== Awards and recognitions ==
Bogoro has received several award over the years including:

- 2021 - Animal Science Hall of Fame, Nigeria.
- 2019 - Leadership Public Service Person of the Year.
- 2019 - Business Day Excellence in Public Service.
- 2019 - Special Recognition award of Nigerian Society of Animal Production.
- 2017 - Agricultural Development and Practice Award Landmark University.
- 2016 - African Achievers Award for Excellence and Service to Humanity.
- 2015 - Nigerian Society for Animal Production Captain of Industry Award.
- 2008 - Distinguished Education Merit Award by the National Union of Bauchi State Students (NUBASS).
- 2006 - Distinguished Merit Award for Excellence and Community Service by the Lagos branch of Zaar Development Association (ZDA).

== Publications ==
- Luka, J. S, BOGORO, S. E. and Dantata, I. J. (2011): Traditional management of pigs in Bogoro and Tafawa Balewa local government areas. Journal of sustainable development, Vol. 8, No. 1/2 pp45–50
- Ngele, M. B, Adegbola, T. A. BOGORO, S. E, Abubakar, M. M and Kalla, D. J. (2010). Nutrient intake, digestibility and growth performance in yankasa sheep fed urea-treated or untreated rice straw with supplements. Nigeria journal of animal production, Vol 37, No. 1 and 2, pp 61–70
- Ngele M. B: Adegbola T. A, BOGORO. S. E. and Kalla. D. J. U (2010). Studies of some ruminal and Blood Metabolites in Sheep Fed Poor Quality Roughage with Supplementation. International Journal of Tropical Agriculture and Food Systems, 4(1): 62-67
- Bello K. M., Oyawoye E. O. and BOGORO S. E. (2009): Effect of Different Processing Methods on the Chemical Compositions of Palm Kernel Meals. Animal Production Research Advances, 5(1): 61-64.
- BOGORO, S. E (2005). Simulating the biological engineering efficiency of the rumen towards national food security. 34th Inaugural Lecture of the Abubakar Tafawa Balewa University, Bauchi. (26-7-2005)
- Aletor, V. A, Olatunji, O. and BOGORO, S. E, 2014. Harnessing Nigeria’s endogenous research and innovation outcomes for food and nutrition Security, West-Africa Research and Innovation Management Association (WARIMA) 2014. In proceedings of WARIMA 2014 international conference, Elizade University, Ilara-Mokin, Ondo State, Nigeria, October 24–26, 2014.
- BOGORO, S. E. (2014). Traditional African livestock production in an era of technology driven agriculture: The Nigerian scenario; Proceedings of the biennial international conference on African culture and human security held at the Olusegun Obasanjo UNESCO presidential library, Abeokuta, Nigeria, March 3–5, 2014.
- Bello K. M., Oyawoye, E. O. BOGORO, S. E., and Dass U. D. (2011): Performance of broilers fed varying levels of palm kernel cake. International journal of poultry science, 10(4): 290- 294
- Luka, J. S, BOGORO, S. E. and Dantata, I. J. (2011): Traditional management of pigs in Bogoro and Tafawa Balewa local government areas. Journal of sustainable development, Vol. 8, No. 1/2 pp45–50
- Bello, K. M, Oyawoye, E. O, and BOGORO, S. E. (2011): Response of cockerels to graded level of local and industrially processed palm kernel meal (Elaeis guineensis). African journal of agricultural research, Vol. 6 (27), pp. 5934–5939)
- Akande, K. E, Abubakar, M. M, Adegbola, T. A, BOGORO, S. E. and Doma, U. D (2010). Origin and uses of some unconventional plant protein sources. Proceedings of the 35th annual conference of Nigeria Society of Animal Production, University of Ibadan, Nigeria, March, 2010. pp 433–435
- BOGORO, S. (2010). Trends in urinary purine derivative technique of determining rumen microbial protein synthesis. Nigerian journal of agricultural technology, school of agriculture/agricultural Technology, A.T.B.U, Bauchi, Nigeria; Vol No 1:87-105.
- Yisa, A. G, Diarra, S. S, Edache, J. A, and BOGORO, S. E. (2010): Utilization of differently processed pigeon pea (Cajanus cajan. (L) Millsp) seed meal by broilers. Nigerian journal of experimental and applied biology, 11(1): 69-78.
- Ngele, M. B, Adegbola, T. A, BOGORO, S. E, Abubakar, M and Kalla, D.J.U (2010). Nitrogen balance and metabolite study in yankasa rams fed rice straw with supplementation. Journal of environment, technology and sustainable agriculture,1(1):1-7.
