= Jumai =

- Gender: Female
- Language(s): Hausa

Origin
- Word/name: Nigeria, Worldwide.
- Meaning: Born on a Friday

Jumai is a Nigerian name basically used among the Muslims and common among the Hausas. Jumma'a meaning "Friday" (of Arabic origin). The name Jumai is a female given name which means "born on Friday". The name Jumai is a diminutive of Jummai, Dan Juma, Jumaiah, Jumaiyah. Its other forms for male names are Jummah, Jimoh etc.

== Notable individuals with the name ==
- Jumai Bello (born 1941), Nigerian media executive.
- Jumai Bitrus (born 1996), Nigerian Volleyball player.
- Jumai Babangida Aliyu (born 1959), Nigerian Teacher.
