= Haruna Musa =

Nigerian polymer scientist and academic administrator

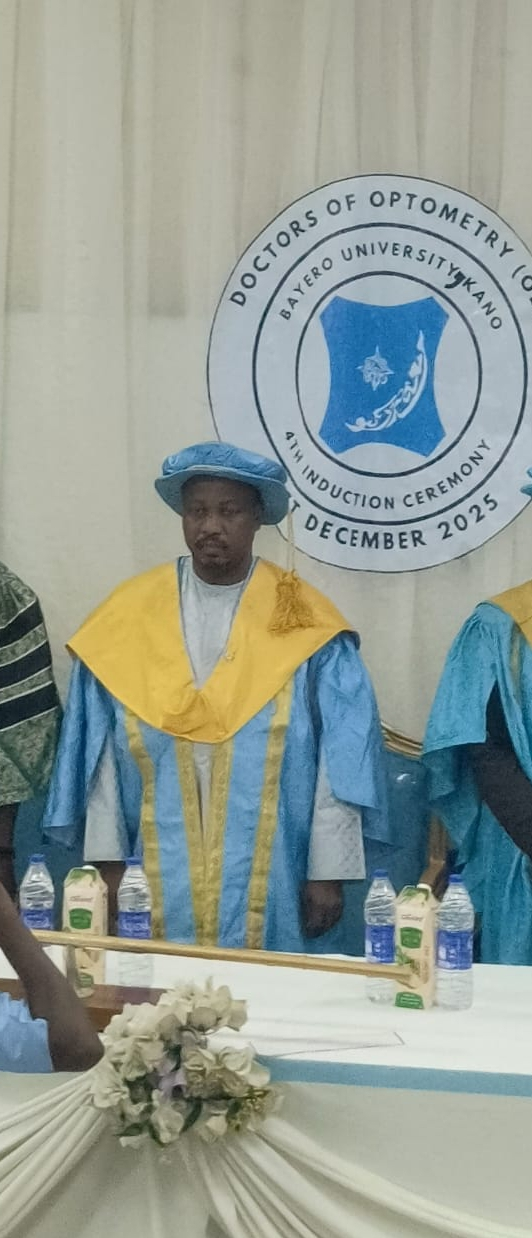
- Born: Danbatta, Kano state
- Citizenship: Nigeria
- Occupations: academic and polymer scientist
- Title: Professor

Academic background
- Education: Bayero University Kano

Haruna Musa is a Nigerian academic and polymer scientist who is the 12th Vice chancellor of Bayero University Kano state.

== Early life and education ==
Haruna Musa was born in Danbatta local government of Kano state, Nigeria. He attended Government Secondary School Dambatta in 1985 and proceeded to Bayero University, Kano, where he obtained a bachelor's degree in chemistry in 1991. Haruna earned his master's degree in polymer chemistry in 1999 and later completed a PhD in the same field at the University of Bristol in the United Kingdom in 2009.

== Career ==
Haruna joined Bayero University in 1993 as a graduate assistant and became a professor in 2019. He was a former HOD Pure and Industrial Chemistry and is the immediate past Chairperson of BUK branch of the Academic Staff Union of Universities. He also served as the Deputy Director the Centre for Renewable Energy and Sustainability Transition (CREST).

On 3 March 2025, Haruna Musa assumed office as the university's Deputy Vice chancellor academics.
