= Sule Lamido University =

Public university in Jigawa State, Nigeria

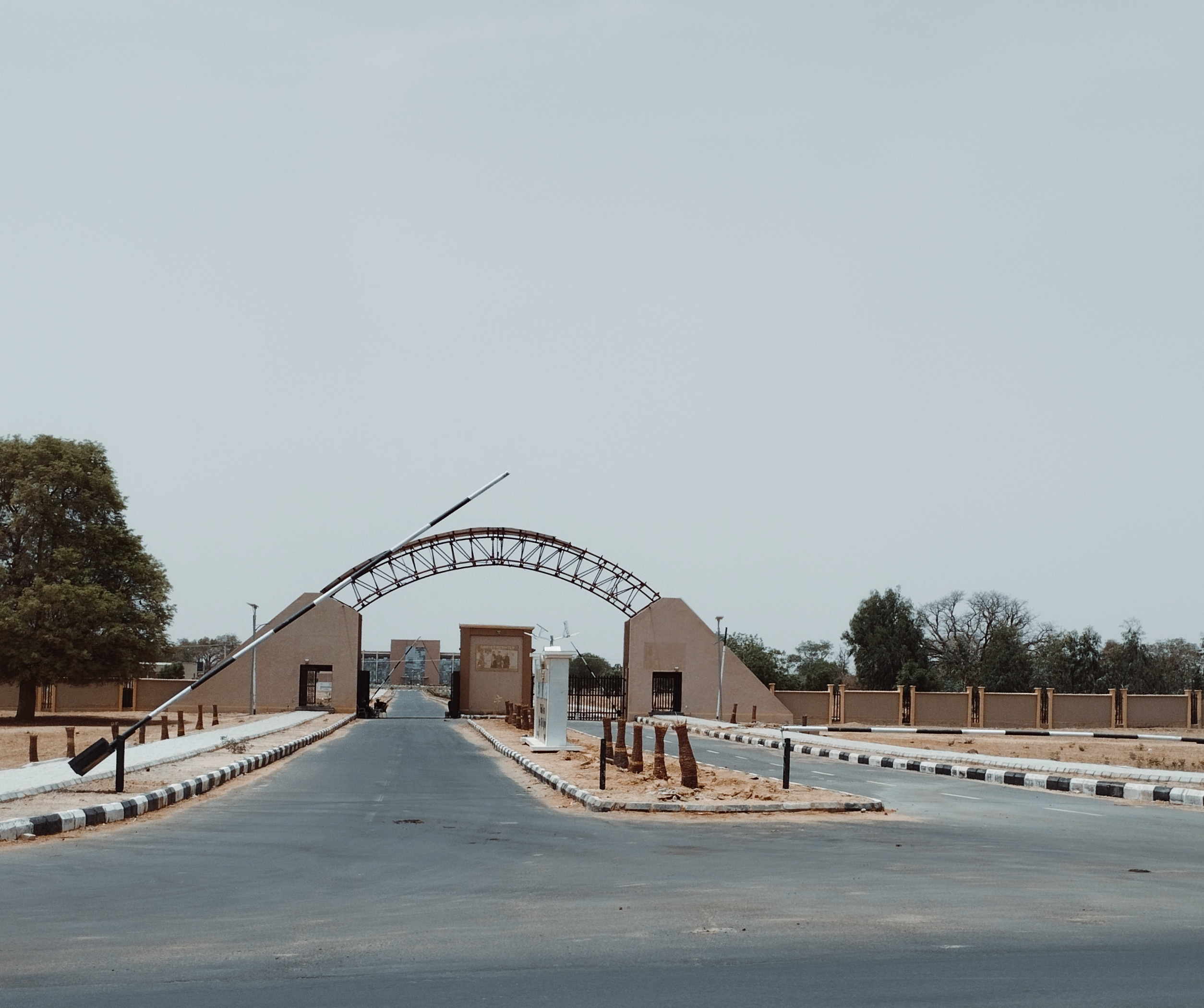
- Type: Public
- Established: 13 May 2013
- Affiliations: Association of African Universities (AAU) Academic Staff Union of Universities (ASUU) National Universities Commission (NUC)
- Vice-Chancellor: Professor Muhammad Ibrahim Yakasai
- Pioneer Vice Chancellor: Abdullahi Yusuf Ribadu
- Location: Kafin Hausa, Jigawa State, Nigeria
- Campus: Urban
- Website: www.slu.edu.ng

Sule Lamido University is a state-owned public university located in Kafin Hausa, Jigawa State, Nigeria. It was established 13 May 2013, licensed by National Universities Commission in July 2013 as Jigawa State University and full academic activities commenced in September 2014.

In December 2014, a bill by the Jigawa State House of Assembly effectively renamed the university to its current name.

== Undergraduate Courses Offered ==
Faculty of Education

- B.A. (Ed) English
- B.Sc. (Ed) Biology
- B.Sc. (Ed) Chemistry
- B.Sc. (Ed) Mathematics
- B.Sc. (Ed) Physics
- Faculty of Humanities
- B.A. Arabic
- B.A. English
- B.A. Hausa
- B.A. History
- B.A. Islamic Studies
- Faculty of Natural and Applied Sciences
- B.Sc. Biology
- B.Sc. Chemistry
- B.Sc. Computer Science
- B.Sc. Mathematics
- B.Sc. Physics

== Postgraduate Courses Offered ==
- Faculty of Computer
- Department of Computer Science
- Master of Science in Computer Science
- PhD in Computer Science
- Postgraduate Diploma in Computer Science
- Faculty of Education
- Department of Education
- Master in Education
- PhD in Education
- Postgraduate Diploma in Education
- Faculty of Humanities
- Department of Islamic Studies
- Master of Arts in Islamic Studies
- PhD in Islamic Studies
- Postgraduate Diploma Islamic Studies
- Department of Physics
- Master of Science in Physics
- PhD in Physics
- Postgraduate Diploma in Physics (PGDP)
- Department of Mathematics
- Master of Science in Mathematics
- PhD in Mathematics
- Postgraduate Diploma in Mathematics
