= Prince Abubakar Audu University =

Public university in Anyigba, Nigeria

Coordinates: 7.480942°N 7.187462°E

- Other name: Prince Abubakar Audu University (PAAU)
- Former name: Kogi State University
- Motto: Knowledge for self reliance
- Type: Public
- Established: 1999
- Officer in charge: Vice Chancellor
- Chairman: Prof Adam O. Ahmed
- Vice-Chancellor: Prof. Salisu Usman Ogbo
- Academic staff: 10
- Students: 50,000
- Undergraduates: 43,000
- Postgraduates: 6,570
- Doctoral students: 330
- Location: Anyigba, Nigeria
- Website: paau.edu.ng

Prince Abubakar Audu University (formerly known as Kogi State University), located at Anyigba, is a state-owned university of Kogi, Nigeria. It was established in 1999 during the administration of Governor Abubakar Audu. At the time of its establishment, it was known as Kogi State University, It was later renamed Prince Abubakar Audu University (PAAU) in 2020 after the then governor of Kogi State by Governor Alhaji Yahaya Adoza Bello in respect of late Abubakar Audu.

Professor S.K. Okwute (Professor of Chemistry) was the pioneer Vice Chancellor (2000–2005). Professor F.S. Idachaba (OFR), Professor of Agric-Economics, took over between 2005 and 2008 and then retired to work in his foundation (F.S. Idachaba Foundation for Research and Scholarship) before his death. Professor I. Isah (Professor of Chemical Pathology), from Ahmadu Bello University, Zaria, took over in October 2008, he was succeeded by Prof. Mohammed Abdulkadir from Ado Bayero University. The incumbent Vice Chancellor is Professor Marietu Tenuche.

In 2017 the Academic Staff Union of Universities (ASUU) KSU chapter was locked in an industrial crisis with the state government over non payment of salaries for several months. The state government accused the lecturers of politicising the industrial dispute and ordered their immediate return to class room or would their positions declared vacant for fresh applications. After several days of refusal to return to the class, Governor Bello who was visitor to the school announced the proscription of ASUU and its withdrawal from the national body.

== Library ==
The library supports learning and research among students and staff in the institution.

=== E-library ===
The library offer Electronic library services

== Faculties (Colleges) ==
Prince Abubakar Audu University has eight (8) faculties

=== Agriculture ===
- Agricultural Economics & Extension
- Crop production
- Animal Production
- Fisheries and Aquaculture
- Soil & Environmental Management
- Food Science & Technology
- Home Science

=== Arts and Humanities ===
- History and International studies
- English and Literary Study
- Theater Art
- Arabic
- Philosophy
- Christian religious studies

=== Law ===
- Common law
- Islamic Law

=== Social Sciences ===
- Mass Communications
- Economics
- Political Science
- Sociology
- Geography and environmental studies

=== Education ===
- Mathematics Education
- Chemistry Education
- Physics Education
- Biology Education
- CRS Education
- Islamic Education
- Library and Information Sciences
- Human Kinetics and Health Education
- Social studies education
- Economics Education
- English Education
- Geography Education

=== Natural Sciences ===
- Mathematical Sciences & Statistics
- Pure and Industrial Chemistry
- Physics
- Plant Science and Biotechnology
- Geology
- Microbiology
- Biochemistry
- Animal and Environmental Biology
- Computer Science

=== Management Science ===
- Accounting
- Banking and Finance
- Public Administration
- Business Administration

=== Health sciences ===
- Human Anatomy
- Human physiology
- Medical laboratory science
- Nursing science
- Pharmacology

Prince Abubakar Audu University commenced academic activities in April, 2000 with six faculties: Faculties of Agriculture, Arts and Humanities, Law, Management Sciences, Natural Sciences and Social Sciences. The university added the establishment of Faculty of Medicine with extensive office and laboratory complexes. The Centre for Pre-Degree and Diploma Studies was established under the present University administration to run diploma and pre-degree programmes. Students of the pre-degree programme could gain admission into the degree programme if they are successful in the internal exams and need not write the Post-UTME exams.

All the faculties and centre for Remedial Studies and Diploma are in one place because the university is planned to be a city of its own. There are no satellite campuses. However there are clamours that the university be decentralised by moving some of its faculties especially College of Medicine to either western or Central part of the state.

The university offers many courses on such topics as medicine, law, microbiology, biochemistry, geology (combined engineering and geosciences), physics, mathematics, computer sciences, public administration, human kinetics, industrial chemistry, statistics, business administration, accounting, banking and finance, theatre arts, food, nutrition and home sciences, agricultural engineering, crop production, animal production, soil science, food science and technology, fishery and forestry, Islamic studies, religion and philosophy, English, history and international studies, sociology, mass communication, economics, and chemistry. 98% of the courses offered in the university are accredited by the Nigeria University Commission (NUC).

Although not very popular, the university is one of the best in Africa, with some of its departments being ranked by Nigerian professional and academic bodies as the best in Nigeria. Some few years ago, the Faculty of law was pronounced as the best in Nigeria, and has remained among the best in subsequent years. Also the department of Geology has been rated as one of the best in Africa, alongside Obafemi Awolowo University, and the University of Ibadan. Presently, it hosts a library which is home to a large collection of expensive specialized books, materials, and a Geologic station, both contributed by Shell Petroleum Development Company as an appreciation of the department's exceptionally-strong intellectual capacity development attitude.

The university also boasts facilities which according to undisclosed sources, are accessible to students for academic research, a privilege very uncommon among other Nigerian universities. Notable is the University's E-library; a large heavily-equipped structure which is stand-alone and separate from the school's main library. Sources have it that there a few other Nigerian universities such as Covenant University (private university) that boast a stand-alone E-library.

Despite inadequate funding which is the major challenge of state owned universities compared to federal universities, KSU has been named the university with the best implementation of resources for development by the Knowledge for Impact Foundation.

== Students ==
The Institution started with a student population of about 751 in 2000, but which as at 2009/2010 admission exercise has grown to about 16,000, and now stands at about 50,000 in 2016. It is also known as one of the fairest universities in its admission exercise, admitting students strictly by merit, and occasionally by near-merit. It has been ranked as Nigeria's fastest developing university, and one of such, in Africa. The university like many others has a functional Student Union Government (SUG). In 2014 however the SUG was suspended due to violence during the elections and was later reinstated in 2016 (it was run by an interim government until then). The next election was a lot more successful and produced Phillip Omepa as the president and Suleiman, Farouq Omale as the Director of Welfare. In 2018 Governor Yahaya Bello was accused of plotting to impose hand picked candidates as the leaders of the students union.

Although not as popular as its federal counterparts like the University of Lagos, Obafemi Awolowo University, and Ahmadu Bello University, Kogi State University has been named by many multinational corporate bodies as one of Africa's BEST universities based on the exceptional intellectual pedigree of its employed graduates. As at January 2017, the university officially dismembered itself from the Academic Staff Union of Universities: the umbrella body for academic staff members of Nigerian universities. As such, academic programs have become stable and fast, without the incessant strike actions characteristic of ASUU-member universities.

== See also ==
- Federal University, Lokoja
