= Mai'tama =

Nigerian given name

Maitama
- Gender: Male
- Language: Yoruba

Origin
- Origin: Nigeria
- Meaning: .
- Region of origin: Northern, Nigeria

Maitama is a Nigerian male given name and surname its common among the Northern Nigerians especially Hausa.

Notable individuals with the name includes:

- Bello Maitama Yusuf (1947–2023), Nigerian politician and businessman
- Maitama Sule (1929–2017), Nigerian politician

Mai'tama may also refer to:

- Yusuf Maitama Sule University, Kano, a Nigerian public university owned by the Kano State Government
