= Abubakar Adamu Rasheed =

Nigerian academic

Executive Secretary National Universities Commission
- Incumbent
- Assumed office 2016
- Preceded by: Julius Okojie

Vice-chancellor Bayero University Kano
- In office 2010–2015
- Preceded by: Attahiru Muhammad Jega
- Succeeded by: Muhammad Yahuza Bello

Personal details
- Born: January 22, 1959 (age 67) Kano State, Nigeria
- Education: University of Nottingham; Ahmadu Bello University, Zaria; Bayero University Kano
- Profession: Professor

Abubakar Adamu Rasheed, MFR is a Nigerian academic, administrator, Professor of English and the 9th vice-chancellor of Bayero University, Kano.

== Education ==
Rasheed obtained his bachelor's degree in art from Bayero University Kano, Masters in Art from the University of Nottingham and PhD from Ahmadu Bello University.

== Career ==
Rasheed became the vice chancellor of Bayero University in 2010, a position he held till 2015. In 2016, Rasheed was appointed executive secretary of National Universities Commission (NUC). On 26 June 2023 he resigned as the NUC boss and he continued his job as a lecturer at Bayero University Kano state, where he already became their vice chancellor from 2010 to 2015.

And the university honored him, on his welcome back party at the university event with a grand reception.

== Honours ==
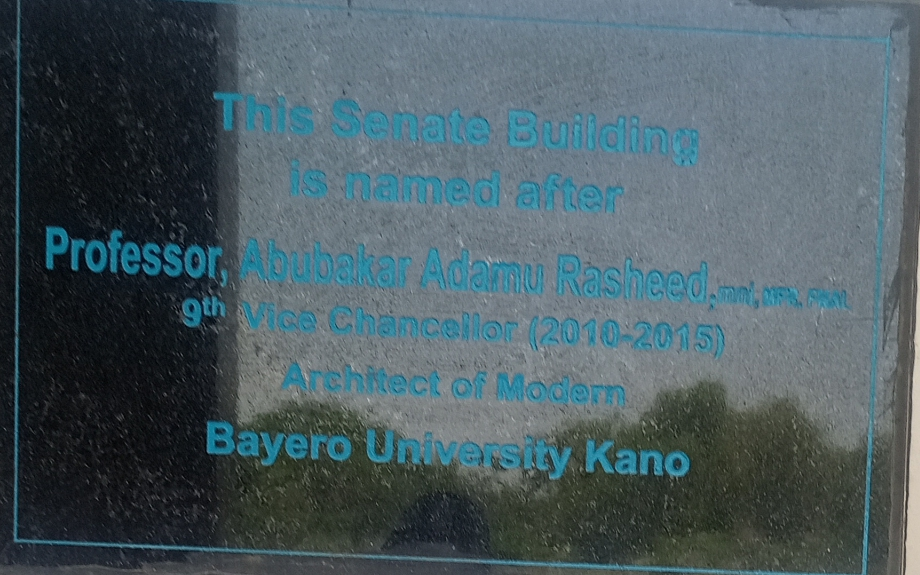
Professor Abubakar Adamu Rasheed Senate Building Bayero University Kano State

In other ways to commemorate the professor's good work towards the development of the university during his tenure, a big senate building was named after him, which is the Professor Abubakar Adamu Rasheed Senate building that is located at the university.

On 17 January Professor Abubakar Adamu Rasheed was honored by Maryam Abacha American University of Nigeria (MAAUN), Kano with a lecture Twin theatre which is named after him and the lecture Theatre was commissioned by him.
