= Jigawa State College of Education and Legal Studies =

Higher education institution located in Ringim, Jigawa State, Nigeria

Coordinates: 12.1499°N 9.1541°E

Jigawa State College of Education and Legal Studies, Ringim
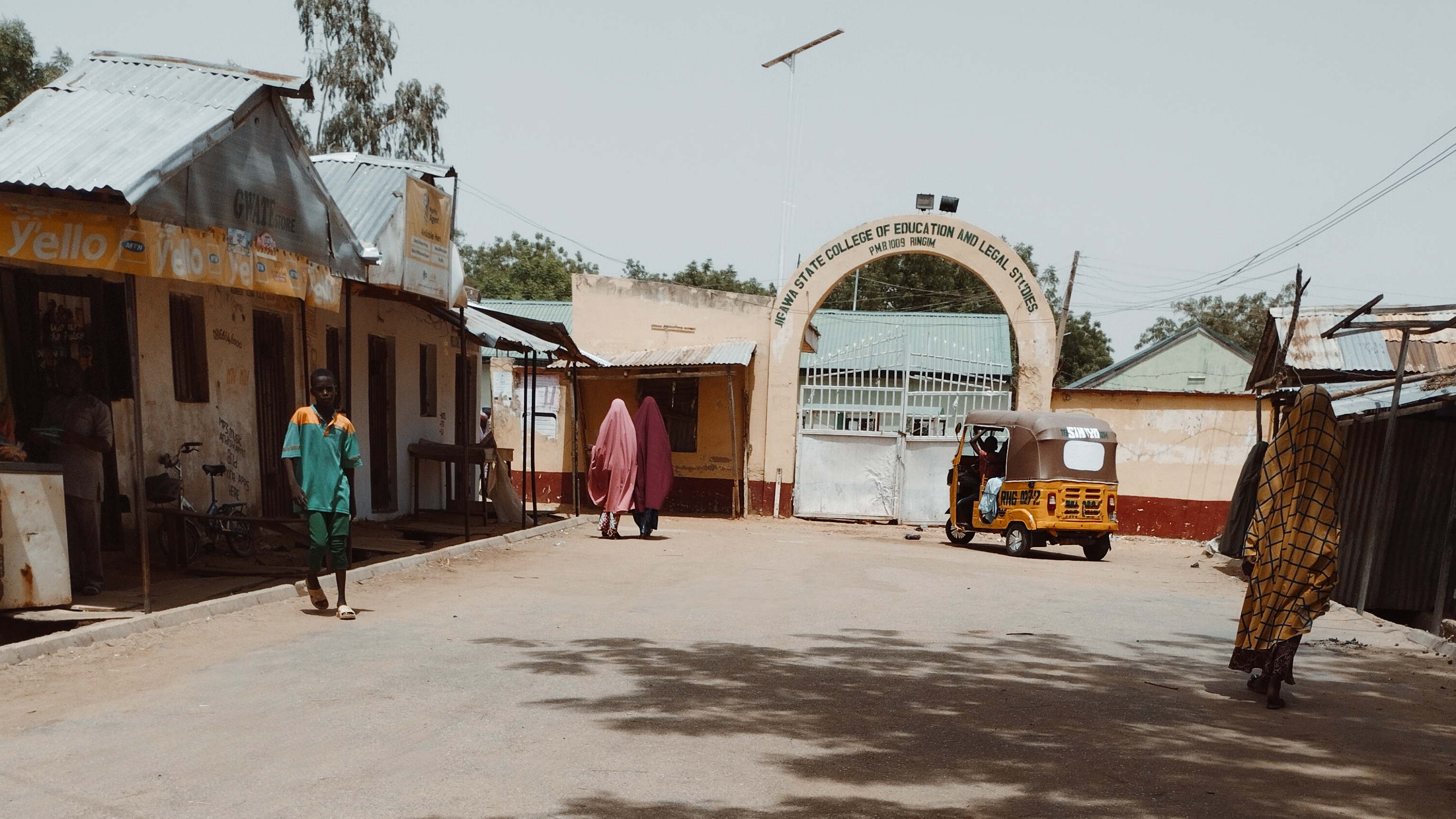
- Motto: Education and Justice
- Type: Public
- Established: 1992
- Affiliations: Usmanu Danfodiyo University Sokoto
- Provost: Dr. Jummai Ali Kazaure
- Location: Ringim, Jigawa State, 720101, Nigeria
- Website: Official website

The Jigawa State College of Education and Legal Studies is a state government Higher Education Institution located in Ringim, Jigawa State, Nigeria. The current Provost is Dr. Jummai Ali Kazaure.

== History ==
The Jigawa State College of Education and Legal Studies Ringim was established in 1992.

== Courses ==
The institution offers the following courses;

Post Graduation Programmes

- Professional Diploma in Education (PED), in Affiliation with Ahmadu Bello University Zaria
- Degree Programmes
- BA. Ed. English
- BA. Ed. Primary Education Studies
- BA. Ed. History
- BA. Ed. Hausa
- BA. Ed. Arabic
- BA. Ed. Islamic Studies
- NCE Programmes
- Arabic / English
- Arabic / Hausa
- Arabic / Islamic Studies
- Arabic Medium
- Early Childhood Care Education (Double Major)
- Economics / English
- Economics / Islamic Studies
- Economics / History
- English / Hausa
- English/ Islamic Studies
- English / Social Studies
- Hausa / History
- Hausa / Islamic Studies
- Hausa / Social Studies
- History / Hausa
- History/ English
- History / Islamic Studies
- History / Social Studies
- Islamic Studies/ Social Studies
- Mathematics / Computer Studies
- Primary Education (Double Major)
- Diploma Programmes
- Diploma in Law
- Diploma Criminology Studies
- Diploma in Shari'ah and Civil Law
- Diploma in Qur'anic Science

== Admission Requirements ==
Aspirants seeking admission to Jigawa State College of Education and Legal Studies, Ringim must have 5 credit pass in West africa examination council (WAEC), National Examination Council (NECO) and must have the Equivalent cut of 150 mark in joint Admission matriculation Board Examination Jamb for Undergraduate Programmes and 100 marks for NCE Programmes.

== Partnership ==
Jigawa state college partner with Usmanu Danfodiyo University Sokoto and Federal University Dutse, in other to promote research and Foster academy excellency within the both institutions.
