= Mahmud Tukur =

Nigerian politician

- Born: 1939; Yola
- Died: 9 April 2021 (aged 81–82)
- Burial place: Yola
- Education: Doctor of Philosophy in Public Management Master’s Degree in Public International Affairs Bachelor's Degree in International Affairs and Political Science at the University of Wales
- Alma mater: Ahmadu Bello University; University of Pittsburgh; University of Wales
- Relatives: Bamanga Tukur; Hamman Tukur

Mahmud Tukur (1939 - 2021) was a Nigerian politician and former Minister for Commerce and Industry during the military administration of General Muhammadu Buhari. He was the first indigenous Director of the Institute of Administration in Congo, Zaria. He succeeded Professor Sam Scruton Richardson in 1967, until 1975 when he became the first Vice Chancellor of Bayero University, Kano. Tukur's tenure as Vice Chancellor of Bayero University increased his public profile in Northern Nigeria. He became friends with contemporaries such as Mamman Daura, Adamu Ciroma, and Hamza Rafindadi Zayyad, forming a small clique of policy advocates in Northern Nigeria. He died on 9 April 2021, at the age of 82 years.

== Honours ==
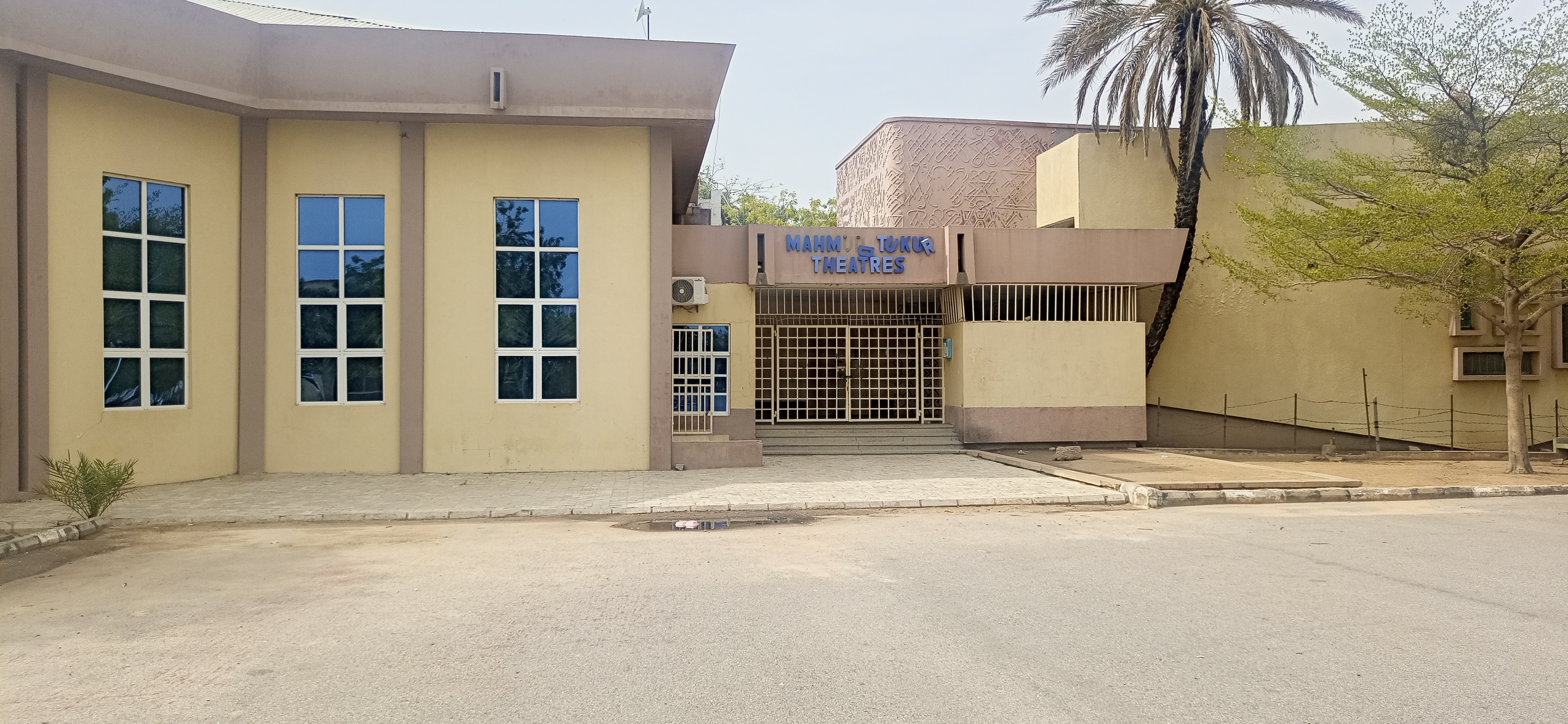
Mahmud Tukur twin theatre Bayero university old campus

Tukur was a Fulbright-Hays Fellow, a senior I.U.C. Fellow and an associate member of St. Anthony's College, Oxford (1974). As a public servant, he served on the Nigeria's Constitution Drafting Committee of 1976. He was also a member of the sub-committee on Citizenship Rights, Fundamental Rights, Political Parties and Electoral System under the chairmanship of Alhaji Aminu Kano. He was a member of the National Constitutional Conference (1994/1995) and the Vision 2010 Committee of 1997.

In his honour, a Twin theatre was named after him, Mahmud Tukur Twin theatre. It is a very large building that is used for educational purposes in the university, in Bayero University old site campus.
