= Sagir Adamu Abbas =

Nigerian academic (born 1962)

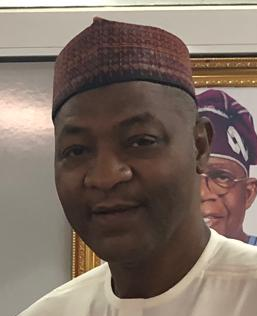
- Sagir Adamu Abbas (2025)

Vice-chancellor Bayero University Kano
- In office 2020–2025
- Preceded by: Muhammad Yahuza Bello
- Succeeded by: Haruna musa

Deputy vice chancellor Bayero University Kano
- In office 2015–2020
- Preceded by: Adamu Idris Tanko
- Succeeded by: Hafiz Abubakar

Personal details
- Born: 22 April 1962 (age 64) Kano State
- Education: Ahmadu Bello University; Bayero University Kano
- Profession: Professor

Sagir Adamu Abbas (born 22 April 1962) is a Nigerian academic who serves as the 11th vice chancellor of Bayero University Kano.

== Early life and education ==
Sagir Adamu Abbas was born on 22 April 1962, in the Yan Katifa, Kantudu Madabo area of Kano Municipal Local Government Area, Kano State, Nigeria. He holds a B.Sc. in mathematics and a M.Ed. in education in mathematics from Bayero University Kano and a Ph.D. in mathematics education from Ahmadu Bello University.

== Career ==
Abbas was a lecturer at Sa'adatu Rimi College of Education before joining Bayero University Kano as a lecturer in 1991. He served in various senior positions at Bayero, included at the office of the head of the Department of Education, as director of the development office, and deputy vice-chancellor.

Abbas assumed the role of the 11th vice-chancellor of Bayero University, Kano in 2020.
