= Emmanuel Osodeke =

Nigerian Professor of soil science

- In office 2021–2025

Formal National President of Academic Staff Union of Universities
- Preceded by: Biodun Ogunyemi
- Succeeded by: Chris Piwuna

Personal details
- Born: Kokori, Delta State
- Party: Non-Partisan
- Spouse: Onome Osodeke

Emmanuel Victor Osodeke is a Nigerian Professor of Soil Science at Michael Okpara University of Agriculture, Umudike, who was also the national president of Academic Staff Union of Universities. He served as vice president of the union in the previous term.

== Early life and education ==
Osodeke was born in Kokori, Ethiope east local government of Delta State. He got his BSc from Rivers State University of Science and Technology in 1987, and a Master of Science from the University of Ibadan in 1989. He got his Postgraduate Diploma in Agro-meteorology from the Israeli Institute of Meteorology in 1994, and in 2002, he got his PhD from Michael Okpara University of Agriculture in Umudike.

== Career ==
Osodeke was a lecturer at Delta State University, Abraka, he was also the chairman of Academic Staff Union of Universities in Michael Okpara University of Agriculture, Umudike. He is a visiting professor at the University of Calabar and University of Cape Coast, Ghana. On 30 May 2021 he was elected national president of the Academic Staff Union of Universities and served until 2025.

== Personal life ==
Osodeke is married to Onome Osodeke and they have four children.
