= Jamilah Tangaza =

Nigerian journalist

- Born: 23 May 1971 (age 55); Kano, Kano State, Nigeria.
- Education: London School of Economics; Bayero University
- Occupations: Journalist and broadcaster
- Employer: BBC
- Website: Official website

Jamilah Tangaza (alternately Jamila Tangaza) is a Nigerian journalist and technocrat. She is a former BBC journalist, where she worked in various capacities before becoming Head of Hausa Service. Tangaza is a Fellow of Reuters Institute for the Study of Journalism, University of Oxford and member of Chartered Management Institute of the United Kingdom

== Early life ==
Tangaza was born in Kano, Northern Nigeria. She was appointed the Head of Abuja Information Management Systems, AGIS in 2013.

== Journalism career ==
Tangaza started working with the BBC World Service as a producer in 1992 where she worked in production various programmes for the BBC Hausa Service. She became Senior producer in 1994, a position which entails overseeing production and reporters' output from the West African region. She worked with other BBC departments both in presenting and producing programmes such as Outlook as well as those focusing on Africa including Focus on Africa and Network Africa.

Two years after establishing BBC Abuja office in 2004, Tangaza was deployed to Nigeria and appointed the BBC's Abuja editor, tasked with planning and co-ordinating BBC's coverage from Nigeria. She became acting Head of BBC Hausa responsible for overseeing the Service's daily output as well as coordinating activities both in London and Abuja.
