= Munzali Jibril =

Munzali Jibril is a Nigerian emeritus professor of English, and the former Executive Secretary of the National University Commission. He is also a former Deputy Vice-Chancellor of Bayero University, Kano State, Nigeria. He was the coordinator of the Nigeria Police Academy in Wudil. He was appointed in 2010 by Nigerian President Goodluck Jonathan. He is currently the Pro-chancellor of Federal University Lafia.

Jibril was also the 20th President and Chairman of Council for the Nigerian Institute of Management. He had his Bachelor's, Masters and doctorate degree in art from Ahmadu Bello University, University of Leeds and University of Lancaster respectively. He is considered an expert in higher education. He was the Academic Provost of Nigerian Defence Academy, Kaduna.
