= Northwest University, Kano =

Kano State Government-owned university

Coordinates: 12.0042°N 8.4833°E

Northwest University (formerly, Yusuf Maitama Sule University, Kano)
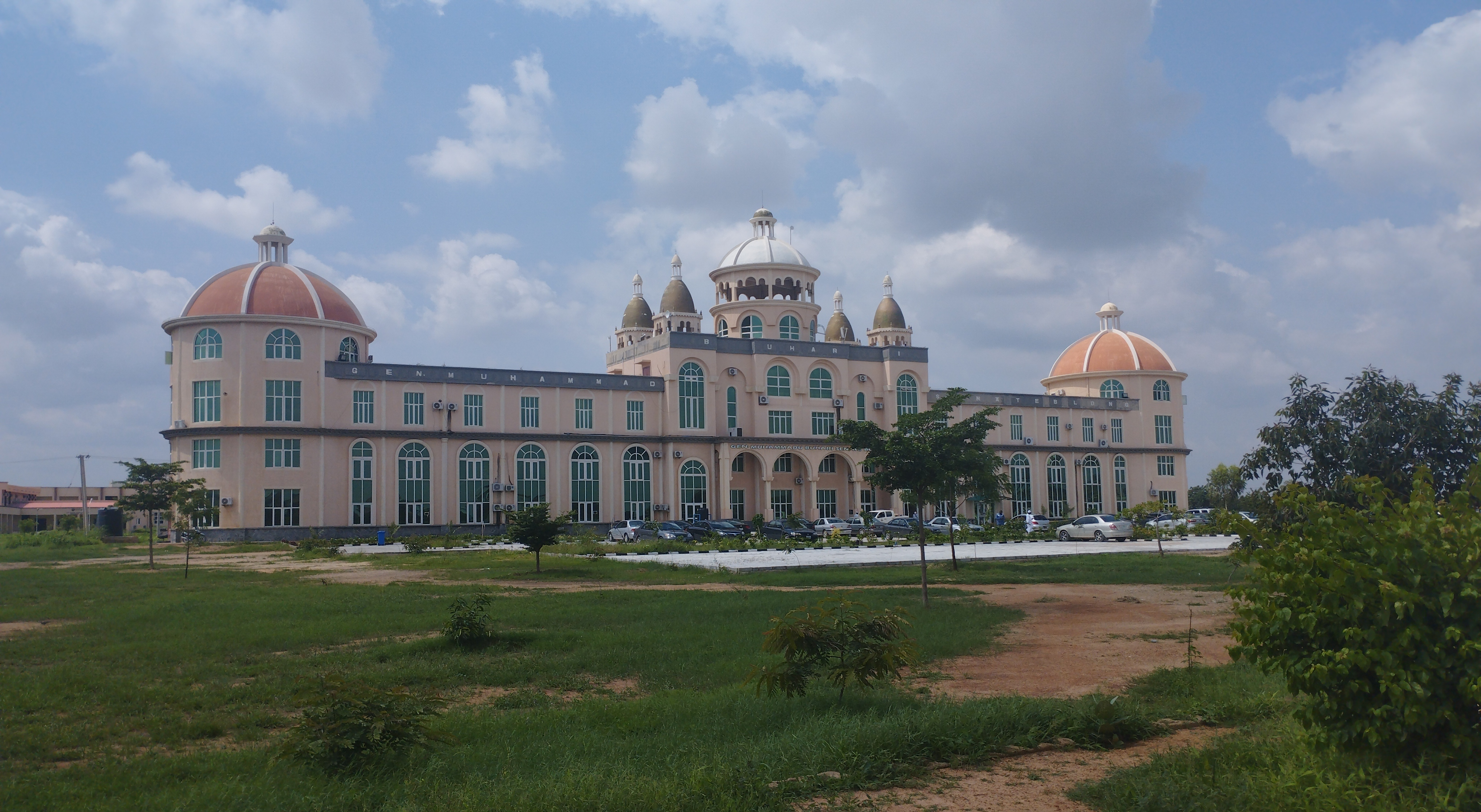
- Other name: NWU
- Former names: Northwest University Kano, Yusuf Maitama Sule University, Kano
- Motto: Knowledge for self reliance and development
- Motto in English: Knowledge for self reliance and development
- Type: Public
- Established: 2012
- Academic affiliations: NUC, ASUU
- Officer in charge: Isyaku Adamu
- Chairman: J. D. Amin
- Chancellor: His Royal Highness Eze, CON
- Vice-Chancellor: Amina Salihi Bayero
- Dean: 7
- Academic staff: 500
- Administrative staff: 2000
- Undergraduates: 17567
- Location: Kano, Kano State, Nigeria
- Campus: Urban
- Colors: Brown, green, red
- Website: nwu.edu.ng/web/

Northwest University (formerly Yusuf Maitama Sule University, Kano) is a Nigerian public university owned by the Kano State Government. It has two campuses: City Campus located in Kano City, and the main campus located along General Buhari Way, Kofar Ruwa.

In 2017, the university initially renamed Yusuf Maitama Sule University as a tribute to Maitama Sule, the influential 20th-century Kano politician, was later renamed back to its original name, Northwest University, Kano.

== History ==
Kano State Governor Rabiu Kwankwaso set up a technical committee to establish the second Public University in Kano State, after the Kano University of Science and Technology.

The committee included Hafiz Abubakar, Muhammad Yahuza Bello, Fatima Batul Mukhtar, Bayero University Kano and Umar Garba. The committee submitted their report to Kwankwaso, who submitted it to the Kano State House of Assembly for their approval. After they passed the bill, the National Universities Commission was contacted for final approval.

Kwankwaso immediately inaugurated an Implementation Committee, which was headed by Professor Hafiz Abubakar. Their task included the appointment of both academic and non-academic staff, and the admission of the original students..

== Library ==
The library was established in 2012, it has now grown in size and services to its present state, the library is a department of the university headed by a university librarian. The library provides resources to support learning, teaching, and research to its community. The library provides access to online and offline resources through academic database.
