= Muhammadu Sani Zaharadeen =

Nigerian academics and religious leader

- Born: 1940 (age 85–86); Kano State
- Citizenship: Nigeria
- Education: McGill University
- Occupations: Academician, Religious Leader
- Title: Grand Imam of Kano state
- Predecessor: Prof. Dandatti Abdulkadir (1986-91)
- Successor: Prof. B.B. Dambatta (1995-99)

Muhammadu Sani Zaharadeen, OFR (born 22 June 1940) is a Nigerian Islamic scholar, academic administrator, and religious leader. He served as the Vice-Chancellor of Bayero University, Kano (BUK) and later as the Grand Imam of the Kano Emirate. He is known as one of Nigeria's scholars in Arabic and Islamic studies.

== Early life and education ==
Muhammadu Sani Zaharadeen was born in Kano State, Nigeria. He began his early education in traditional Qur'anic schools. He attended Rumfa College, Kano, from 1953 to 1960. Following his secondary education, he enrolled at the School of Arabic Studies (SAS) in Kano from 1961 to 1963, focusing on Arabic, Islamic Studies, History, and English Literature. He pursued further higher education internationally, obtaining advanced degrees, including a Master of Arts (MA) and a Doctor of Philosophy (PhD) in Islamic Studies from McGill University in Canada.

== Career ==
He was the deputy vice chancellor of Bayero University Kano from 1982 to 1986. And was appointed as the 5th vice chancellor from 1990 to 1995. He also served as a member of the Federal Government's Political Bureau (1985–1986) under the Babangida administration.

He was appointed as the Grand Imam of the Kano Emirate in Northern Nigeria. He was conferred the National honour of Officer of the Order of the Federal Republic (OFR).
