= Zuwaira Gambo =

Commissioner for Women Affairs and Social Development, Borno State

Hajiya Zuwaira Gambo

Borno State Commissioner for Women Affairs and Social Development, Borno State
- Incumbent
- Assumed office July 2019
- Governor: Babagana Umara Zulum

Personal details
- Born: Zuwaira Gambo Kwaya Kusar, Borno State, Nigeria
- Party: All Progressive Congress (APC)
- Education: Bayero University, Federal Government College (Benin)
- Occupation: Politician
- Profession: Politics, Philanthropy, Women Rights Activism, Child's Rights Activism

Zuwaira Gambo is the Commissioner for Women Affairs and Social Development, Borno State.

== Early life and education ==
She was born in a town called Kwaya Kusar in Borno State where she obtain her primary education, then to Federal Government Girls College, Benin, then to Bayero University Kano for her first Degree in Mass communication, and a second degree in public administration from University of Calabar.

== Career ==
She works with the Department of Federal University of Technology, Minna as Editor, then with Daily Times Group as a writer and Editor, she was made Secretary of defence appointed by previous Inspector General of Police Alhaji Ibrahim Coomassie.
