= Mohammed Mabdul =

Nigerian politician (born 1961)

- Born: 10 October 1961 (age 65)
- Education: Bayero University Kano
- Occupation: Ambassador

Mohammed Abdullahi Mabdul (born 10 October 1961) is a Nigerian diplomat who served as the ambassador of Nigeria to Algeria from 2019 to 2022. Mabdul studied Arabic and political science at Bayero University Kano and joined Nigeria Foreign Service in 1987, where he served in Nigerian missions abroad and within the country.

== Biography ==
Mabdul was born in Markudi, Benue state of Nigeria on 10 October 1961 and holds a B.A in Arabic and political science from Bayero University, Kano. He joined Nigeria Foreign Service in 1987 and has been a diplomat within the territories of Nigeria and outside.

Mabdul served as the Counsellor in Charge of Consular/Visa at the Embassy in Algiers from 1995 for three (3) years, and Chief Protocol Officer, office of the Vice President of Nigeria for six years starting from 1999. He also served as the deputy director and acting director of Protocol, office of the Vice President from 2005 to 2007, Director of Research in the Ministry from 2011 till 2014 and Consul in Nigerian Consulate, Jeddah, Saudi Arabia from 2015- 2018. In 2019, he was appointed Nigeria Ambassador to Algeria and left the position in 2022.
