= Moses Ochonu =

Nigerian academic

Moses Ebe Ochonu
- Pronunciation: Moses O-to-nu
- Born: Nigeria
- Education: Bayero University Kano, University of Michigan (PhD)
- Occupation: Professor
- Employer: Vanderbilt University

Moses Ebe Ochonu is a Nigerian academic, historian, author and professor of African History at Vanderbilt University, Nashville, Tennessee. He has been the Cornelius Vanderbilt Chair in History since 2017.

== Early life ==
Ochonu was born in Benue State, and he attended Bayero University Kano graduating with B.A. History in 1997. He received his Ph.D. from the University of Michigan, Ann Arbor, Michigan. He was twice a fellow of the American Council of Learned Societies ACLS. His research has also received support from the Harry Frank Guggenheim Foundation, the British Library, the National Endowment for the Humanities (NEH), the Ford Foundation and the American Historical Association.

== Published work ==
=== Books ===
- Colonial Meltdown: Northern Nigeria in the Great Depression, (Ohio University Press, 2009)
- Colonialism by Proxy: Hausa Imperial Agents and Middle Belt Consciousness in Nigeria, (Indiana University Press, 2014)
- Africa in Fragments: Essays on Nigeria, Africa, and Global Africanity, (New York Diasporic Africa Press, 2014)
- Emirs in London: Subaltern Travel and Nigeria's Modernity, (Indiana University Press, 2022)
- Boko Haram: The Past of the Present Upheaval (University of California Press, 2026)

=== Book reviews ===
- Wale Adebanwi, Yoruba Elites and Ethnic Politics in Nigeria: Obafemi Awolowo and Corporate Agency (Cambridge University Press, 2014)
- Andrew Barnes, Making Headway: The Introduction of Western Civilization in Colonial Northern Nigeria, (University of Rochester Press, 2009)
- Toyin Falola and Ann Genova, Historical Dictionary of Nigeria, by Toyin Falola and Ann Genova (Scarecrow Press, 2009)
- Alvin O. Thompson, Economic Parasitism: European Rule in West Africa 1880-1960, (The University of the West Indies, 2006)
