= Congress of Nigerian University Academics =

Education trade union

- Abbreviation: CONUA
- Formation: October 4, 2022; 4 years ago
- Headquarters: Osun State
- Location: Nigeria
- Members: Congress of Nigerian University Academics
- Official language: English
- Leader: Niyi Sunmonu

Congress of Nigerian University Academics (CONUA) is a secession of Academic Staff Union of Universities. The union is led by Niyi Sunmonu from Obafemi Awolowo University. It was established in 2018 and was not certified until October 2022 by the Minister of Labour and Employment Senator Chris Ngige following the failure of the Federal Government of Nigeria and Academic Staff Union of Universities to reach a conclusion that can put an end to the thirty three weeks labour strike that started in February 2022

== Founding Members ==
The founding members of CONUA are from five universities which are;

- Obafemi Awolowo University (OAU),
- Ambrose Alli University (AAU), Ekpoma
- Federal University, Oye Ekiti (FUOYE);
- Federal University, Lokoja (FUL) and
- Kwara State University (KWASU), Molete
