= Rabia Salihu Sa'id =

Nigerian physicist and academic (born 1963)

- Born: Rabia Salihu Sa'id; 21 April 1963 (age 63); Wangara, Gezawa, Kano State, Nigeria
- Education: Bayero University Kano; University of Reading
- Occupations: Professor and researcher of atmospheric and space-weather physics
- Years active: 1999–present
- Employer: Bayero University Kano

Rabia Salihu Sa'id (Note: Her surname is also spelled Said, Sai'id, and Saeed.) (born on 21 April 1963) is a Nigerian physicist, professor of atmospheric and space-weather physics, and a researcher at Bayero University Kano. She conducts research in atmospheric and space weather physics, particle physics, and electronics. Sa'id is an advocate and mentor for young women in science with the Visiola Foundation and Peace Corps; she co-founded Nigeria's Association of Women Physicists. She is an advocate and mentor of Science, technology, engineering, and mathematics (STEM) education and is a facilitator for the British Council's Active Citizens' Programme.

Sai'd has received fellowships from Institute of Applied Physics in Bern, Switzerland and the Ford Foundation and made a fellow of African Scientific Institute (ASI). In 2015, she received an Elsevier Foundation Award for Women Scientists in the Developing World. She was also recognised in 2015 by the British Council for her community work, and by the BBC as part of their 100 Women series.

== Personal life ==
Rabia Sa'id was born in the year 1963 in Wangara, a town in Gezawa local government area of Kano State, Northern Nigeria, where girls have few education opportunities, many marry in their teens, and women are expected to stay at home. (Note: According to the Organisation for Economic Co-operation and Development, Nigeria ranks very low in its treatment of women. The government, though, is working to improve opportunities for women.) Her father, however, wanted her to become a doctor. He was an officer in the Nigerian Army who had two wives and fathered ten children.

Sa'id attended an Army school at the top of her class. She chose to marry at the age of 18, once she graduated from a secondary school. She is a mother of six. Two of her children needed medical care (one of them was born with club foot and another with sickle-cell anemia), which added to her personal challenge to obtain higher education degrees.

== Career ==
=== Education and early career ===
Sa'id began her university education at the age of 29 and ran a nursery school to pay for her education. She holds Bachelor of Science, Masters of Science and Ph.D degrees in Physics from Bayero University Kano. (Note: UNESCO finds that about 24% of doctoral students in the science fields are women. In 2013, Sa'id co-authored a report that found that 5–20% of Nigerian university students enrolled in physics were women. Women are about 14% of the Nigerian academics.) In September 1999, she commenced work as a Graduate Assistant at Bayero University. In 2002, on the International Fellowships Program (IFP) of the Ford Foundation, she studied for an M.Sc degree in Environment and Development from the University of Reading, United Kingdom.

=== Educator ===
She began working in 1999 for the Bayero University and is now a professor of undergraduate and graduate level courses in atmospheric and space-weather physics. (Note: In April 2012, militants of the Islamist group Boko Haram killed 16 people and wounded many more at a church on the university campus, as part of a campaign to eliminate Western education and establish an Islamic State. Sa'id knew two of the people who died that day; She was home with her children. Security has been built up at the university since the attack.) By 2015, she was Deputy Dean at the Student Affairs Division of the university.

=== Research ===
She received a research post at the university, where she conducts research in atmospheric and space weather physics, particle physics, and electronics. Her research is conducted to solve Nigerian environmental challenges. To reduce the number of trees cut down for firewood, for instance, one of her study was about use scraps of wood from carpentry projects for briquettes that could be used as a fuel, thereby reducing the rate at which the country's forests are diminished. She also gathers atmospheric data and studies the effects of deforestation and dust aerosols on climate temperatures. Her goal is to encourage greater reliance in Nigeria on renewable energy sources—like wind power, solar energy, and hydropower—that are less harmful to the environment than fossil fuels.

In 2010, she worked with Dr. C. Matzler, a scientist in terrestrial and atmospheric remote sensing, at the Institute of Applied Physics, University of Bern, Switzerland as a visiting research scientist for four months. In January 2013, she was made an African Scientific Institute (ASI) Fellow in Physics, which is an honorary association and think tank of academics, researchers, and business people.

=== STEM outreach ===
Sa'id is active in Science, technology, engineering, and mathematics (STEM) outreach. She is a co-founder of Nigeria's Association of Women Physicists in 2011, which encourages women to become physicists, seeks to improve physics education in schools, and gives prizes to young women. Sa'id also encourages participation of young people by mentoring them in local and national science projects, volunteering for the Peace Corps Nigeria Alumni Foundation and Visiola Foundation. (Note: As part of her STEM outreach work, Sa'id gave the keynote address at the Annual Gala Dinner of the Visiola Foundation on 2 May 2015 in Abuja.) According to Rabia Salihu, she is active in STEM outreach because there is group pressure and obstacles that girls, particularly those in northern Nigeria, must overcome to pursue degrees and careers in these fields. In addition, "more girls in science will mean that the solutions that science provides are not just tailored to the needs of a single gender." (Note: She tells women in northern Nigeria about how she pursued university degrees while a young mother, 10 years out of secondary school, to encourage them to go to college.) In addition, there is greater appreciation for careers where there are practical applications, like banking and medicine.

=== Recognition ===
In 2015 she was a recipient of one of the five Elsevier Foundation Awards for Women Scientists in the Developing World. Presented in partnership with the Organization for Women in Science for the Developing World (OWSD) and The World Academy of Sciences (TWAS), the awards that year were for the physics and mathematics fields, with Sa'id's award in the field of atmospheric physics. She received the award for her work on Nigerian environmental challenges, which was presented on 14 February 2015 at the Annual Meeting of the American Association for the Advancement of Science (AAAS) in San Jose, California. (Note: The award included a prize of $5000 and free attendance at a workshop or conference at the Abdus Salam International Centre for Theoretical Physics (ICTP).)

In August 2015, Sa'id was interviewed by BBC journalist Claudia Hammond for a feature on the BBC World Service, and was featured in the BBC's annual 100 Women series, highlighting her efforts to promote science education in Nigeria. The following year (2016) she was featured in online magazine The Nigerian Academia in a list of distinguished Nigerian women in science.

== Advocate ==
In addition to the mentoring that she does for the Peace Corps and Visiola for STEM outreach, she is a facilitator for the British Council Active Citizens' Programme, who encourages young people to develop efficient and peaceful communication skills for sustainable development in their communities.

She was one of nine people honored as "women advocates and champions" in Nigeria in March 2015 as part of International Women's Day by the British Council and two of its development programmes, the Nigeria Stability and Reconciliation Programme (NSRP) and the Justice for All (J4A) programme. (Note: Champions are "those who have distinguished themselves in works related to peacebuilding, women’s participation in public service and decision making and women in creative enterprise." They are profiled in workshops, radio talk shows, social media, and round table discussions, such as events at Bayero University Kano with its students to discuss women champions and their role in peace building, enterprise, or academia.)
