= Chris Piwuna =

Nigerian Academic

Christopher Piwuna Goson

National President of Academic Staff Union of Universities
- Incumbent
- Assumed office 2025
- Preceded by: Emmanuel Osodeke

Personal details
- Born: Jos, Plateau State, Nigeria.
- Education: University of Jos; University of Malta
- Occupation: Academic

Christopher Piwuna Goson is a Nigerian professor of medicine who currently serves as the 14th national president of the Academic Staff Union of Universities (ASUU). He previously held the position of national vice president of the union. He is a member of International Psychogeriatric Association and a fellow of West African College of Physicians.

== Early life and education ==
Piwuna was born in Jos the capital of Plateau State. He did his undergraduate at the University of Jos, where he studied medicine and graduated in 2000. He obtained his Masters degree from the University of Malta.

== Career ==
Piwuna is currently serving as the dean of student affairs at the University of Jos. He is also a Consultant Psychiatrist at the University of Jos Teaching Hospital (JUTH).
