= Julius Okojie =

Nigerian academician

Prof. Julius Amioba Okojie

Executive Secretary, National Universities Commission
- In office 2006–2016
- Preceded by: Prof. Peter Okebukola
- Succeeded by: Prof. Abubakar Rasheed

Vice-Chancellor, University of Agriculture, Abeokuta
- In office 1996–2001

Vice-Chancellor, Bells University of Technology, Ota

Personal details
- Born: 27 July 1948 (age 78) Nigeria
- Spouse: Erelu Oluremi Okojie
- Education: University of Ibadan, Ibadan; Yale University, USA

Julius Okojie OON (born 27 July 1948) is a Nigerian educational administrator and a professor of Forest Resources Management. He is the former executive secretary of the National Universities Commission (NUC) who served two terms from 2006 to 2016.

== Background and education ==
Okojie was born on 27 July 1948 and had his primary and secondary education at Government Primary School, Uromi, Edo State Annunciation Catholic College, Irrua Edo State and Federal Government College, Warri, Delta State. In 1972, he completed his bachelor's degree in forestry from the University of Ibadan, Ibadan, Oyo State. Okojie then obtained his master's degree in forestry from Yale University, in the United States of America. In 1981, he was awarded a doctorate degree in Forestry Resource Management at the University of Ibadan, Ibadan, Oyo State.

== Career ==
Okojie started his career at Forestry Research Institute, Ibadan as a Research Officer before joining the University of Ibadan as a lecturer in 1978. In 1990, he was appointed as a professor of Forestry Resource Management at the university. Between 1990 and 1994, Okojie was the Dean, College of Environmental Resources Management, University of Agriculture, Abeokuta. He has served as the National Coordinator of the committee of lost crops in Nigeria and is also a member of the Commonwealth Forestry Association. He was then appointed the Vice Chancellor of the Federal University of Agriculture, Abeokuta (1996-2001). In July 2005, Okojie was appointed the pioneer Vice Chancellor of Bells University of Technology, Ota (2005/2006). He was appointed chairman, Committee of Vice-Chancellors of Nigeria Federal University in 2001. He joined the services of NUC in 2002 as a Visiting Professor and chaired the Standing Committee on Private University (SCOPU). He was later appointed the Executive Secretary, National Universities Commission in 2006. He took a bow from active service with the first inaugural valedictory lecture of the Federal University of Agriculture Abeokuta tagged "A Servant is Not Greater Than His Master, Who Wants To Be A Vice-Chancellor?" on Wednesday 25 July 2018 having served as the second substantial Vice Chancellor of the Institution and immediate past two terms Chairman of the Nigerian University Commission.

== Awards ==
Okojie is a recipient of the National Honour of the Officer of the Order of the Niger- OON.

== Personal life ==
Professor Okojie is married to Erelu Oluremi Okojie.
