= Muhammad Yahuza Bello =

Nigerian academic

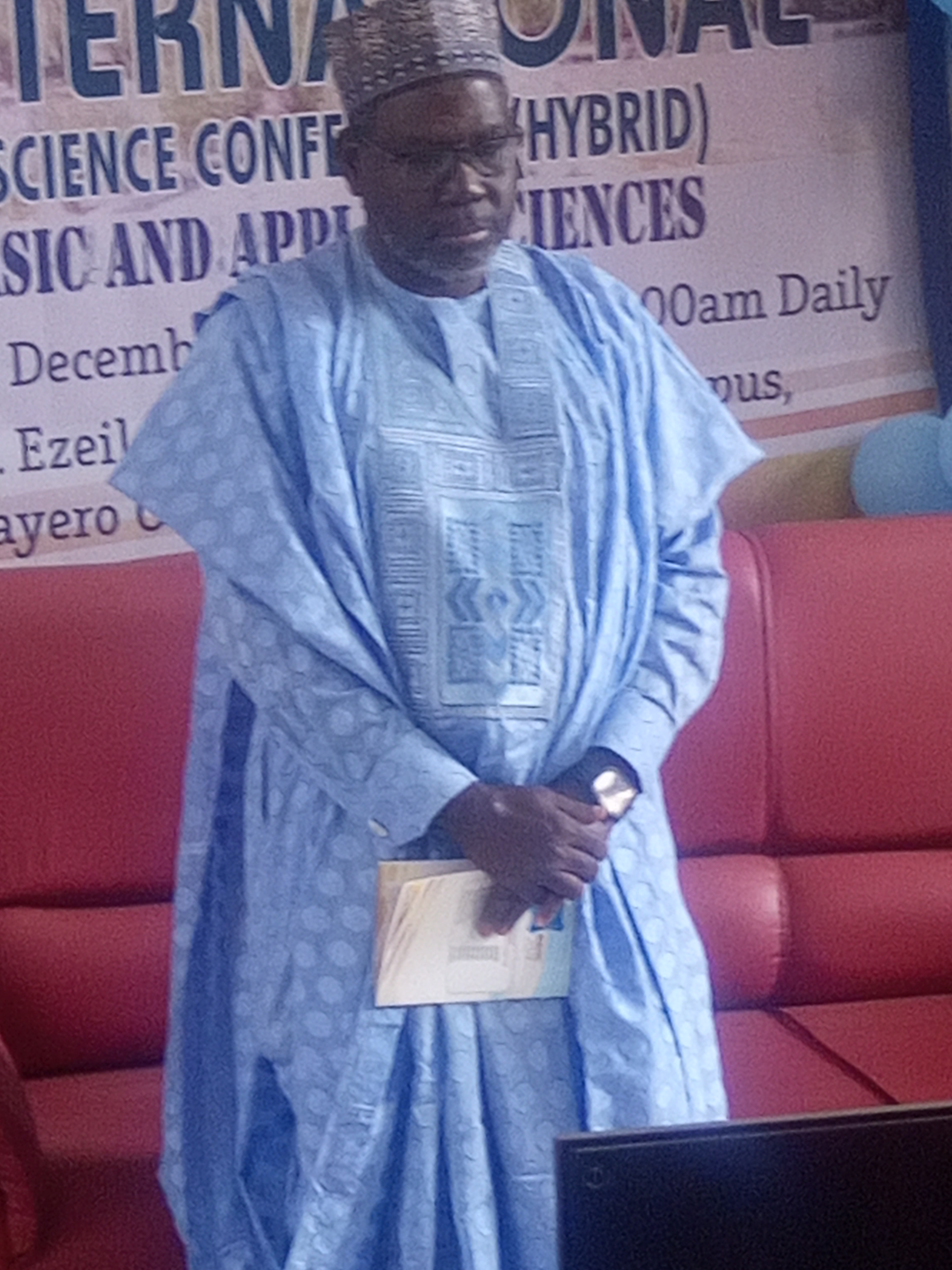
- Picture of prof yahuza Bello

Pro-chancellor Yusuf Maitama Sule University, Kano
- Incumbent
- Assumed office 2020
- Preceded by: Sule Yahaya Hamma

Vice-chancellor Bayero University Kano
- In office 2015–2020
- Preceded by: Abubakar Adamu Rasheed
- Succeeded by: Sagir Adamu Abbas

Personal details
- Born: January 22, 1959 (age 67) Kawo, Nasarawa LGA, Kano State, Nigeria
- Education: University of Arkansas; Bayero University Kano
- Profession: Professor

Muhammad Yahuza Bello is a Nigerian mathematician who served as the 10th vice chancellor of Bayero University Kano.

== Early life and education ==
Yahuza was born on 22 January 1959 in Nassarawa Local Government in Kano state. He attended Giginyu Primary School between 1966 and 1973. He attended Government Secondary School, Gaya where he graduated in 1977, he obtained first and second Degree in Mathematics Education from Bayero University Kano.

Yahuza attended the University of Arkansas, under the supervision of Naoki Kimura where he obtained his third degree in Mathematics between 1985 and 1988.

== Career ==
Yahuza started his career in 1982 as Lecturer in Bayero University Kano, after saving for good 19 years, Yahuza became a professor of Mathematics in 2001.

Yahuza held several administrative positions at Bayero University Kano, which include Head of Mathematical Sciences Department, Sub-Dean, Deputy Dean, and Dean, Faculty of Science, he was also the Dean, School of Postgraduate Studies, Director, Centre for Information Technology; Deputy Vice Chancellor (Academics) Yahuza was elected the 10th Vice chancellor by the University congress and confirmed by the Governing board of the University where he served between 2015 and 2020.

Yahuza has supervised and graduated six PhD Mathematics candidates, 37 MSc Mathematics and MSc Computer Science candidates. He also supervised over 50 BSc Mathematics and BSc Computer Science final year projects. Yahuza is a mathematician who has a passion for computers, which led to the establishment of Computer Science studies in Bayero University Kano, under the department of Mathematics in the year 1990 which now has become the Faculty of Computer Science with more than 1500 graduates.

Yahuza was appointed the Pro-chancellor of Yusuf Maitama Sule University, Kano by the Executive Governor of Kano State Abdullahi Umar Ganduje immediately after the resignation of Alhaji Sule Yahya Hamma in 2020.
