= Abdullahi Yusuf Ribadu =

Nigerian professor (born 1960)

Abdullahi Yusufu Ribadu (born September 2, 1960) is a Nigerian academic and professor of Veterinary Reproduction. He was the Vice-Chancellor of the Federal University of Technology, Yola, Nigeria (from 2004 to 2009). He also served as the pioneer Vice-Chancellor of Sule Lamido University, Kafin Hausa, Jigawa State, Nigeria (from 2013 to 2018). He is currently the Executive Secretary of the National Universities Commission (NUC), Abuja.

== Education ==
Abdullahi had his primary and secondary education in Song and Mubi, respectively, in Adamawa State. He went to Ahmadu Bello University, Zaria, Kaduna State, where he studied Veterinary Medicine. In 1984, he performed the compulsory National Youth Service Corps (NYSC) programme in Ilorin, Kwara State. He studied for his master's degree in Veterinary reproduction (Theriogenology) between 1986 and 1988 at Ahmadu Bello University, Zaria. In 1990, he was awarded a Commonwealth Scholarship to study in the University of Liverpool, where he had his PhD in 1994. He was also awarded a Japanese Society for the Promotion of Science (JSPS) Fellowship for a Postdoctoral Study at Rakuno Gakuen University, Ebetsu, Hokkaido, Japan from 1997 to 1999.

== Career ==
He worked as a lecturer in the University of Maiduguri from 1985 to 2004. In 2004, he became the Vice-Chancellor of Federal University of Technology, Yola. On December 6, 2024, he was appointed as the Executive Secretary of the Nigerian National Universities Commission (NUC) by President Bola Tinubu.

== Recognition ==
Abdullahi had a Commonwealth Scholarship for a PhD degree at the University of Liverpool and also a Japanese post-doctorate fellowship that was sponsored by the Japan Society for the promotion of science. He was the first Nigerian to benefit from that programme.
