= Bello Bako Dambatta =

Nigerian chemist (b. 1950)

- Born: 15 December 1950 (age 75); Kano State
- Education: Kaduna Polytechnic; Trent Polytechnic; University of Bradford; Lancaster University
- Known for: Vice-chancellor of Bayero University, Kano, 1995 – 1999.

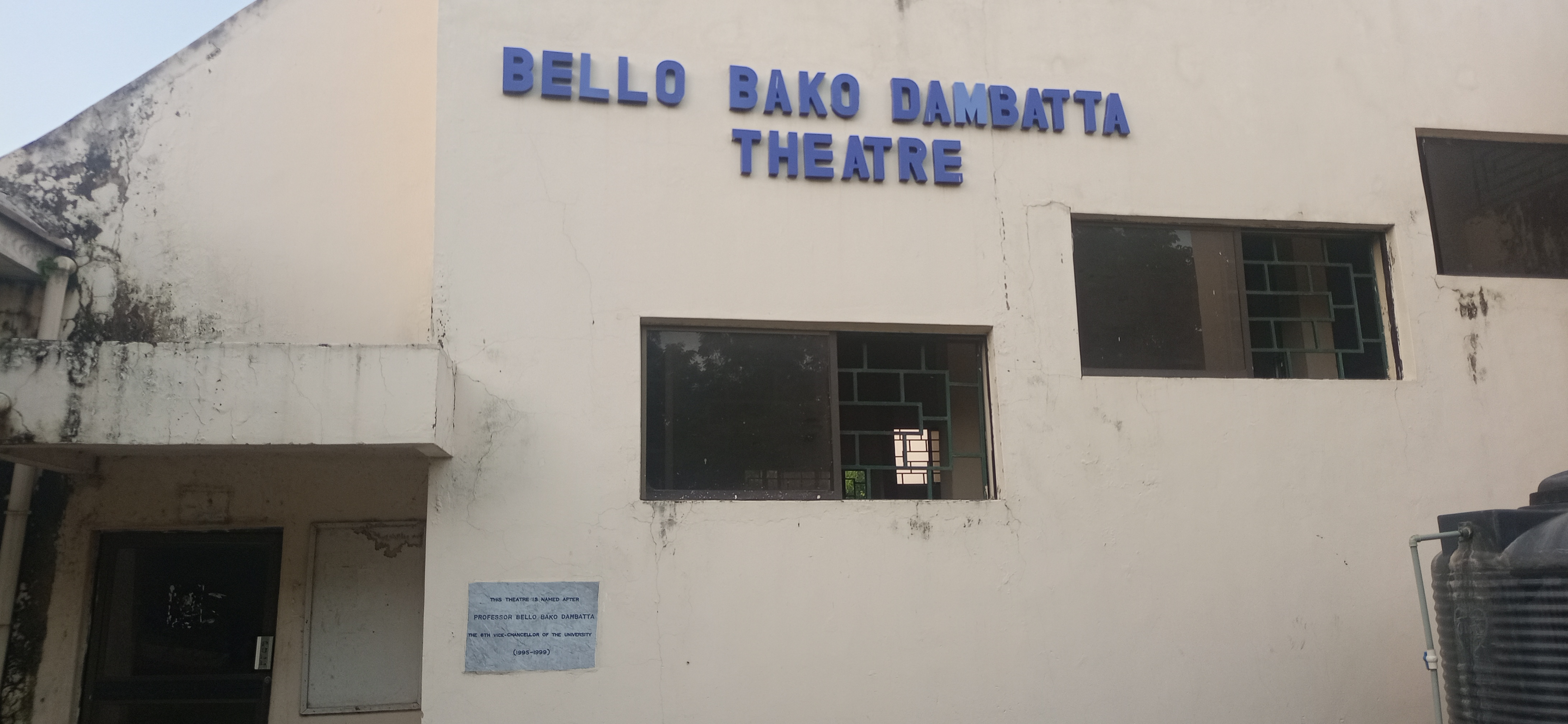
Bello Bakko Dambatta lecture Theatre

Bello Bako Dambatta (born 15 December 1950 in Kano, Kano State, Nigeria) is a Nigerian chemist and university administrator. He served as the vice-chancellor of Bayero University, Kano from 1995 until 1999.

== Education and career ==
Dambatta was born on 15 December 1950 in the city of Kano, Nigeria. He began his higher education at Kaduna Polytechnic (1970–72), then moved to England, where he attended Huddersfield Polytechnic (1972–74), Trent Polytechnic (1974–75), the University of Bradford (1975–76), and Lancaster University (1980-83). He completed his PhD at Lancaster University, with a thesis titled A study of the free-radical polymerisations of tri-n-butyltin methacrylate and i-vinylimidazole.

He was appointed a lecturer at Bayero University, Kano in 1978, and was promoted, reaching full professor in 1994. Bello Bako Dambatta is a Nigerian chemist and academic administrator who served as Vice-Chancellor of Bayero University Kano from 1995 to 1999. Prior to his appointment as Vice-Chancellor, he served as Head of the Department of Chemistry and Dean of the Faculty of Science at the university.

Dambatta became a fellow of the Chemical Society of Nigeria in August 1996.

== Honoured ==
To honour and remember his work, the Bello Bakko Dambatta Lecture Theatre was named after him. It is located at the pharmacy department at the Bayero University Kano old site.
