= Yushau Shuaib =

Nigerian writer (born 1969)

Yushau Abdulhameed Shuaib
- Born: October 10, 1969 (age 57)
- Other name: Yashuaib
- Occupation: Public Relations
- Known for: Public Speaking
- Notable work: An Encounter With the Spymaster

Yushau Abdulhameed Shuaib (born October 10, 1969) is a Nigerian writer. He is an author, public relations practitioner and public affairs commentator on national and international issues, including subjects such as public relations practice, gender equality, national security, youth development, religious tolerance, media arts and crime prevention. He has published over 300 articles in various national dailies in Nigeria.

A graduate of Mass-Communication from Bayero University Kano, he holds a master's degree in Public Relations from the University of Westminster, London. Shuaib has won several awards in public relations practice and writing skills. Yushau Shuaib had worked as a spokesperson for government institutions, including the Federal Ministries of Information, Finance and also Health at various times. He was also Head of Press and Public Relations at the Revenue Mobilisation Allocation and Fiscal Commission (RMAFC) and National Emergency Management Agency (Nigeria) (NEMA).

After writing a controversial article on Nigeria's Finance Minister, Dr. Ngozi Okonjo-Iweala on lopsided appointments into public offices, Shuaib was forced to retire by the government. He is currently a publisher and public relations consultant to critical institutions in Nigeria.

Shuaib is founder and owner of Image Merchants Promotion Limited.
