= Kogi State Polytechnic =

Kogi State Polytechnic was established in 1993, and is located along Lokoja/Abuja Expressway, Lokoja, Kogi State, Nigeria. It is owned and operated by Kogi State Government. As of 2007 it was accredited by the National Board for Technical Education (NBTE) to give certificates in Art and printing, Business, Engineering, Finance and Science Computing at the National Diploma and Higher National Diploma levels. In December 2009 the polytechnic presented 16 programs for accreditation to a visiting team of NBTE officials, mainly for the new schools of Engineering and Environmental Technology, Applied Science and Management Studies. The Rector said the school had to be able to offer core engineering and technology programs in order to fulfill its mandate.

In October 2005 the Kogi state governor, Alhaji Ibrahim Idris approved disbursement of N80 million to the polytechnic. He announced this at the first convocation ceremony, which covered academic sessions from 1992/93 to 2003/2004 and graduated 21,646 students.

In December 2005 a large number of hoodlums disrupted the matriculation ceremony of fresh students, set fire to the rector's office and damaged several vehicles before escaping. The incident may have been related to a struggle over who would succeed the rector, an Igala by tribe. In March 2010 seventy five people, including 18 students of the Polytechnic, were crushed to death by a cement truck that ran out of control. In protest, students barricaded the Lokoja/Abuja highway, set fires and vandalized vehicles. Governor Bello Appointed Dr Salisu Usman Ogbo as the Acting Rector Of Kogi State Polytechnic on 7 April 2020 and confirmed his appointment as the substantive Rector on 11 February 2021 in order to consolidate the achievements he made and bring back the lost glory of the polytechnic.

== See also ==
- List of polytechnics in Nigeria
