= Sonny Echono =

Nigerian diplomat

Arc. Sonny Echono OON

9th Executive Secretary of TETFund
- Incumbent
- Assumed office 18 March 2022
- Nominated by: Board of TETFund
- Appointed by: Muhammad Buhari
- Preceded by: Suleiman Elias Bogoro

28th President of the Nigerian Institute of Architects
- In office 2019–2021
- Preceded by: Amina Mohammed
- Succeeded by: Enyi Ben-Eboh

Permanent Secretary of the Federal Ministry of Education
- In office 2017–2022
- Preceded by: MacJohn Nwaobiala
- Succeeded by: Andrew David Adejoh

Personal details
- Born: Sunday Sylva Togo Echono; 16 December 1962 (age 63)
- Education: St. Mary’s Primary School; St. Theresa’s and St. Murumba’s College,
- Alma mater: University of Calabar; University of Turin; Ahmadu Bello University; Benue State Polytechnic
- Occupation: Architect

Arc.Sunday Sylva Togo Echono OON (born 16 December 1962) is a Nigerian diplomat, and architect who serves as the 9th Executive Secretary of Tertiary Education Trust Fund from 2022 till-date. Previously, Echono served as the Secretary of the Admissions Committee of the Nigerian Institute of Architects and the 28th President of the Nigerian Institute of Architects from 2019 to 2021.

Sonny Echono was nominated by the Board of TETfund in early 2022 and was subsequently appointed as the substantive 9th Executive Secretary (ES) of TETfund on March 18, 2022, by former President Muhammad Buhari.

== Early life ==
Sunday Sylva Togo Echono was born on 16 December 1962 in Otukpo, Benue State. He attended St. Mary’s Primary School in Otukpo for his primary education and St. Theresa’s and St. Murumba’s College in Jos for his secondary education. He joined Murtala College of Arts, Science, and Technology (now. Benue State Polytechnic) in Makurdi for his ‘A’ Levels (JAMB / WAEC), and later pursued a degree in Architecture at Ahmadu Bello University, where he graduated with a BSc. in Architecture in 1983 and an MSc. in 1985.

== Career ==
Echono began his career as an Architect with the Federal Ministry of Works and Housing in 1987, and was elevated in 2005 as the Deputy Director of the ministry. As a civil servant, he served in different ministries including the National Housing Policy as secretary of the Implementation Committee from 1991 to 1994, Member and Secretary of the Special Project Task Force from 1992 to 1993. In 1993, he became acting Chief Executive Architect and joined the Secretary Committee on Lands and Housing, and Assistant to Permanent Secretary from 1994 to 1995. He became Secretary of the Ministerial Tenders Board from 2004 to 2005.

From 2007 to 2008, he serves as the Deputy Director of the Budget Monitoring and Price Intelligence Unit. Echono became Director of Procurement of the Federal Ministry of Defence from 2008 to 2010. In 2010, he served as Director of Procurement of the Federal Ministry of Water Resources till 2011 and served as Director of Procurement of the Federal Ministry of Environment till 2014. In 2014, he served as Director of Procurement of the Federal Ministry of Agriculture and was elevated to the Director of Procurement of the Federal Ministry of Power in the same year. He became the Permanent Secretary of the Federal Ministry of Agriculture from 2014 to 2016.

Echono served as the Permanent Secretary of the Federal Ministry of Communications from 2015 to 2017. In 2017, He was appointed Permanent Secretary of the Federal Ministry of Education, where he served until his retirement in 2022.

=== TETFund appointment ===
On 2 March 2022, he was appointed Executive Secretary of Tertiary Education Trust Fund by the 15th President of Nigeria, Muhammad Buhari. On 4 March 2022, Echono received approval from Tertiary Education Trust Fund as the new executive secretary. on 18 March 2022, he resumed office following the end of Suleiman Elias Bogoro administration. Under his administration, TETFund entered strategic partnerships with notable institutions, including the University of Brazil, for the training of more Nigerian professionals in agriculture, secured transnational cooperation with the government of Britain, Forum for Agricultural Research in Africa, Nigerian Economic Summit Group, African Union in areas of research and collaboration that would aid the growth and development of tertiary education in Nigeria. On 18 July 2023, he appeared before the house of representatives ad hoc committee investigating the alleged abuse of N2.3 trillion tertiary education tax by TETFund. He tells the committee “over 137 scholars sponsored abroad by the fund have absconded”.

== Other activities ==
Other activities include:

- 2015-2017 Chairman, Board of Nigerian Postal Service
- 2014-2015 Member/Chairman of International Institute of Tropical Agriculture
- 2010-2011 Board Member of International Institute of Tropical Agriculture
- 2010-2012 Council Member of National Environmental Standards and Regulations Enforcement Agency

== Honours ==
=== National honours ===
- Nigeria:
  - General administration of the education sector of Nigeria by the Order of the Niger (OON)

Diplomatic posts
Preceded by Suleiman Elias Bogoro	Executive Secretary of TETFund; 2022–present	Incumbent
