= Salisu Usman Ogbo =

Nigerian academic administrator

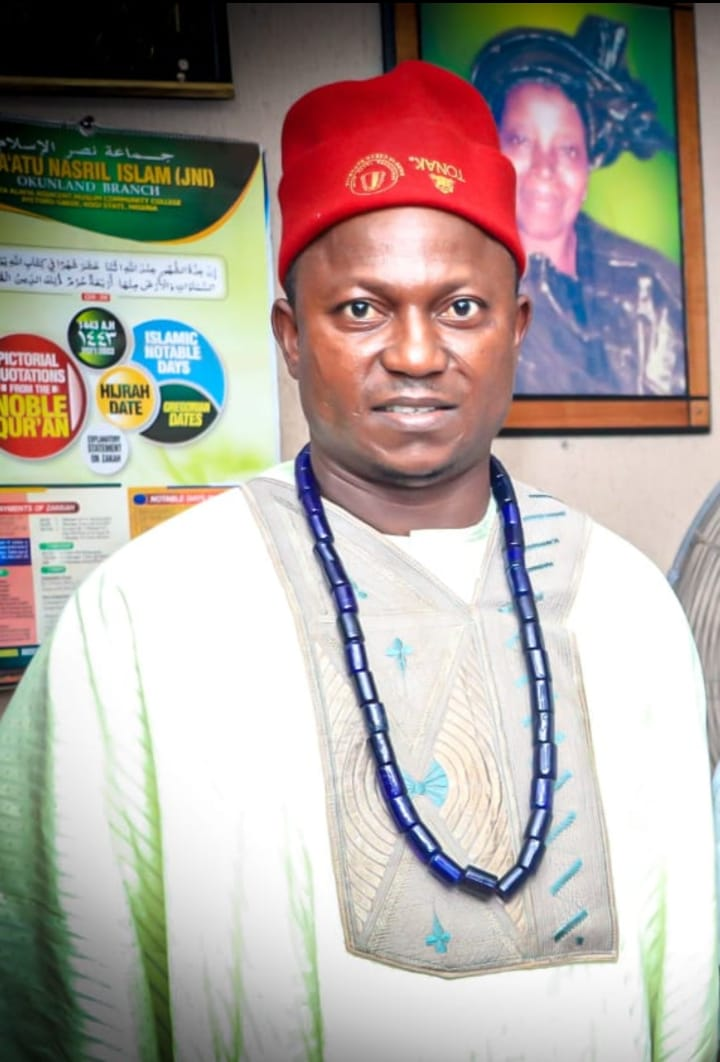
- Born: October 25, 1972 (age 53); Ankpa, Kogi State, Nigeria
- Education: Nasarawa State University (PhD) University of Ilorin (M.Sc) Bayero University Kano (B.Sc)
- Occupation: Academic administrator
- Years active: 2005–present
- Known for: Rector of Kogi State Polytechnic

Salisu Usman Ogbo (born October 25, 1972) is a Nigerian academic administrator and politician. He is the Rector of Kogi State Polytechnic in Lokoja, Nigeria, having been appointed first in an acting capacity in 2020 and confirmed in 2021.

== Early life and education ==
Ogbo was born in Ankpa, Kogi State, Nigeria. He studied at Bayero University Kano, earning a bachelor's degree in Political Science and later a master's degree from University of Ilorin. He also attended Nasarawa State University, Keffi for further postgraduate studies.

== Career ==
Before his appointment as Rector, Ogbo served as a lecturer in the Department of Political Science at Kogi State University. In April 2020, he was appointed acting Rector of Kogi State Polytechnic by the Governor of Kogi State, Yahaya Bello. His appointment was confirmed in February 2021.

Under his leadership, Kogi State Polytechnic has undergone reforms including improvements in infrastructure, accreditation of new programs, and strengthening of academic standards.

== Awards and recognition ==
Ogbo has received several awards for his leadership and contributions to education in Nigeria, including an award for outstanding performance as Rector.

== See also ==
- Kogi State Polytechnic
