= Jumai Bello =

Nigerian media executive

Hajia Jumai Bello
- Born: 1941 (age 84–85)
- Education: Mass Communication at Bayero University

Hajia Jumai Bello is a Nigerian media executive. She was the first female radio executive at Bauchi's Radio Corporation. She served as the first female Managing Director of Bauchi Radio Corporation. She was approved by the former governor, Mohammed Abubakar of Bauchi State. Prior to her appointment as the MD (managing director) of the corporation, she worked as the Director of News and Current Affairs. In 1982, she graduated from Bayero University, Kano, where she studied mass communication.
