= Tertiary Education Trust Fund =

Nigerian government administrative agency

Educational Agency overview
- Formed: 2011
- Jurisdiction: Federal government of Nigeria
- Headquarters: 6 Zambezi Crescent, Off Aguiyi Ironsi Street, Maitama, Abuja, FCT, Nigeria
- Ministers responsible: Tahir Mamman, Minister of Education of Nigeria; Sonny Echono, Executive Secretary
- Parent department: Federal Ministry of Education (Nigeria)
- Website: https://tetfund.gov.ng/

The Tertiary Education Trust Fund (TETFund), is a scheme established by the Federal Government of Nigeria in 2011 to disburse, manage, and monitor the funding of government-owned tertiary education in Nigeria.

Before the establishment of the scheme, public tertiary education had become ineffective as a result of poor funding. The scheme was designed to improve the sector.

== Background ==
From the 1980's, the quality of all tiers of education in Nigeria greatly declined. In December 1990 the Federal Government under the administration of President Ibrahim Babangida constituted the Commission on the Review of Higher Education in Nigeria (the Gray Longe Commission) to review post-independence Nigerian Higher Education after Lord Ashby's Commission of 1959.

The Longe Commission recommended the funding of higher education through an earmarked tax to be paid by companies operating in Nigeria. An implementation committee under the chairmanship of Professor Olu O. Akinkugbe was constituted to implement the report's recommendations and an agreement was signed between the Federal Government and ASUU on 3 September 1992 on funding of universities. In January 1993, the Education Tax Act No7 of 1993 was passed alongside other education-related decrees. The Act imposed a 2% tax on the profits of all companies in Nigeria. The resulting Education Trust Fund (ETF) operated at federal, state and local levels.

== Establishment of the Tertiary Education Fund ==
In May 2011 the Education Tax Act was repealed and replaced by the Tertiary Education Trust Fund Act, due to challenges in operating the ETF. These issues included:

- The ETF was overburdened and could only render palliative support.
- Duplication of functions and mandates of other Agencies set up after the ETF, such as Universal Basic Education (UBE) and Millennium Development Goals (MDGs).

The Tertiary Education Trust Fund (TETF) is also taken as a 2% tax paid from the assessable profit of companies registered in Nigeria. The Federal Inland Revenue Services (FIRS) assesses and collects the tax on behalf of the Fund. The funds are then disbursed for the general improvement of education in federal and state tertiary education for the provision or maintenance of:

- Essential physical infrastructure for teaching and learning;
- Institutional material and equipment;
- Research and publications;
- Academic staff training and development, and;
- Any other need which, in the opinion of the Board of Trustees, is critical and essential for the improvement and maintenance of standards in higher educational institutions.

The fund is managed by an eleven-member board with members drawn from the six geopolitical zones of the country as well as representative of the Federal Ministry of Education, Federal Ministry of Finance and the Federal Inland Revenue Services. The board has the following responsibilities as stated in the Act:

- Monitoring and ensuring collection of Tax by the Federal Inland Revenue Services and ensure transfer to the Fund;
- Manage and disburse the Tax;
- Liaise with appropriate ministries and bodies responsible for the collection or safekeeping of the Tax;
- Receive, request, and approve projects after due consideration;
- Ensure disbursement to various public tertiary education institutions in Nigeria;
- Monitor and evaluate the execution of projects;
- Invest funds in appropriate and safe securities;
- Update the Federal Government on its activities and progress through annual audited reports;
- Review progress and suggest improvement within the provisions of the Act;
- Do such other things that are necessary or incidental to the objective of the Fund under these Acts or as may be assigned by the Federal Government;
- Make any issue guidelines, from time to time, to all beneficiaries on disbursement of monies from the Fund on the use of monies received from the Fund;
- Generally to regulate the administration, application and disbursement of monies from the Fund under the Act.

The distribution is on the ratio of 2:1:1 as between Universities, Polytechnics and the College of Education. The trustees also have the power to give due consideration to the peculiarities of each geo-political zone in the disbursement.

== Criticism and challenges ==
In 2017, the board of trustees criticised federal and state tertiary institutions for not producing the necessary documentation to access the fund, N100bn of which had been unallocated due to this.

== See also ==
- Education in Nigeria
- Federal Ministry of Education (Nigeria)
