= National Universities Commission =

Government commission for higher education in Nigeria

The National Universities Commission (NUC) is a Nigerian government agency set up to regulate higher education in Nigeria.

NUC, as it is popularly called, was established in 1962 as an advisory agency in the cabinet office. In 1974, it became a statutory body and its first executive secretary was professor Jibril Aminu. NUC is currently part of the Federal Ministry of Education and is a parastatal (government-owned corporation).

The commission has a governing council, currently headed by professor Shehu Galadanchi and its executive secretary is Abubakar Adamu Rasheed, who assumed office on 3 August 2016. Since its establishment, the commission has transformed from a small office in the cabinet office to an important arm of government in the area of development and management of university education in Nigeria.

== History ==
The NUC came into being as one of the recommendations of the Ashby Commission which also recommended the creation of new federal universities. NUC initially operated as a supervisory body in the development of university education in Nigeria. At inception, NUC was created by executive action and was initially placed under the Cabinet's Office. The pioneer chairman was the Emir of Yauri, Alhaji Tukur who was succeeded by Rotimi Williams. During the early period of operation, performing the objectives of the organization was hampered by the legal structure of its foundation, as NUC was a non-statutory body within the Cabinet's Office while university education during the First Republic was within the concurrent list. After the military came to power in 1966, NUC was empowered to conduct coordination activities within the federal university system. In 1974, a new legislation restructured NUC to become fully a statutory body headed by an Executive Secretary.

Under Jubril Aminu as secretary, NUC established an overseas office to coordinate recruitment of staff for newly established universities. Between 1975 and 1998, NUC's involvement in the administration of universities gradually grew, it became influential in the appointment of Vice-Chancellors, members of university governing councils and managed the establishment of new faculties and course offerings. In 1985, it was saddled with additional responsibilities to set minimum academic standards and inspect and vet course offerings in universities. In 1999, a new democratic government granted some autonomy to universities governing councils.

=== Key objectives ===
- Advice executive on the financial needs of universities.
- Coordinate the development of universities in Nigeria.
- Allocate and disburse federal grants and external aids to universities.
- Research and advice executive on topics relating to higher education development in Nigeria.
- Advice executive on the creation of degree-granting institutions.
- Advice government on the creation of faculties within Nigerian universities

== Administration ==
Executive secretaries
Name	Tenure
Okoi Arikpo	1962–1969
Jubril Aminu	1975–1979
Abel Guobadia (acting)	1979–1981
Yahaya Aliyu	1981–1986
Idris Abdulkadir	1986–1996
Munzali Jibril	1996–1999
Peter Okebukola	1999–2006
Julius Okojie	2006–2016
Abubakar Rasheed	2016–2023
Chris Maiyaki (acting)	2023-2024
Abdullahi Ribadu	2024-

== Activities ==
In 2002, NUC conducted an accreditation and quality survey and ranking of state and federal universities. The organization has established an electronic network to link research activities within universities to one another.

On 3 February 2021 the Nigerian Universities Commission approved additional 20 Private Universities which has now made 99 approved Private Universities in Nigeria, which also included Mewar International University promoted by Adhyay International, making it first Indian University to expand its campus to Nigeria in the Nasarawa State.

In 2022, the NUC provided provisional licenses to 12 new universities in Gombe State, Borno State, Delta State, Kano State, Sokoto State, Abia State, Anambra State, Niger State, Sokoto State and FCT, Abuja.

In 2023, the NUC Executive Secretary, Professor Abubakar Rasheed said that Nigeria now has 147 private universities.

As of March 2025 the NUC weekly Bulleting reports that the Nigerian University System comprises a total 283 Universities. These institutions are categorized as follows:

- Federal Universities: 69
- State Universities: 66
- Private Universities: 148

== Functions ==
- Granting approval for all academic programmes run in Nigerian universities;
- Granting approval for the establishment of all higher educational institutions offering degree programmes in Nigerian universities;
- Ensure quality assurance of all academic programmes offered in Nigerian universities; and
- Channel for all external support to Nigerian universities.

== See also ==
- List of universities in Nigeria
