= Academic Staff Union of Universities =

Union of university academic staff

- Abbreviation: ASUU
- Formation: 1978
- Type: Trade union
- Headquarters: University of Abuja
- Location: Abuja, Nigeria
- Members: Academic Staff of Nigerian Universities
- Official language: English
- National President: Professor Chris Piwuna
- Affiliations: Nigeria Labour Congress (NLC)

The Academic Staff Union of Universities (ASUU) is a Nigerian union of university academic staff, founded in 1978. ASUU is an offshoot of the Nigerian Association of University Teachers (NAUT) which was established in 1965. At that time, NAUT consisted of only five universities in total including University of Ibadan, University of Nigeria, Nsukka, Ahmadu Bello University, Zaria, University of Ife and University of Lagos.

== Foundation ==
As a successor to the Nigerian Association of University Teachers that was founded in 1965, ASUU was formed in 1978 to cater for the interests of all academic staff in Federal and State universities in Nigeria.

== Leadership of ASUU ==
Professor Chris Piwuna, a Professor of Medicine and Consultant Psychiatrist at University of Jos/Jos University Teaching Hospital was elected ASUU president during the union’s 23rd National Delegates Congress at the University of Benin held in May 2025. He took over from Professor Emmanuel Osodeke, a professor of Soil Science at the Michael Okpara University of Agriculture, Umudike, Abia State.

== ASUU Presidents ==
The union has had 14 presidents since its founding in 1978.

President	Start	End
Prof. I.O. Agbede	1977	1978
Dr. B.A. Ogundimu	1979	1980
Prof. Biodun Jeyifo	1980	1982
Dr. Mahmud Modibbo Tukur	1982	1986
Prof. Festus Iyayi	1987	1990
Prof. Attahiru Mohammed Jega	1990	1994
Prof. Assissi Asobie	1994	2000
Dr. Dipo Fashina	2000	2004
Dr. Abdullahi Sule-Kano	2004	2008
Prof. Ukachukwu Awuzie	2008	2012
Dr. Nasir Isa Fagge	2012	2016
Prof. Biodun Ogunyemi	2016	2021
Prof. Emmanuel Osodeke	2021	2025
Prof. Chris Piwuna	2025	Present

== ASUU strikes ==
=== Military regime ===
The Union was active in struggles against the military regime during the 1980s. In 1988 the union organized a National Strike to obtain fair wages and university autonomy. As a result, the ASUU was proscribed on 7 August 1988 and all its property seized. It was allowed to resume in 1990, but after another strike was again banned on 23 August 1992. However, an agreement was reached on 3 September 1992 that met several of the union's demands including the right of workers to collective bargaining. The ASUU organized further strikes in 1994 and 1996, protesting against the dismissal of staff by the Sani Abacha military regime.

=== Fourth Republic ===
After the return to democracy in 1999 with the Nigerian Fourth Republic, the union continued to be firm in demanding the rights of university workers against opposition by the government of President Olusegun Obasanjo. In July 2002 Dr. Oladipo Fashina, the then national president of the union, petitioned Justice Mustapha Akanbi of the Independent Corrupt Practices Commission to investigate the authorities of the University of Ilorin for financial mismanagement and corruption.

=== 2007-2013 strikes ===
In 2007, the ASUU went on strike for three months. In May 2008, embarked on a two one-week "warning strike" to press a range of demands, including an improved salary scheme and reinstatement of 49 lecturers who were dismissed many years earlier. In June 2009, ASUU ordered its members in federal and state universities nationwide to proceed on an indefinite strike over disagreements with the Federal Government on an agreement it reached with the union about two and a half years earlier. After three months of strikes, in October 2009, the union and other staff unions signed a memorandum of understanding with the government and called off the industrial action. On 1 July 2013, ASUU embarked on another strike which lasted 5 months and 15 days was called off on 16 December 2013. Claims made by ASUU in regards to the strike are centered largely on funding and revitalization of Nigerian public universities as well as a certain earned allowance which it claims to be an arrears of 92 billion naira. Some Nigerian students said that the strike was a curse to them while others said it was a blessing before the ASUU strike was called.

=== 2022 strike ===
In 2022, ASUU declared a one-month strike, beginning 14 February 2022. Some of the lecturers' demands included the revitalisation of public universities, earned allowances, improved funding of state universities and payment of promotion arrears. On 7 March 2022, Minister of Education, Adamu Adamu inaugurated a committee to renegotiate the 2009 agreement with ASUU. The seven-man panel had Prof. Emeritus Nimi Briggs as chairman. On 14 March, ASUU extended the strike by 8 more weeks. The Federal Government eventually met ASUU on 11 April 2022, exactly 56 days since the commencement of the strike. On 9 May, ASUU extended the strike by additional 12 weeks, and the strike reached six months without resolution, making it one of the longest ASUU strikes in history. On 1 August 2022, ASUU extended the strike by another four weeks. The FG met ASUU on 16 August 2022, to continue negotiations, with ASUU promising to suspend the strike if its demands were met, but the meeting ended in deadlock. ASUU subsequently said it would begin consultation on the next line of action. ASUU local chapters at ABU, BUK, UDUS, OAU voted for continuation and declaration of an indefinite strike in response to government's offer. State universities such as Benue State University, TASUED, Adekunle Ajasin University, Kano State University of Technology have also insisted on prosecuting the strike to its logical conclusion.

After 234 days (33 weeks) of strike action by ASUU, the Federal Government of Nigeria on Thursday, 5 October 2022 announced the formation of two new academic unions - the National Association of Medical and Dental Academics (NAMDA) and the Congress of Nigerian University Academics (CONUA). ASUU eventually called off the 8-month strike on 14 October 2022.

=== ASUU strike chart (1999–2022) ===
ASUU Strike
s/n	Year	Duration
1	1999	5 months
2	2001	3 months
3	2002	2 weeks
4	2003	6 months
5	2005	2 weeks
6	2006	3 days
7	2007	3 months
8	2008	1 weeks
9	2009	4 months
10	2010	5 months
11	2011	59 days
12	2013	5 months
13	2017	1 month
14	2018	3 months
15	2020	9 months
16	2022	14 February 2022 – 14 October 2022 (8 months)

=== Origin of incessant strikes ===
The union has repeatedly maintained that the strikes are a response to the Nigerian government's "insincerity" and perennial refusal to uphold agreement signed with ASUU.

=== Impact of strikes on students ===
While the association continues to claim that it is involved in a struggle for Nigerian tertiary education and Nigerian students by extension, many Nigerians perceive the supposed struggle, marked by incessant strike actions, to be malicious and self serving. This image has not been helped by ASUU, who still cannot communicate effectively with the Nigerian populace without sounding arrogant and condescending.
