= Zayyad Ibrahim =

Nigerian politician

Member of the House of Representatives of Nigeria from Kaduna State
- In office 2019–2023
- Succeeded by: Hussaini Muhammad Jallo
- Constituency: Igabi

Personal details
- Born: 22 March 1965 (age 61)
- Party: All Progressives Congress
- Occupation: Politician

Zayyad Ibrahim (born 1965) is a Nigerian politician. He served as a member representing Igabi Federal Constituency of Kaduna State in the House of Representatives 9th Parliament from 2019 to 2023.

== Early life ==
Zayyad Ibrahim was born on 22 March 1965 and hails from Kaduna State.

== Political career ==
In the rerun elections of 2023, Ibrahim contested again under the platform of the All Progressives Congress but was defeated by his close rival Hussaini Muhammad Jallo of the Peoples Democratic Party.

Hon. Zayyad implemented an initiative, in partnership with Rt. Hon. Yusuf Ibrahim Zailani, Speaker of the Kaduna State House of Assembly who also doubled as Chairman of the Northern Speakers Forum, to empower their constituents with fertilizers and over 30,000,000 naira to improve their livelihood.

He was preceded in office by Muhammad Abubakar and was succeeded by Mohammed Hussaini Jallo.
