= Aminu Abdullahi Shagali =

Nigerian politician

Commissioner Housing and Urban Development
- Incumbent
- Assumed office 2023
- Preceded by: Fausat Adebola Ibikunle

Speaker Kaduna State House of Assembly (2015-2020)
- Constituency: Sabon gari
- In office 2015–2020
- Succeeded by: Yusuf Ibrahim Zailani

Member of the Kaduna State House of Assembly

Personal details
- Born: 13 February 1980 (age 46)
- Party: All Progressive Congress (APC)
- Relations: Married
- Children: 5
- Education: UDUAhmadu Bello University, University of Bakh ET RUDA Sudan
- Occupation: Politician, Legislature and Farmer
- Profession: Businessman
- Website: https://twitter.com/abumuhibba

Aminu Abdullahi Shagali is a Nigerian politician, academic and a public servant. He is the current commissioner of Ministry of Housing and Urban Developments. He served as the special adviser on political matter to Gov. Nasir El-Rufai and the same capacity in APC Gubernatorial campaign for the 2023 general elections. Moreover, he served as the speaker of the 5th Kaduna Assembly.

== Early life and education ==
Shagali was born on 13 February 1980, the fifth child of Alhaji Abdullahi Shagali and also the fifth to Hajia Zulaihat Shagali. He attended Bako Zuntu Nursery and Primary School, Zaria (1986–1993), Federal Government College, Daura in Katsina State (1993–1999), and Kaduna State Polytechnic, Zaria (now Nuhu Bamalli Polytechnic) where he sat for the Interim Joint Matriculation Board examination in 2000.

Shagali studied political science at Usmanu Danfodiyo University, Sokoto, and completed a master's degree in public administration at Ahmadu Bello University Zaria in 2008. He also obtained another master's degree in disaster risk management and administration. He obtained a doctoral degree (PhD) in rural development at the University of Bakhtalruda, Sudan.

Another Master of philosophy was obtained from public Administration in 2019, from Ahmadu Bello University. He bagged PhD in Public Administration Department in Ahmadu Bello University Zaria, after conducting investigative research on Kaduna state legislative affairs.

He is an author of 24 academic journal publications and has presented 12 political and administrative conference papers.

== Political career ==
In 2013, five political parties including the CPC merged and formed the All Progressives Congress (APC), the party that won the Nigerian general elections, 2015.

On 11 April 2015, Shagali was re-elected to represent his constituency in the state parliament.

Between 2011 and June 2015, Shagali held many key positions in the Assembly; he was Deputy Minority Leader and Chairman, House Committee on Science and Technology, Deputy Chairman, House committee on Hajj and Islamic affairs, and Deputy Chairman House Committee on Economic Planning.

In 2022, Shagali was appointed by his Excellency Gov. Nasir El rufa’I as the special adviser for political matters of the state. He was equally appointed by Mallam Uba Sani as special adviser on the same political matters in the Kaduna state All Progressive Congress Gubernatorial campaign council on 27 October 2022.

Shagali's colleagues elected him as Speaker of the 5th State Assembly on 8 June 2015. He is a member representing Sabon Gari constituency in the Kaduna State House of Assembly since 2011. He was elected under the Congress for Progressive Change (CPC), one of the opposition political parties founded by his mentor Muhammadu Buhari.

Shagali was reelected as a member in Governorship and State Assembly Elections in March 2019 defeating the PDP candidate and other political parties, he was unanimously elected as the speaker of the state Assembly on 12 June 2019 and served for 8 months 10 days and resigned based on personal reasons. Which he was preceded by the new elected speaker Hon.Yusuf Ibrahim Zailani.

== Bills and motion sponsored ==
Shagali was the then 5th speaker of Kaduna State House of Assembly, under his watch as the 5th speaker of the State, a total number of 86 bills were received and 82 bills have been passed into law. He co-sponsored and passed the Kaduna Investment Promotion agency bill, which paves way to The Kaduna State Investment Promotion Agency (KADIPA) achievements and economic sustainability.
