= Shehu Usman Adamu =

Nigerian academic

Professor Shehu Usman Adamu Modibbo
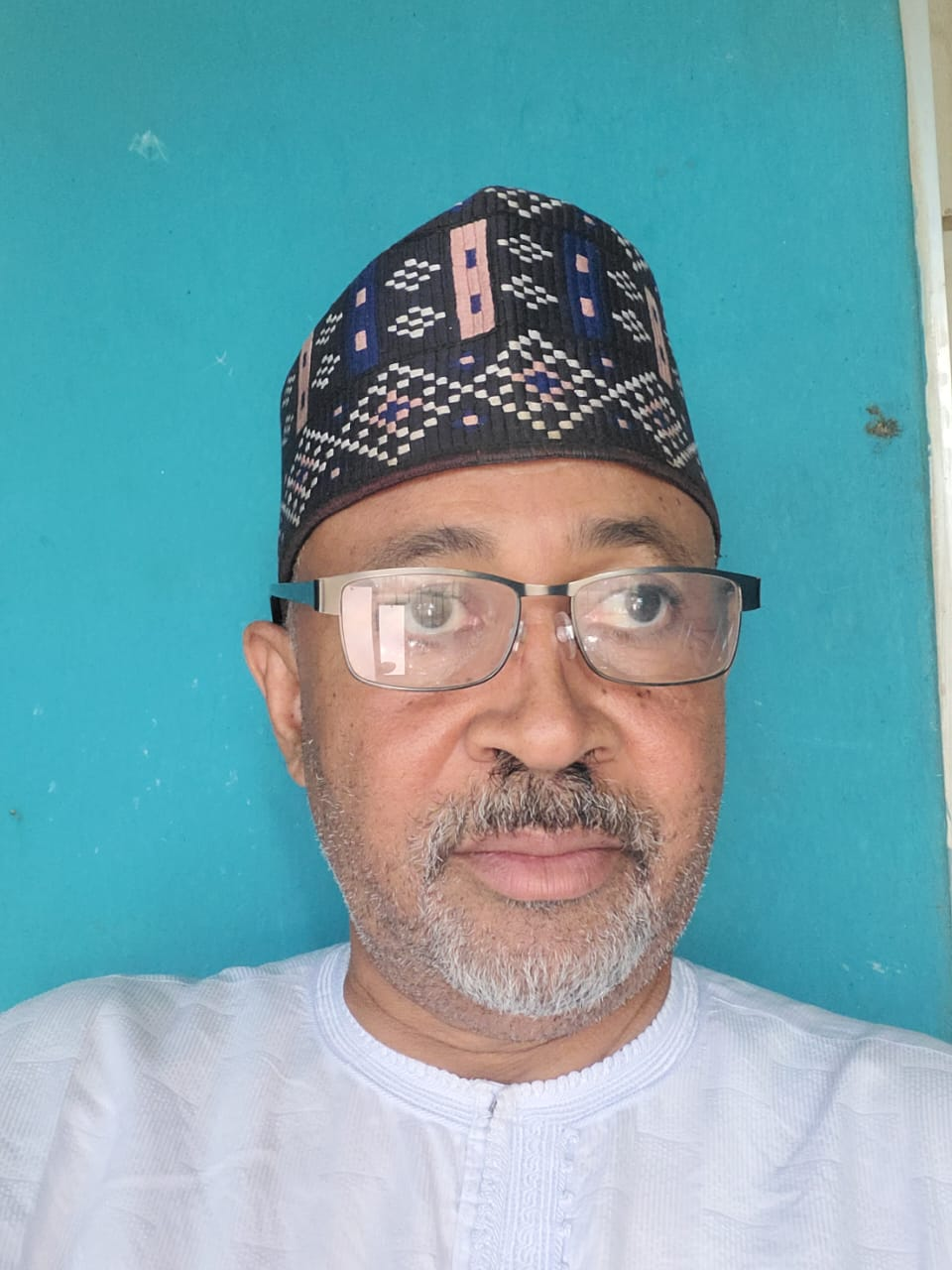

Dean Faculty of Health Sciences National Open University of Nigeria
- In office 2020–2024

Commissioner Kaduna State
- In office 2015–2017
- Governor: Nasir Elrufai

Minority Leader Kaduna State House of Assembly
- In office 2011–2013

Personal details
- Born: 4 November 1968 Tudun Saibu, Kaduna State
- Education: University of Liverpool; Abubakar Tafawa Balewa University; Usman Danfodiyo University
- Profession: Professor
- Website: https://www.noun.edu.ng/

Shehu Usman Adamu (born 4 November 1968) is a Nigerian professor, politician, administrator, former Member, Kaduna State House of Assembly, public commentator and political analyst. He has some 36 publications on Google Scholar cited 130 times between 2007 and 2025.

== Early life ==
Adamu was born on 4 November 1968, at Tudun Saibu, of Soba Local Government Area, of Kaduna State. He attended Tudun Sabiu Primary School between 1974 and 1980. He attended Government Secondary School, Saminaka between 1980 and 1985. He attended Kano State College of Art and Science between 1986 and 1988. He earned a Bachelor of Science in Zoology from Usman Danfodiyo University Sokoto in 1994. He completed a Master of Science and Doctor of Philosophy in Applied Parasitology from Abubakar Tafawa Balewa University, Bauchi in 1998 and 2004, respectively. Adamu earned a master's degree in Public Health at the University of Liverpool, United Kingdom in 2013, and a postgraduate diploma in Education from National Open University of Nigeria in 2022.

== Career ==
Adamu began his career as a graduate assistant with Abubakar Tafawa Balewa University Bauchi, rising. to the level of senior lecturer. There he held many responsibilities, including committee member, level coordinator, up to project and IT officer in consultancy.

He entered politics in 2006 and ran in the 2007 Nigerian general election to represent Maigana Constituency of Soba Local Government. He won election as Kaduna State House of Assembly Member. He ran again in the 2011 Nigerian general election under the defunct Congress for Progressive Change. Winning the election, Adamu become the Minority Leader in the Kaduna State House of Assembly in 2011.

He served as the Commissioner in Kaduna State under the former Governor Malam Nasir Elrufai between 2015 and 2017.
