= Bashir Garba =

Nigeria academician

Prof. Bashir Garba, MFR

Vice-chancellor Usmanu Danfodiyo University
- Incumbent
- Assumed office 2024
- Preceded by: Lawal Bilbis

Personal details
- Education: Usmanu Danfodiyo University; University of Jos
- Profession: Academic administrator, Professor

Prof. Bashir Garba MFR, is a Nigerian Politician and a Professor of Applied Chemistry. He became a Professor at age 36, making him one of the youngest professors in Nigerian history. He served as the Secretary to the State Government (SSG) of Sokoto State and as Director at the Energy Commission of Nigeria. He is also the former Vice Chancellor of Sokoto State University and the current Vice-Chancellor of Usmanu Danfodiyo University Sokoto since August 2024.

== Educational background ==
Garba attended Magajin Rafi Primary School, Sokoto from 1973 to 1979 and proceeded to Government Secondary Technical School, Talata Mafara from 1989 to 1984. He also attended Usmanu Danfodiyo University, Sokoto and the University of Jos.

He holds a Bachelor's degree in Applied Chemistry, a Master's degree in Applied Organic Chemistry, as well as a Doctorate degree in Applied Chemistry.

== Career ==
Garba has held various academic and political offices during his career.

Garba served as the director, Sokoto Energy Research Centre, Usmanu Danfodiyo University, Sokoto between 1999 and 2005.

He also served as the director of Energy Management, Training and Manpower Development of the Energy Commission of Nigeria between 2006 and 2010.

Garba served as the Secretary to the State Government of Sokoto State before he later served as a Commissioner for Higher Education in the state. Prior to his appointment as Vice Chancellor of Sokoto State University,

== Awards ==
- Garba is a recipient of the Member of the Federal Republic (MFR) national award.
