= Hafsat =

Hafsat is a given name. Notable people with the name include:

- Hafsat Abdulwaheed (born 1952), Nigerian writer
- Hafsat Abiola, (born 1974), Nigerian activist
- Hafsat Mohammed Baba (born 1957), Nigerian politician
- Hafsat Ganduje (born 1960), Nigerian academic
- Hafsat Idris (born 1987), Nigerian actress
