= Abdullahi Ibrahim Musa =

Nigerian academic and librarian

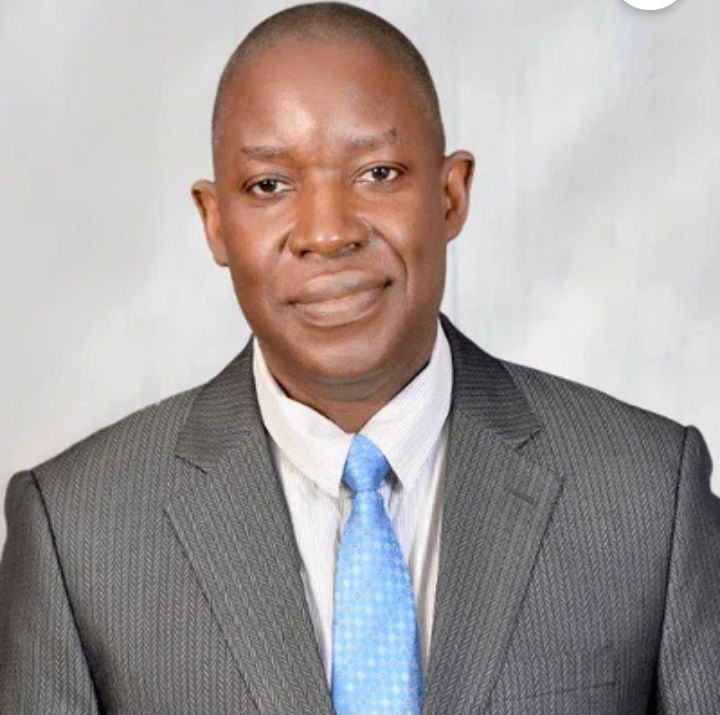
- Citizenship: Nigeria
- Occupation: Librarian
- Title: Vice-chancellor; Former University Librarian

Abdullahi Ibrahim Musa is an academician and a professor of Librarianship in Nigeria. He is the current Vice Chancellor of Kaduna State University (KASU). He was appointed by former governor of Kaduna State, Malam Nasir Ahmad El-Rufa’i. He assumed office on 14 November 2022. He took over from Professor Abdullahi Musa Ashafa, who occupied the position in an acting capacity since 23 June 2022. Until his appointment, Professor Abdullahi Musa also served as the University Librarian at Kaduna State University.

== Early life and education ==
Musa is from the Soba Local Government Area of Kaduna State, and began his academic journey with a bachelor's degree in Library Science from Bayero University, Kano, followed by a master's degree in Library Science from Ahmadu Bello University, Zaria, where he later led the Department of Library and Information Science. He earned his Ph.D. in Information Management, specializing in Information Systems, from Emporia State University in Kansas, USA. He also holds advanced degrees in Information Science, Management Sciences, and Business Administration. Prof. Musa has served as a visiting scholar at the University of Illinois at Urbana-Champaign, specifically at the Graduate School of Information Science and the Mortenson Center for International Programs. His research focuses on health epistemology, health ontology, and social informatics.

== Career ==
- He has served as Head of Department Library and Information Science, Ahmadu Bello University, Zaria. Kaduna State

== Award ==
The Vice-Chancellor of the Year award by Time Africa Magazine on 13 November 2024 at the Nigeria National Merit Award House in Abuja. The award acknowledges his efforts and contributions to the growth of education in Nigeria and beyond.
