= Usman Stingo =

Nigerian politician

Member of the Kaduna State House of Assembly
- Constituency: Kajuru Constituency

Personal details
- Born: Kaduna State, Nigeria
- Occupation: Politician

Usman Stingo is a Nigerian politician who currently serves as the representative for the Kajuru constituency in the Kaduna State House of Assembly.
