= Bayero Salih-Farah =

Current director general of Nigerian Institute of Transport Technology, Zaria

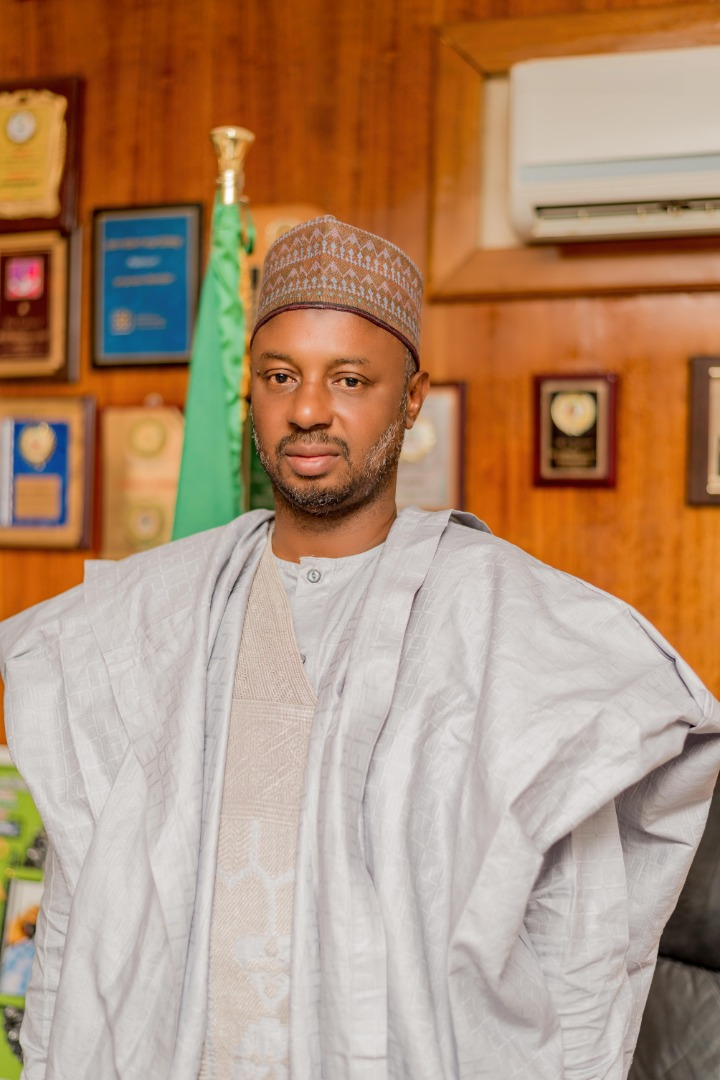
- Salih-Farah
- Born: 11 March 1964; Kagoro
- Education: Ahmadu Bello University; Usmanu Danfodiyo University; University of Huddersfield
- Occupation: Politician

Bayero Salih-Farah (born 11 March 1964), is the current director-general of the Nigerian Institute of Transport Technology, Zaria.

== Early life and education ==
Salih-Farah was born at Kagoro, Kaura Local Government Area of Kaduna State. In 1987 he obtained a Bachelor of Science Degree in Geography from the Usmanu Danfodiyo University. He is also an alumnus of Ahmadu Bello University, Nigerian Institute of Transport Technology (NITT) and the University of Huddersfield, UK, where he obtained his PhD.
