= Speaker of the Kaduna State House of Assembly =

- Incumbent; Yusuf Liman since February 9, 2024
- Style: The Right Honorable
- Member of: Kaduna State House of Assembly
- Residence: Kaduna State, Nigeria
- Appointer: Members of the Kaduna State House of Assembly
- Term length: 4 years renewable once
- Formation: October 2, 1999
- First holder: Bashir Zubairu; May, 1999

The Speaker of the Kaduna State House of Assembly is the political head of the Kaduna State House of Assembly. Elected by the Members of the Assembly, the speaker's statutory duty is to preside over the sitting and deliberations of the Assembly.
