= Jemimah Gada =

Nigerian lecturer

Dr. Jemimah Dan’azumi Gada
- Born: Jemimah Dan’azumi Gada
- Education: Babcock University, Ahmadu Bello University
- Occupations: Linguist, lecturer, scholar
- Employer: Kaduna State University

Jemimah Dan'azumi Gada is a Nigerian Senior lecturer, writer, and scholar. She has academic publications in English Language, sociolinguistics, and literary analysis. She lectures at the Department of English and Drama in Kaduna State University.

== Education and Career ==
Gada is a Senior Lecturer at Kaduna State University. She lectures at the Department of English and Drama. Gada specialises in sociolinguistics, English Language and Literary Analysis. Presently, she is a Senior Lecturer at the Department of English and Drama.

Gada obtained her First School Leaving Certificate from L.E.A Primary School, Kayarda, in the year 1980. She obtained her Secondary School Certificate from Govt. Day Teachers' College, Yarkasuwa in the year 1986, and holds a degree in Bachelor of Arts in education (English) from Ahmadu Bello University in the year 1998. She also obtained a Master of Arts in English Language degree from the same institution in the year 2013, and a PhD in English Language from Babcock University in 2022.

== Research and publications ==
Gada has twenty academic publications, spanning through linguistics, sociolinguistics, and Literary analysis. The following is a selected list of her works:

- Gada, Jemimah Dan'azumi (2020). "Mood and the potrayal of conversation dominance in Adong's Silent Voices". Voices 4 (3): 1–11
- Gada, Jemimah Dan'azumi (2023). "Modality and the construction of female supremacy in conversations of selected drama texts". Dutse Journal of English, Literature and Linguistics (DJELL) 1 (2): 95–111
- Gada, Jemimah Dan'azumi (2024). "A stylistic analysis of legal English: a study of three selected 2001 Supreme Court judgements". Kaduna State University Journal of French (KASUJOF) 8 (1): 33–44
- Gada, Jemimah Dan'azumi (2024). "An exploration into the syntax of negation in Kurama (Akurmi) language". Dutsin-Ma Journal of English and Literature 9 (2): 498–514
- Gada, Jemimah Dan'azumi (2025). "Exploring the depictions of conversation dominance in a dong's silent voices". IAAJAH-IGWEBUIKE: An African Journal of Arts and Humanities. 11 (2): 13-23
