= Fausat =

Fausat is a Muslim feminine given name meaning triumph. Notable people with the name include:

- Fausat Balogun (born 1959), Nigerian actress
- Fausat Adebola Ibikunle (fl. 1983), Nigerian administrator
