= Nuhu Yaqub =

Nigerian scholar

- In office 2013–2017

Vice-Chancellor of Sokoto State University
- Preceded by: Pioneer Vice-Chancellor
- Succeeded by: Prof. Sani Muhammad Dangogo

Vice-Chancellor of University of Abuja
- In office June 2004 – June 2009
- Preceded by: Professor Gambo Laraba
- Succeeded by: Professor James Sunday Adelabu

Personal details
- Born: 3 March 1951 (age 75)
- Died: 4 January 2025 (age 21 months) Abuja, Nigeria
- Education: Bayero University Kano; University of Toronto; University of Sussex
- Occupation: Academic, Political Scientist

Nuhu Omeiza Yaqub (3 March 1951 – 4 January 2025) was a Nigerian political science scholar. He was the former Vice-Chancellor of the University of Abuja (UNIABUJA) from June 2004 to 2009 and later as the pioneer Vice-Chancellor of Sokoto State University.

== Early life and education ==
Yaqub was born in Okene, present-day Kogi State, on 3 March 1951. After completing his elementary and secondary education, he gained admission to Bayero University, Kano, where he graduated with a Bachelor of Science (BSc) in Political Science (1977–1980). He also attended the University of Toronto (1982–1983) and the University of Sussex, Brighton, United Kingdom (1984–1989), where he obtained a master's degree and a doctorate degree, respectively.

== Career ==
Yaqub began his career at Usman Danfodiyo University, Sokoto State, as a lecturer immediately after earning his first degree. He started as an Assistant Lecturer and rose to the rank of Professor in 1998. During his tenure, he held several academic and administrative positions, including Head of the Political Science Department and later Dean of the Faculty of Social Sciences.

In June 2004, Yaqub was appointed Vice-Chancellor of the University of Abuja for a five-year term. From 2010 to 2011, he served as a Scholar-in-Residence at Wake Forest University, Winston-Salem, United States. Upon returning to Nigeria, he became the first Vice-Chancellor of Sokoto State University, serving from 2012 to 2017. He was later appointed the Chairman of the National Institute for Legislative and Democratic Studies (NILDS) Academic Advisory Board and was a member of board of trustees of Nigeria Association of Nephrology.

== Publications ==
Yaqub's works and lectures have been published in several journals, including:

- “Quasi-Democracy and Autocracy as Governance Systems in Nigeria: An Examination”
- “How Variants of Political Banditry Have Impacted Adversely on the Development and Consolidation of Democracy in Nigeria”
- “The 1993 Presidential Elections in Nigeria and the Alleged Use of Excessive Money: Implications for the Country's Political Culture and Future Politics”

== Death ==
Professor Yaqub died on 4 January 2025 in the Federal Capital Territory, Abuja.
