= Kaduna State University =

University in Kaduna, Nigeria

- KASU
- Motto: Knowledge for Development and Unity
- Type: Public
- Established: 2004
- Vice-Chancellor: Prof. Abdullahi I. Musa
- Faculty: 9
- Location: Kaduna, Kaduna State, Nigeria
- Campus: Urban
- Colours: Green, white and red
- Website: Official website

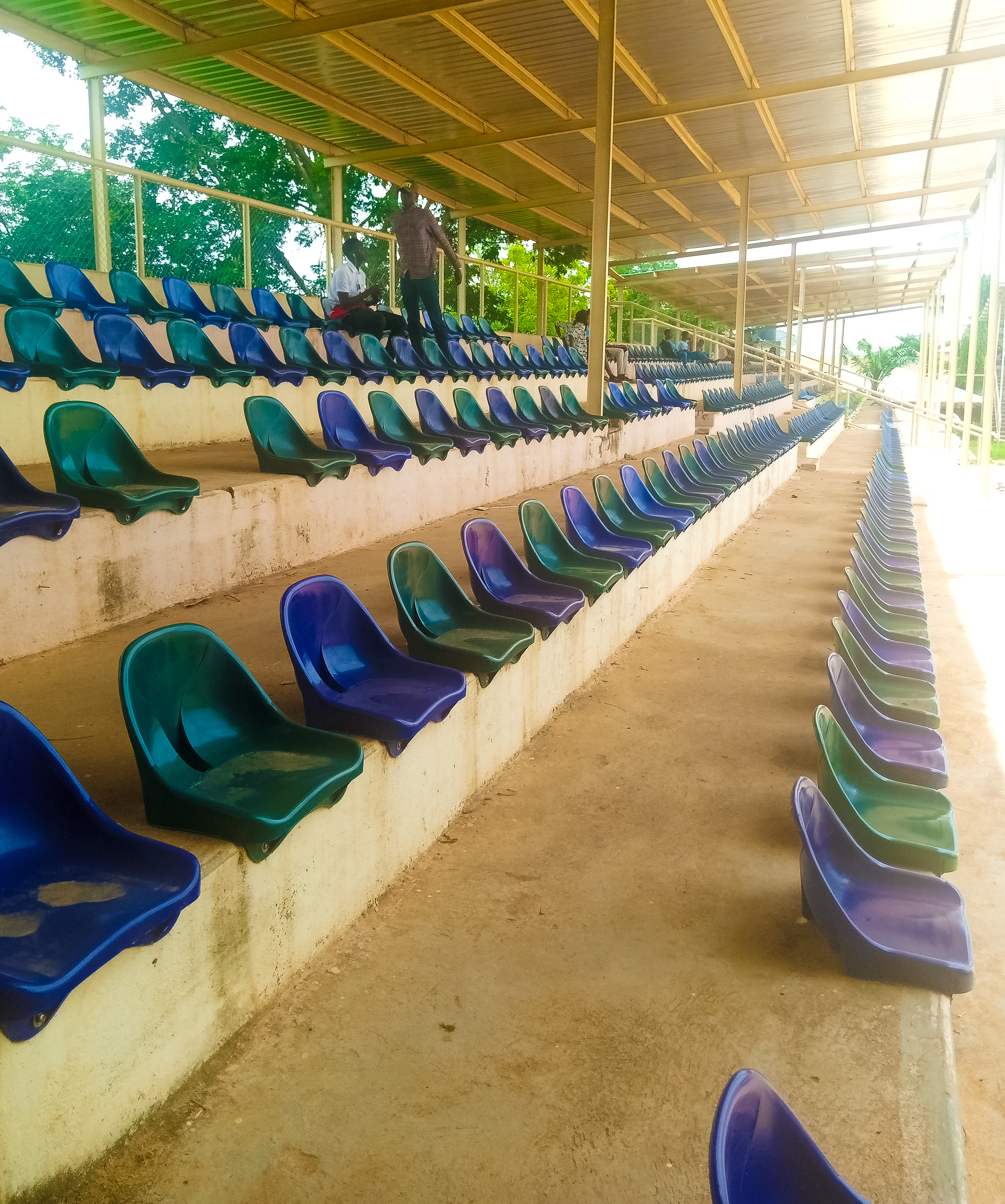
Kaduna State University stadium seats

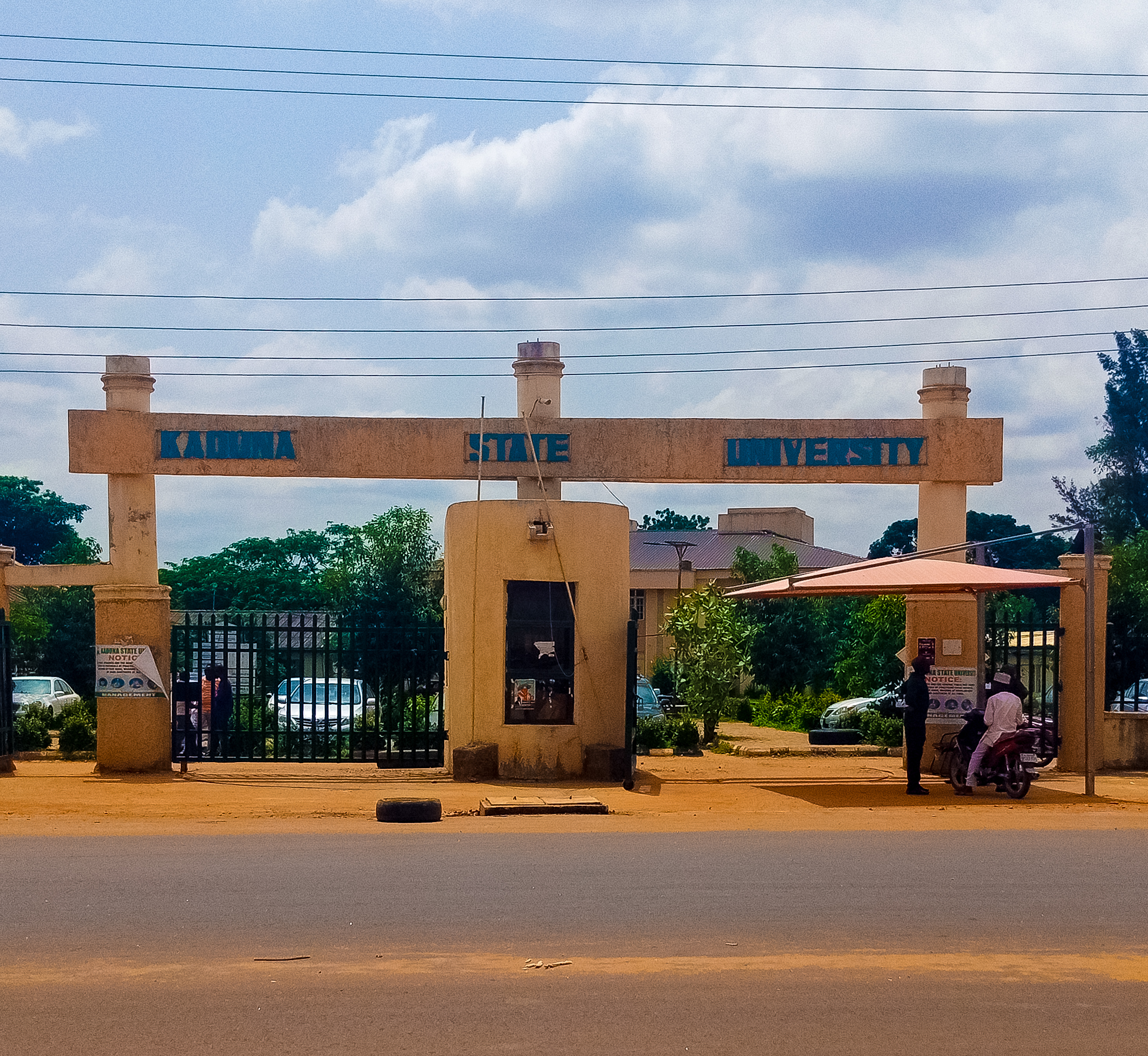
Entrance of Kaduna State University

Kaduna State University is located in Kaduna, Kaduna State, Nigeria. It was established in 2004. It has sixteen faculties with over 50 departments. The school has two main campuses in Kafanchan and Kaduna City.

== History ==
The Kaduna State University was established under the Kaduna State law promulgated in May 2004. The promulgation followed the need to boost higher education in the northern and southern parts of the state. Consequently, two campuses were approved: one in Kaduna and the other in Kafanchan. The Kaduna campus started running with basic degree programs by former Governor Dr. Ahmed Mohammed Makarfi, the then executive governor of Kaduna State and Visitor to the university, appointed Professor Idris Abdulkadir to be the pro-chancellor and chairman of the Governing Council while Professor Abubakar Sani Sambo was appointed the first vice-chancellor. Professor Aminu S. Mikailu took over from Professor Sambo as second vice-chancellor when the latter was appointed by the Federal Government to head the Nigerian Energy Commission.

Professor Ezzeldin Muktar Abdurahman was the third VC. Professor W.B. Quirix was appointed as the fourth VC in January 2012. However, he did not complete the full five-year tenure. Subsequently, Professor Ado-Baba Ahmed was appointed as the acting vice-chancellor from 16 September 2016 until 24 January 2017. Professor Muhammad Tanko took office as vice-chancellor from 2017 to 2021.

Professor Yohanna Tella acted as VC from January to June 2022. Professor Abdullahi Musa Ashafa briefly assumed the role of acting vice-chancellor from 22 June 2022, until the appointment of Professor Abdullahi Ibrahim Musa by Malam Nasir El-Rufai, the Government of Kaduna State as the present vice-chancellor on 19 October 2022. His Royal Highness, Sanusi Lamido Sanusi is the current pro-chancellor, while Hussaini Adamu Dikko is the chairman of the Governing Council.

== Library ==
The library is an academy established in 2004 to support teaching, learning and research of the university. The main library is located in the main campus with information recourses in all subject areas covered by the school. Online databases are available with journal information systems from different faculties.

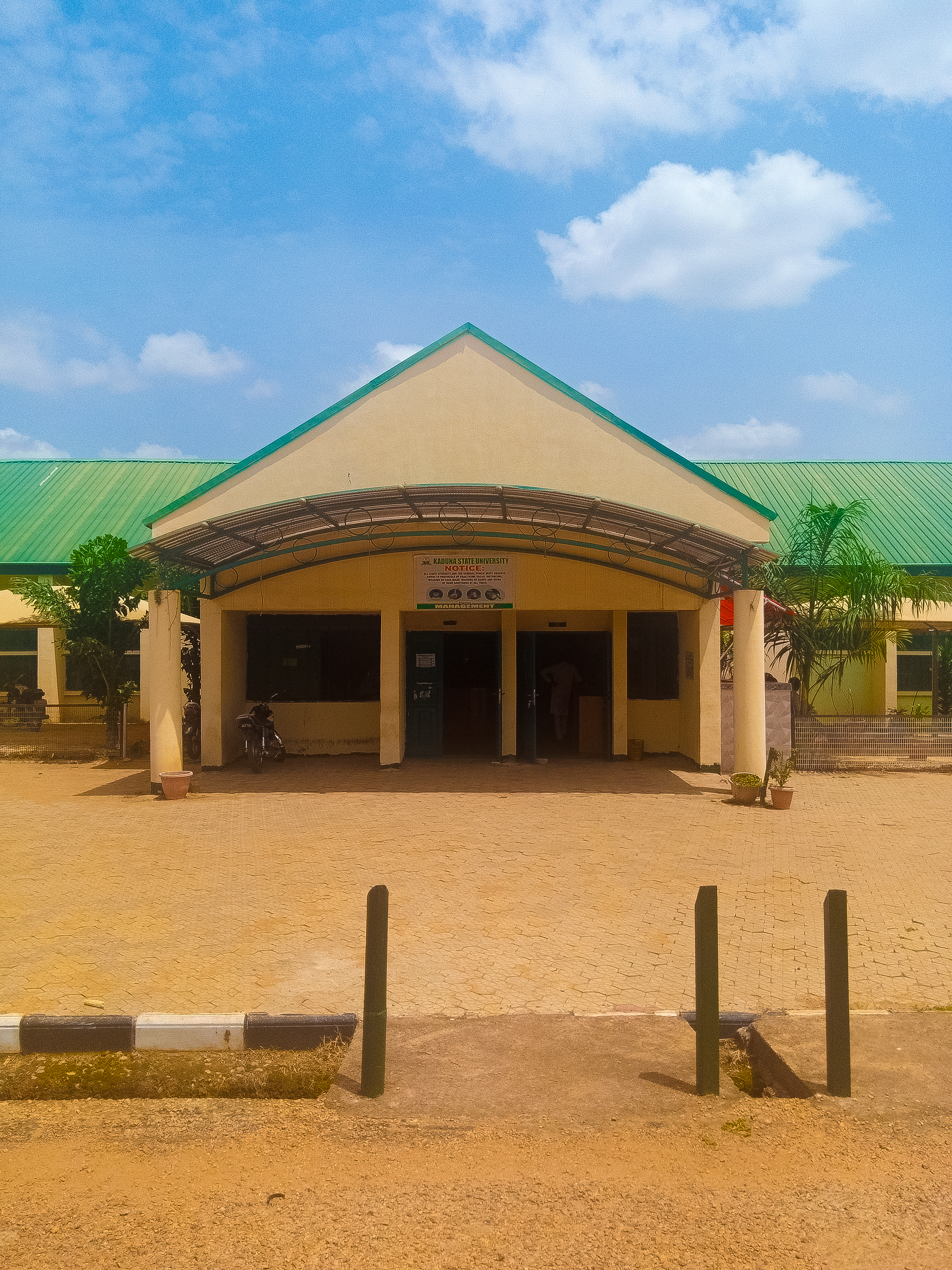
Kaduna State University main library entrance

== Administration ==
Kaduna State University has a chancellor as its ceremonial head, while the vice-chancellor acts as the provost, like in other Nigerian Universities. The vice-chancellor is usually appointed for a five-year, non-renewable term. After Professor Abdullahi Musa Ashafa took office on 22 June 2022 as acting vice-chancellor, Prof Abdullahi Ibrahim Musa was later appointed by Malam Nasir El-Rufai, the then governor of Kaduna State, as the present vice-chancellor on 19 October 2022.

Below is the tabulated list of all KASU vice-chancellors. The numbers 4, 6, 8 and 9 are all acting vice chancellors, who assumed the position pending substantive appointment of a VC by the university's governing council.

S/N	Name	Tenure	Profession
1	Professor Abubakar Sani Sambo	2004	Mechanical engineer
2	Professor Aminu Salihu Mikailu	2005-2006	Management accounting
3	Professor Ezzeldin Muktar Abdurahman	2007–2012	Pharmacist
4	Professor Muhammad Tanko (Ag)	2012	Accounting
5	Professor William Barnabas Qurix	2012–2017	Architect
6	Professor Ado-Baba Ahmed (Ag)	2017	Biologist
7	Professor Muhammad Tanko	2017–2022	Accounting
8	Professor Yohanna Tella (Ag)	2022	Mathematician
9	Professor Abdullahi Musa Ashafa	2022	Historian
10	Professor Abdullahi Ibrahim Musa	2022–present	Librarian

Table source: Undergraduate Handbook 11th ed.

== Colleges and faculties ==
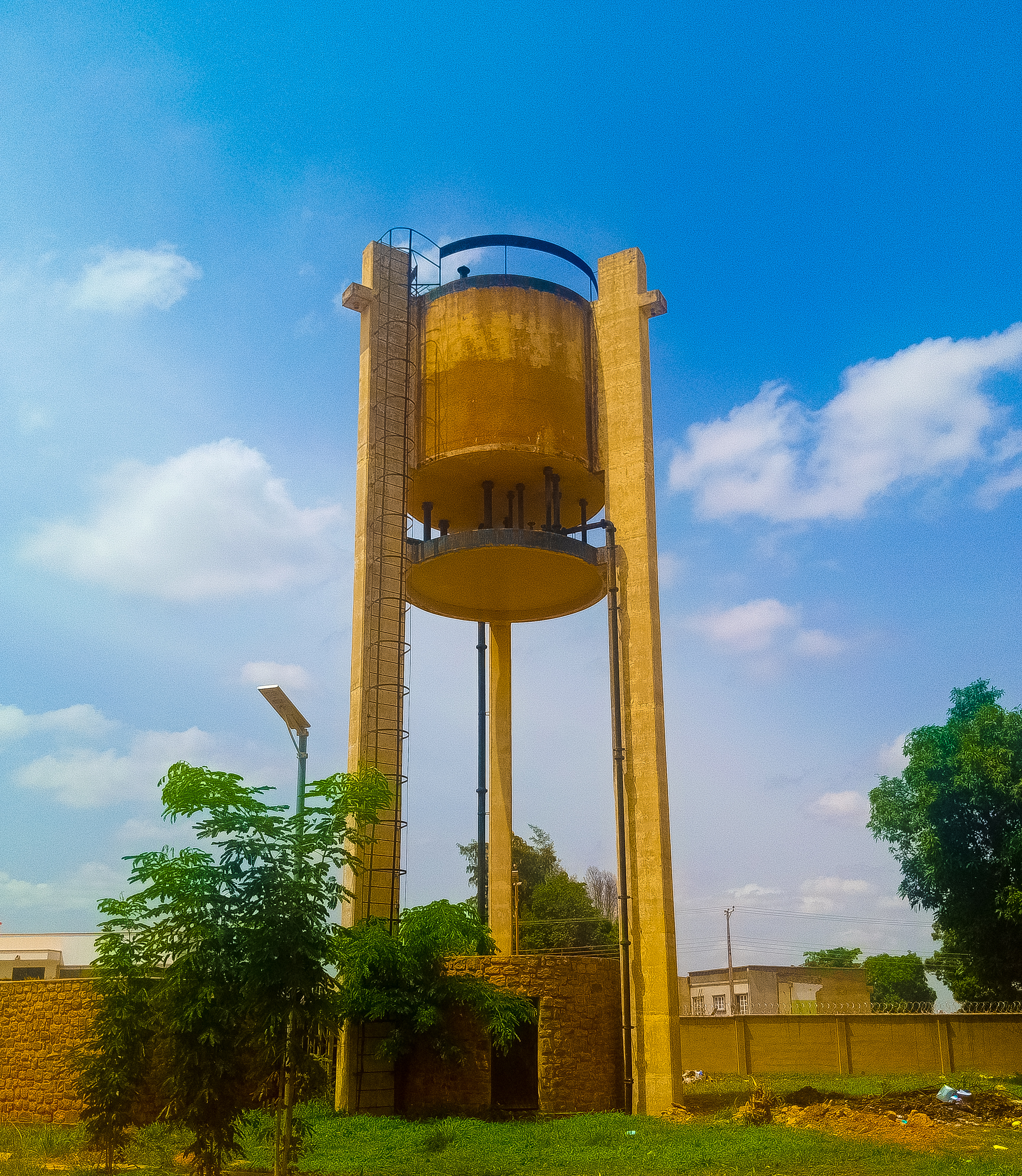
Kaduna State University monument

The university's senate has now reorganized the school faculties into the collegiate system:

=== College of Humanities, Education & Law ===
The college consists of:

- Faculty of Arts
- Faculty of Education

=== Faculty of Arts ===
The Faculty of Arts is among the pioneer faculties of the university, established in 2005. It has seven departments.

The Faculty of Arts comprises the following departments at the Kaduna Campus:

- Arabic
- Christian Religious Studies
- English and Drama
- French
- History
- Islamic Studies
- Nigerian Languages & Linguistics

=== Faculty of Education ===
The Faculty of Education is situated at Makera, Kakuri Campus of the institution with three departments and 11 programs as follows:

Department of Arts and Social Science Education

- A. (Ed) Arabic Education
- A. (Ed) English Education
- A. (Ed) Christian Religious Studies Education
- A. (Ed) Islamic Religious Studies Education
- A. (Ed) Economics Education
- A. (Ed) Hausa Education

The faculty publishes the Kaduna Journal of Education (KADAJE).

Department of Science Education

- Sc. (Ed) Biology Education
- Sc. (Ed) Chemistry Education
- Sc. (Ed) Geography Education
- Sc. (Ed) Mathematics Education
- Sc. (Ed) Physics Education

Department of Educational Foundations

These department services the other two departments.

=== College of Science, Computing & Engineering ===
The former Faculty of Science, which was among the pioneer faculties of the university, established in 2005, has been reorganized into three facilities:

- Faculty of Computing
- Faculty of Life Sciences
- Faculty of Physical Sciences

=== Faculty of Life Sciences ===
Offers basic life science courses:

- Biochemistry
- Biological Sciences
- Microbiology

=== Faculty of Computing ===
Faculty of computing now offers the following courses:

- Secure Computing
- Informatics
- Intelligent Computing

=== Faculty of Physical Sciences ===
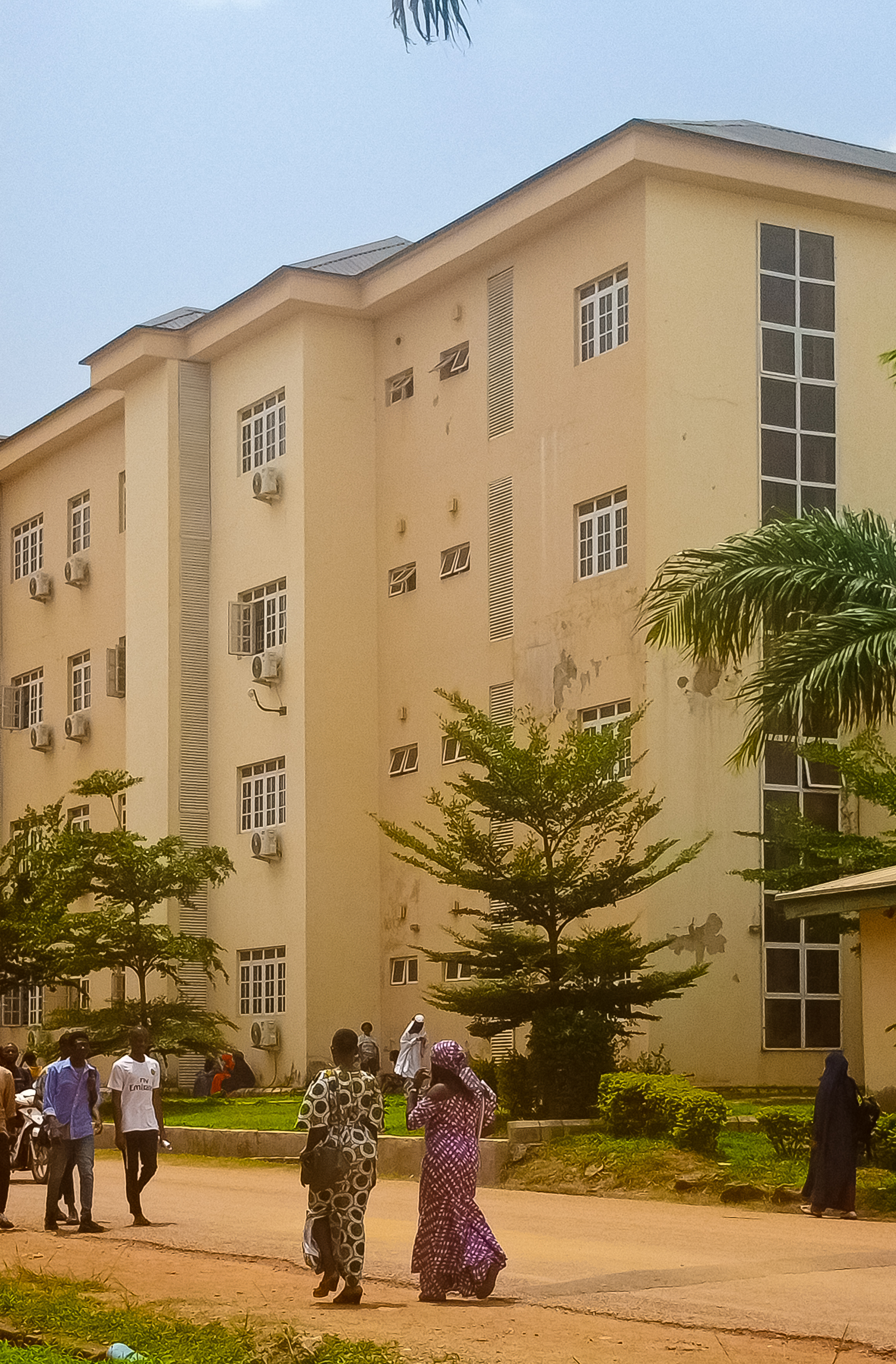
CBN building, housing the Industrial Chemistry Department

Faculty of physical sciences offers basic science courses, including:

- Physics
- Industrial chemistry
- Chemistry
- Geography
- Geophysics
- Geology

=== College of Medicine ===
The previous College of Medicine was established in 2008.

The College of Medicine has now been reorganized into new faculties:

=== Faculty of Basic Medical Sciences ===
This consists of:

- Department of Anatomy
- Department of Human Physiology
- Department of Pathology

=== Faculty of Basic Clinical Sciences ===
- Department of Community Medicine

=== Faculty of Clinical Sciences ===
- Obstetrics and Gynecology
- Internal Medicine
- Surgery

=== Faculty of Dentistry ===
- Department of Dentistry

The Barau Dikko teaching hospital is meant for training of health related students.

=== College of Allied Health & Pharmaceutical Sciences ===
The college consists of a Faculty of Pharmaceutical Sciences and Faculty of Allied Health Sciences.

=== Faculty of Allied Health Sciences ===
This faculty consists of four departments:

- Nursing
- Medical Radiography
- Medical Laboratory Science
- Physiotherapy

=== Faculty of Pharmaceutical Sciences ===
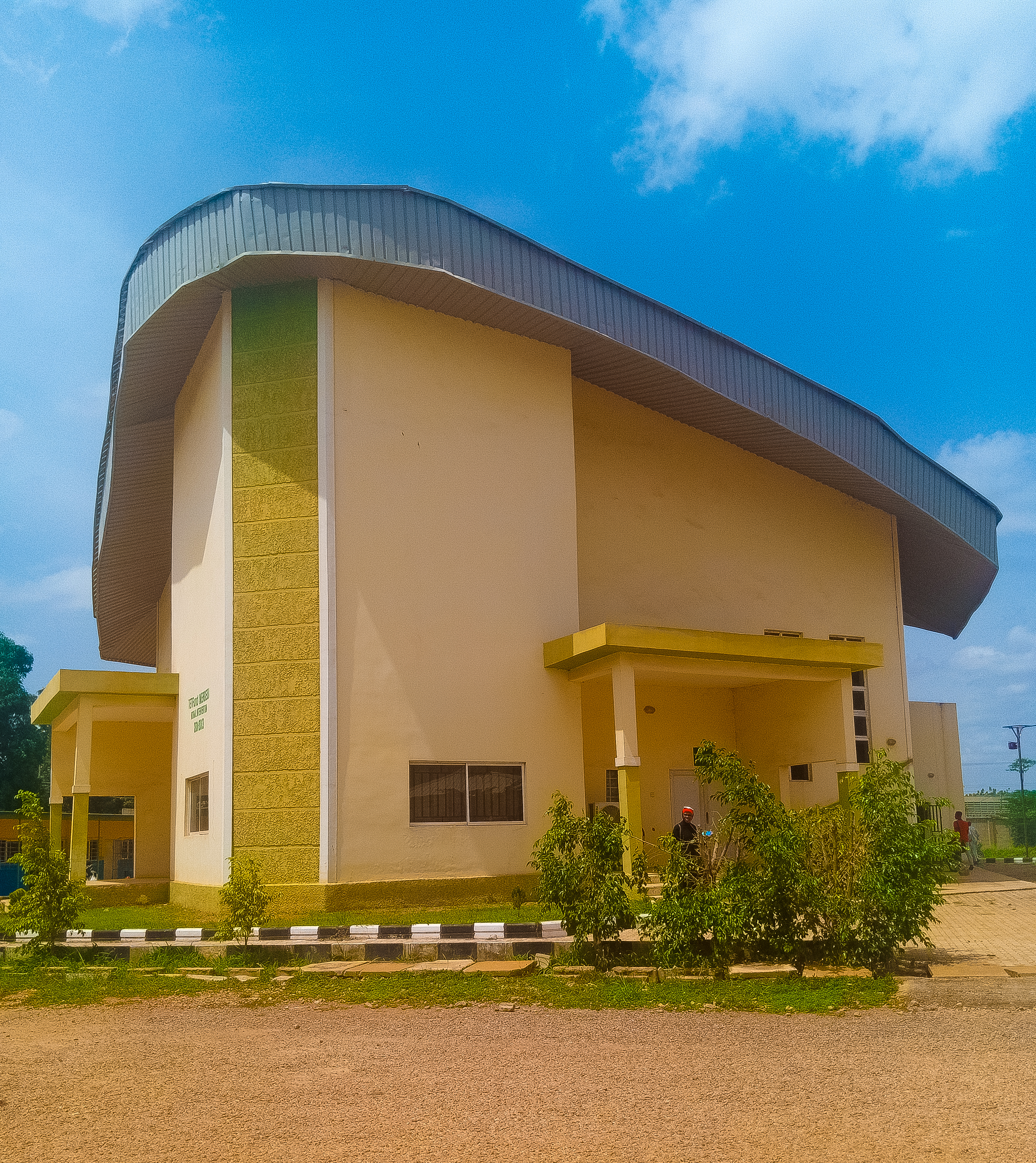
Pharmacy Lecture Theatre

The Faculty of Pharmaceutical Sciences was established in 2012, with the founding dean of the faculty being Prof. Ahmed Tijjani Mora.

It has six departments:

- Department of Pharmacology and Toxicology
- Department of Clinical Pharmacy and Pharmacy Management
- Department of Pharmaceutical and Medicinal Chemistry
- Department of Pharmacognosy and Drug Development
- Department of Pharmaceutics and Industrial Pharmacy
- Department of Pharmaceutical Microbiology and Biotechnology

=== College of Communications, Social & Management Sciences ===
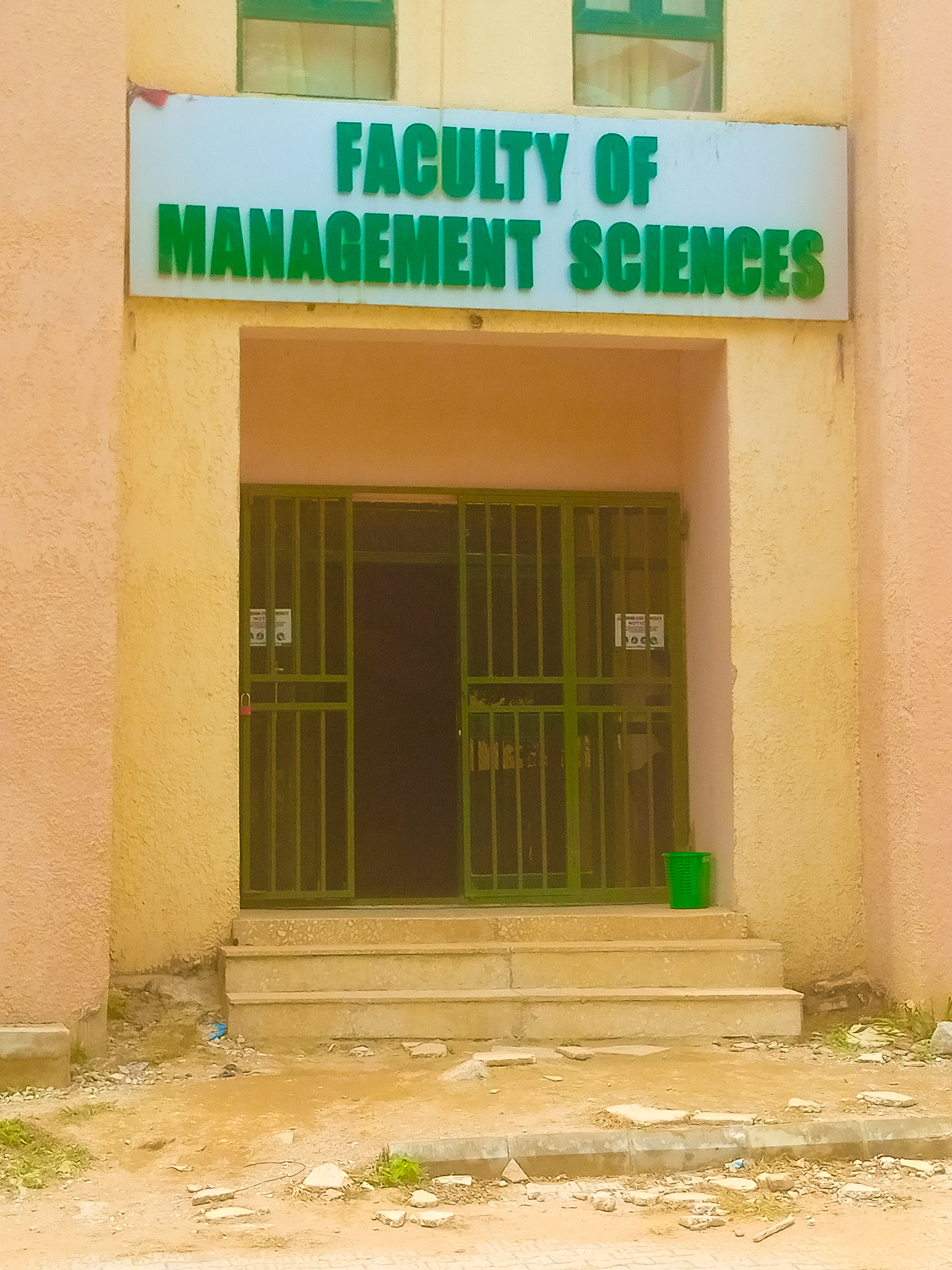
Entrance to Faculty of Management Sciences

The college consists of the following:

=== Faculty of Communication and Media ===
This faculty consists of the following department:

- Mass Communication

=== Faculty of Social Sciences ===
The Faculty of Social Sciences is among the pioneer faculties of the university, established in 2005. It comprises the following departments at the Kaduna Campus:

- Economics
- Political Science
- Sociology
- International relation and diplomacy
- Criminology

=== Faculty of Management Sciences ===
The Faculty of Management Sciences is also among the pioneer faculties of the university, established in 2005. It comprises the following departments at the Kaduna Campus:

- Accounting
- Business Administration
- Banking and Finance
- Entrepreneurship
- Marketing
- Public Administration
- Procurement And Supply Chain Management

=== College of Agricultural & Environmental Sciences ===
The college, located in the Kafanchan campus, consists of:

- Faculty of Environmental Sciences
- Faculty of Agriculture

=== Faculty of Environmental Sciences ===
The Faculty of Environmental Sciences was among the faculties established in 2012, and is one of the two faculties on the Kafanchan Campus. It has four departments:

- Estate Management
- Quantity Surveying
- Environmental Management
- Architecture

=== Faculty of Agriculture ===
The Faculty of Agriculture was among the faculties established in 2012, and is one of the two faculties on the Kafanchan Campus.

It has four departments:

- Agricultural Economics and Extension
- Animal Science
- Crop Science
- Agriculture

=== Faculty of Environmental Sciences ===
The Faculty of Environmental Sciences was among the faculties established in 2012, and is one of the two faculties on the Kafachan Campus. It has four departments:

- Estate Management
- Quantity Surveying
- Environmental Management
- Architecture

== Schools and institutes ==
=== School of Postgraduate Studies ===
The school admits students for postgraduate diploma, master's degree and PhD. The functions of the school are as follows:

- Coordinate postgraduate programmes of the university including planning, coordination, administration and admission into programmes of study.
- Recommend the provision of facilities for postgraduate work, regulation and disbursement of funds for postgraduate activities.
- Enhance the quality of postgraduate instructions and research in the university.
- Publicize the postgraduate activities of the university to attract recognition, financial and other support from governments, industries and other agencies.

The university has four faculties for the postgraduate (PG) programme:

- Faculty of Arts
- Faculty of Science
- Faculty of Social Sciences
- Faculty of Management Sciences.

=== School of Continuing Education and Basic Studies ===
==== College of Basic and Remedial Studies ====
The College of Basic and Remedial Studies has two campuses: the main campus at Maiduguri Road, Kaduna and the other in Kafanchan. The main campus was established in 2004 and the Kafanchan campus in 2012. Basic and Remedial Studies is a pre-degree training programme aimed at producing well-trained candidates from the university's catchment areas and other Nigerians. The programme is essentially for candidates who could not gain university admission through JAMB due to low Unified Tertiary Matriculation Examination (UTME) scores.

The duration of the Basic and Remedial Studies programme is nine months, which is equivalent to one academic session of intensive teaching by qualified teachers.

The main objectives of the Remedial Programme are

- to prepare candidates to remedy their O Levels deficiencies through WAEC and NECO examinations
- to prepare candidates to pass their UTME examination
- to coach candidates to pass their Post UTME examination
- to prepare candidates for the challenges of academic life in university

==== Admission requirements ====
Basic Programme

Candidates for this programme must possess not less than five credits in their WASSCE/SSCE/NECO examinations.

Science: Candidates for the science programme should have credits in English, Mathematics and any other three of the following subjects: Biology, Chemistry, Physics and Geography. The five credits above must have been obtained in not more than two sittings.

Humanities: Candidates for the arts programme should have credits in English, Mathematics and any other three of the following subjects: Economics, Government, History and Literature in English. The five credits above must have been obtained in not more than two sittings.

For both categories, applicants must write the annual JAMB/UTME with relevant subject combination and must obtain the minimum pass mark approved by the Federal Government.

==== Remedial Programme ====
Science: Candidates for this programme must possess a minimum of three credits in not more than one sitting in the following subjects: English Language, Mathematics, Biology, Chemistry, Physics and Geography.

Humanities: Candidates for this programme must possess a minimum of three credits in not more than one sitting in the following subjects: English Language, Mathematics, Economics, Government, History and Literature in English.

Candidates admitted for the Remedial programme are expected to register and pass SSCE or NECO in the subjects they are deficient.

Candidates will not be allowed to register for subjects that have not been attempted at O Level.

=== Arabic-French Preliminary Studies Programme ===
The main objectives of the Arabic-French Preliminary Studies Programme are:

- To prepare candidates to pass their UTME examination.
- To coach candidates to pass their Post UTME examination.
- To prepare candidates for the challenges of academic life in university.

All these are achieved through the provision of qualified, experienced and dedicated lecturers.

Admission requirements For Arabic and French, the admission requirement is at least five credits including English Language in WAEC/NECO examinations in not more than two sittings.

In addition to the above requirements, all prospective candidates must register and sit for the Unified Tertiary Matriculation Examination (UTME).

== Gallery ==
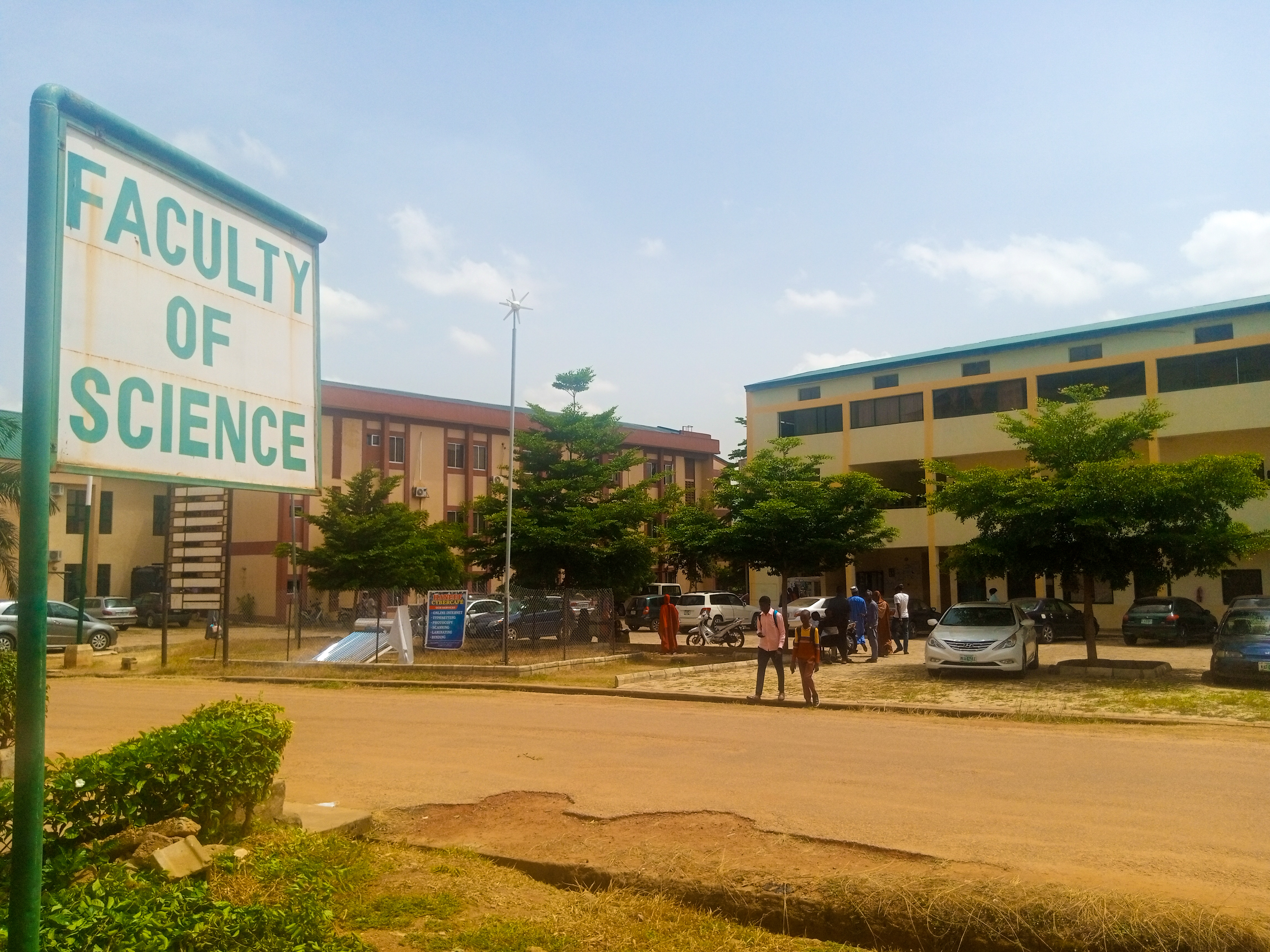
Faculty of Science

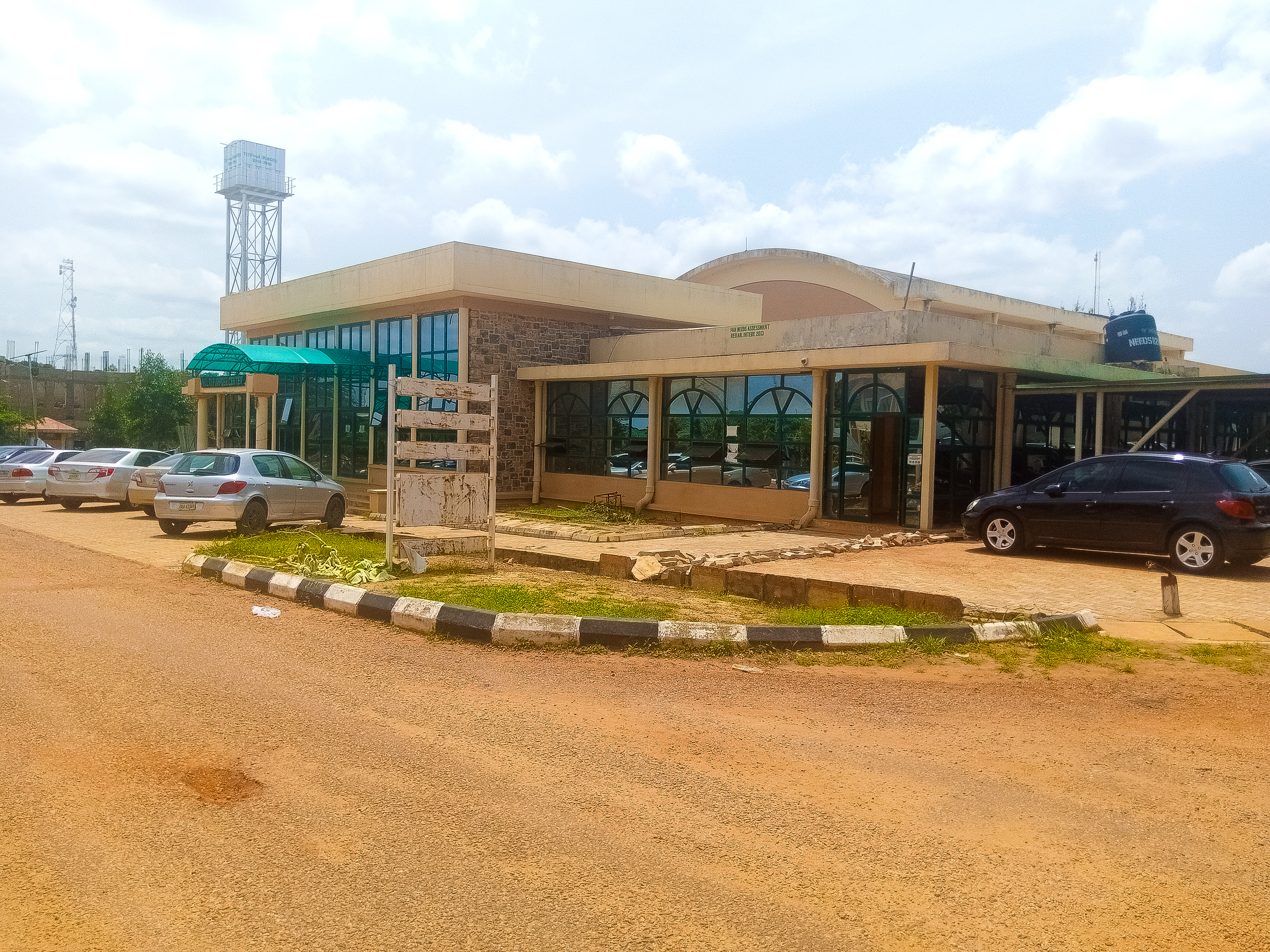
KASU Multipurpose Center

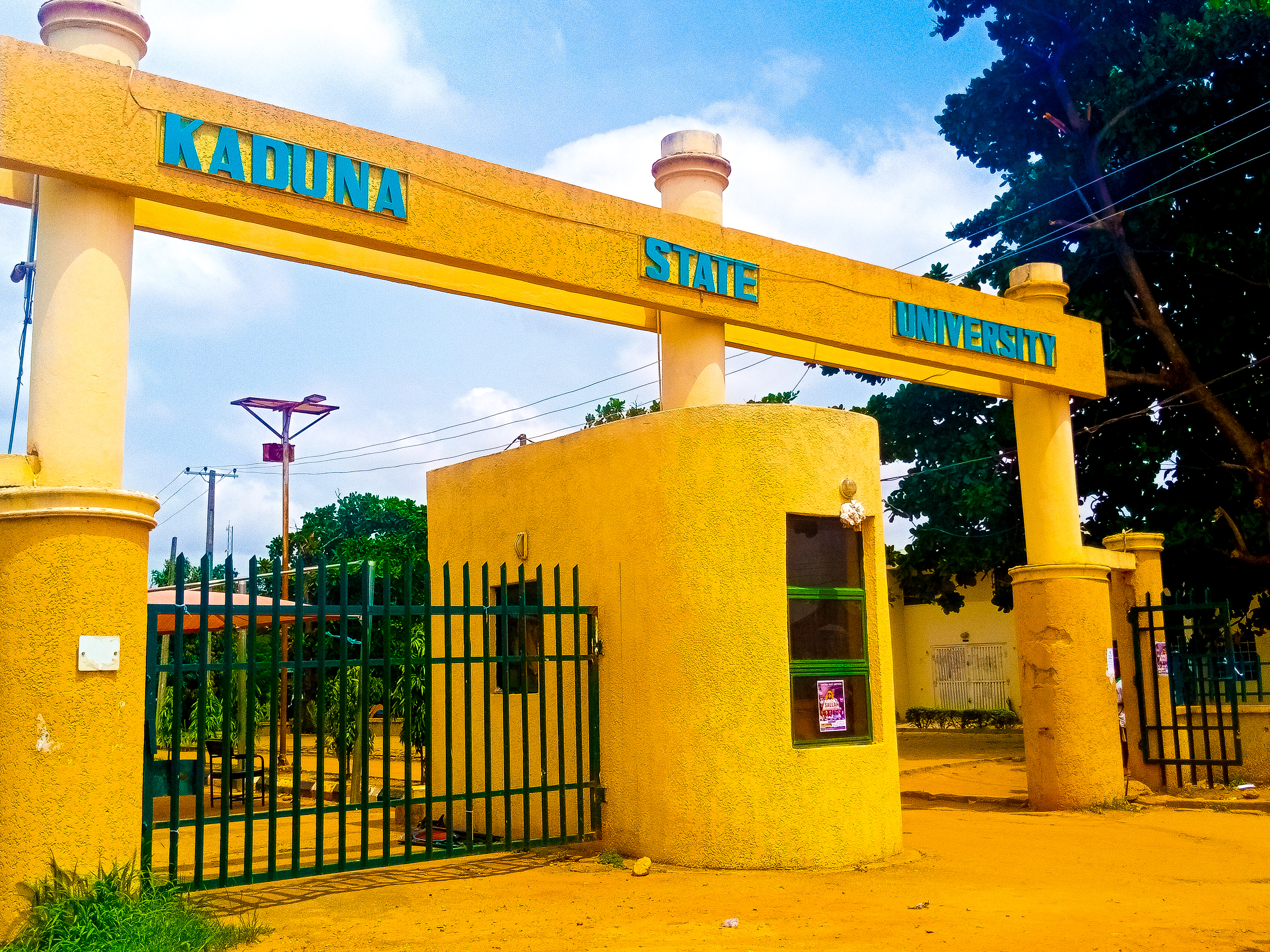
University gate

== Notable people ==
Alumni

- Hafsat Mohammed Baba
- Nasir El-Rufai
- Zainab Shamsuna Ahmed
- Alhaji Muhammad Maigari Dingyadi
- Malam Mele Kyari

Holders of honorary doctorate degrees

- Muhammadu Buhari
- Aliko Dangote
