= Bashir Zubairu =

Nigerian politician (born 1968)

Honourable Bashir Zubairu

Member of the 10th House of Representatives
- Incumbent
- Assumed office June 10, 2023
- Constituency: Birnin-Gwari/Giwa Federal Constituency

Personal details
- Born: 28 May 1968 (age 57) Kaduna State
- Party: All Progressive Congress (APC)
- Occupation: Politician

Bashir Zubairu is a Nigerian politician. He serves as the Federal Representative representing Birnin-Gwari/Giwa Federal Constituency of Kaduna State in the 10th National Assembly. He has sponsored 7 bills and moved many motions at the National Assembly.

== Political career ==
He entered politics and held the position of Speaker in the Kaduna State House of Assembly during Governor Ahmad Muhammad Makarfi's administration. His role in the state legislature involved overseeing legislative processes and contributing to policy-making at the state level.

He won his House of Representatives seat with 41,023 votes. He was elected to the 10th National Assembly in 2023 under the platform of the All Progressives Congress (APC).

In addition to his political career, Zubairu holds the traditional title of Ciroman Birnin Gwari, a position that signifies leadership and cultural recognition within Kaduna Metropolis.
