= Aminu Salihu Mikailu =

Mika'ilu Aminu Salihu
- Born: April, 1956
- Citizenship: Nigeria
- Employer: University of Ilorin
- Title: Professor

Aminu S. Mikailu, also known as Mika'ilu A. S. or Mika'ilu Aminu Salihu, is a professor and a Nigerian academician (born on April 4, 1956). He is an accounting educator and university administrator, having served as Vice-Chancellor at both Usmanu Danfodiyo University, Sokoto (1999 – 2004); and Kaduna State University (2004 – 2006); and Nassarawa State University (2013 – 2014). He had also served as Chairman of the Governing Council of the Federal College of Education (Technical), Omoku, Rivers State.

His professional interests span across accounting, economics, industrial management, and corporate social responsibility, with a particular focus on the religious aspects of business from an Islamic perspective.

== Career ==
The Federal Government has appointed Prof. Aminu Salihu Mikailu, the new Pro -Chancellor and Chairman, Governing Council of the University of Ilorin.
