= Muhammad Tanko =

Nigerian professor (born 1969)

Muhammad Tanko (born in 1969) is a Nigerian professor, academic, former vice chancellor of Kaduna State University (KASU). and is the current vice chancellor of Mewar International University Nigeria.

== Early life and education ==
Muhammad was born in 1969 in the Kawo area of Kaduna state. He was educated at Bayero University Kano where graduated with bachelor of science in accounting in 1991, Master degree in accounting and PhD from Ahmadu Bello University, Zaria.

== Career ==
Tanko was former deputy vice chancellor of Kaduna State University. In January, 2017 Nasir el-Rufai, Governor of Kaduna State appointed him as vice chancellor.
