= Sokoto State University =

Public university in Sokoto State, Nigeria

Coordinates: 12.94229°N 5.19055°E

- Motto: ﻛﻞ ﺷﻲﺀ ﻳﺒﺪﺃ ﻫﻨﺎ! (Arabic)
- Motto in English: It all begins here!
- Type: Public (state-owned)
- Established: 2009
- Affiliations: NUC
- Chancellor: Alh. Nuhu Sanusi, Emir of Dutse
- Vice-Chancellor: Prof. Nuhu Yaqub (2013 - 2017); Prof. Sani Muhammad Dangogo (2017 - 2022); Prof. Bashir Garba (MFR) (2022 - 2024); Prof. MB Yerima; (2024 - present)
- Location: Sokoto, Sokoto State, Nigeria
- Campus: [[Urban area|Urban]]
- Website: ssu.edu.ng

Sokoto State University (SSU) is located in Sokoto, Sokoto State in Nigeria. It was established in 2009 under Aliyu Wamakko administration.

== History ==
Arising from the insatiable quest of the people of the state for education and excellence, the idea of establishing the Sokoto State University was conceived by the then Sokoto State Governor Aliyu Wamakko when he established the Sokoto State University Implementation Committee in 2008.

The committee was charged with the responsibility of:

- Planning for the structure and facilities for the effective running of the university,
- seeking for and obtaining approval from the Federal Government for Sokoto state to run its own university aside, Usmanu Danfodiyo University, which is Federal Government owned and in which the indigenes of the state were marginally placed over the years arising from the Nigerian federal character principle; and
- establishing the Sokoto State University School of Developmental Studies with the sole aim of preparing students, a one-year pre-degree programme before enrolling into the university.

The approval was granted in 2009.

== Objectives ==
- To provide for the indigenes of Sokoto state access to higher education for self-reliance.
- To promote, preserve and propagate the social and rich cultural heritage of the people of the state.
- To identify and produce man-power that can and will meet specific needs of the state.
- To encourage the effective application of higher education to the needs of the state through research and consultancy.
- To encourage and promote advancement of learning and to hold out all persons without discrimination of race, creed or political conviction.
- To engage in any other activity of a growing university.

== Courses Offered ==
- Arabic Studies
- Biochemistry
- Biotechnology
- Biology
- Chemistry
- Computer Science
- Economics
- Education Economics
- Education and Biology
- Education and Chemistry
- Education and Computer Science
- Education and Mathematics
- Education and Physics
- Educational Management
- English Language
- Geography
- Guidance and Counseling
- Hausa
- History
- Industrial Chemistry
- Industrial Mathematics
- Information Technology
- Integrated Science
- Islamic Studies
- Mathematics
- Microbiology
- Physics
- Plant Biology
- Political Science
- Sociology
- Statistic
