= Abdullahi Musa Ashafa =

Nigerian Academic

Abdullahi Ashafa

Vice-Chancellor of Kaduna State University
- Incumbent
- Assumed office 23rd of June 2022
- Preceded by: Yohanna Tella

Personal details
- Born: Abdullahi Musa Ashafa
- Education: Nigerian Defence Academy
- Profession: Academic

Abdullahi Musa Ashafa is a professor of Diplomatic History and The Acting Vice-chancellor of Kaduna State University. (KASU)

== Career ==
Ashafa served as the Dean of Postgraduate Studies at Kaduna State University (KASU) and held the position of Deputy Vice-Chancellor (Academic) in 2018. He was also a previously lecturer at the Nigerian Defence Academy in Kaduna and worked as Chief Administrative Officer under the Special Adviser to the President of Nigeria on Inter-Party Relations. On 23 June 2022, he was appointed Acting Vice-Chancellor of KASU by the university's 5th Governing Council, following the end of the tenure of his predecessor, Yohanna Tella. Ashafa's appointment is for a five-year term.
