= Hafsat Mohammed Baba =

Nigerian politician

Hajiya Hafsat Mohammed Baba
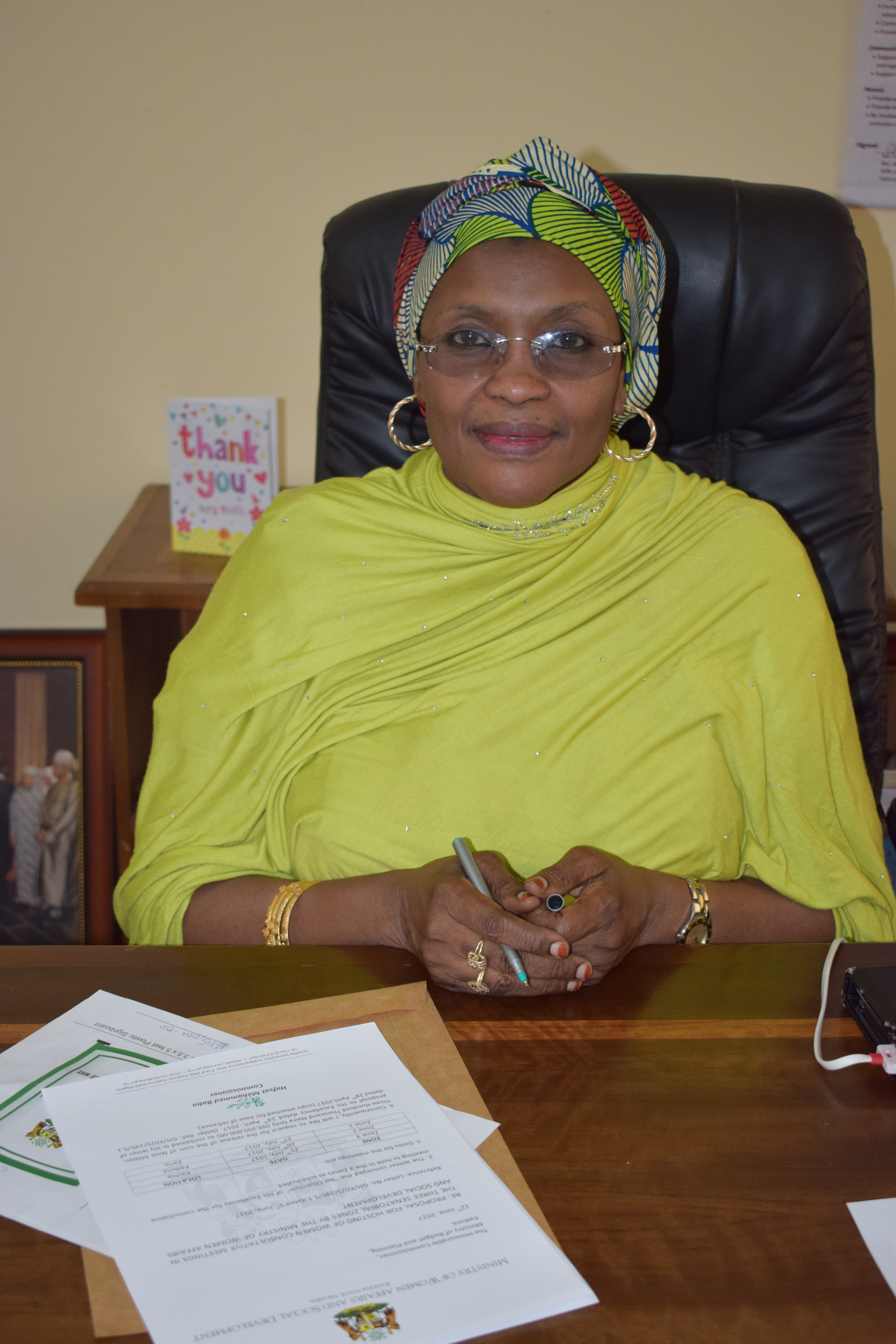

Kaduna State Commissioner for Human Services and Social Development
- In office July 2019 – May 2023
- Governor: Nasir El-Rufai

Kaduna State Commissioner for Women Affairs
- In office July 2015 – January 2019
- Governor: Nasir El-Rufai

Personal details
- Born: Hafsat Mohammed Baba; 17 July 1957 (age 69) Hadejia, Jigawa State, Nigeria
- Party: All Progressives Congress (APC)
- Spouse: Hassan Baba
- Children: 5; Umma, Ahmed, Amrahtu (deceased), Yusuf, Hauwa
- Education: Kaduna Polytechnic; Queen Amina College; Kaduna State University
- Occupation: Politician
- Profession: Politics; Philanthropy; Women Rights Activism; Child's Rights Activism

Hafsat Mohammed Baba (born 17 July 1957), is the former Commissioner for Human Services and Social Development in Kaduna State. She was reappointed Commissioner Human Services and Social Development in July 2019 after serving as Commissioner of Women Affairs and Social Development from 2017 to April 2019. The new portfolio meant the erstwhile Ministry of Women Affairs and Social Development was expanded to include Human Services, Youth Development and Arts & Culture which had hitherto been in other Ministries.

== Biography ==
Hafsat M. Baba was born on 17 July 1957 in Hadejia (now in Jigawa State) of Katsina parentage. She began her primary school in Sokoto from where she proceeded to Queen of Apostles College (now Queen Amina College), as her father who was a health officer was transferred to Kaduna in the early 70s. Hafsat attended the Kaduna Polytechnic for tertiary education, earning National Diploma and Higher National Diploma certificates in Catering and Hotel Management. She has since added Postgraduate Diplomas (PgD) in International Relations (Kaduna Polytechnic) and Peace & Conflict Resolution at the National Open University of Nigeria (NOUN)

== Work ==
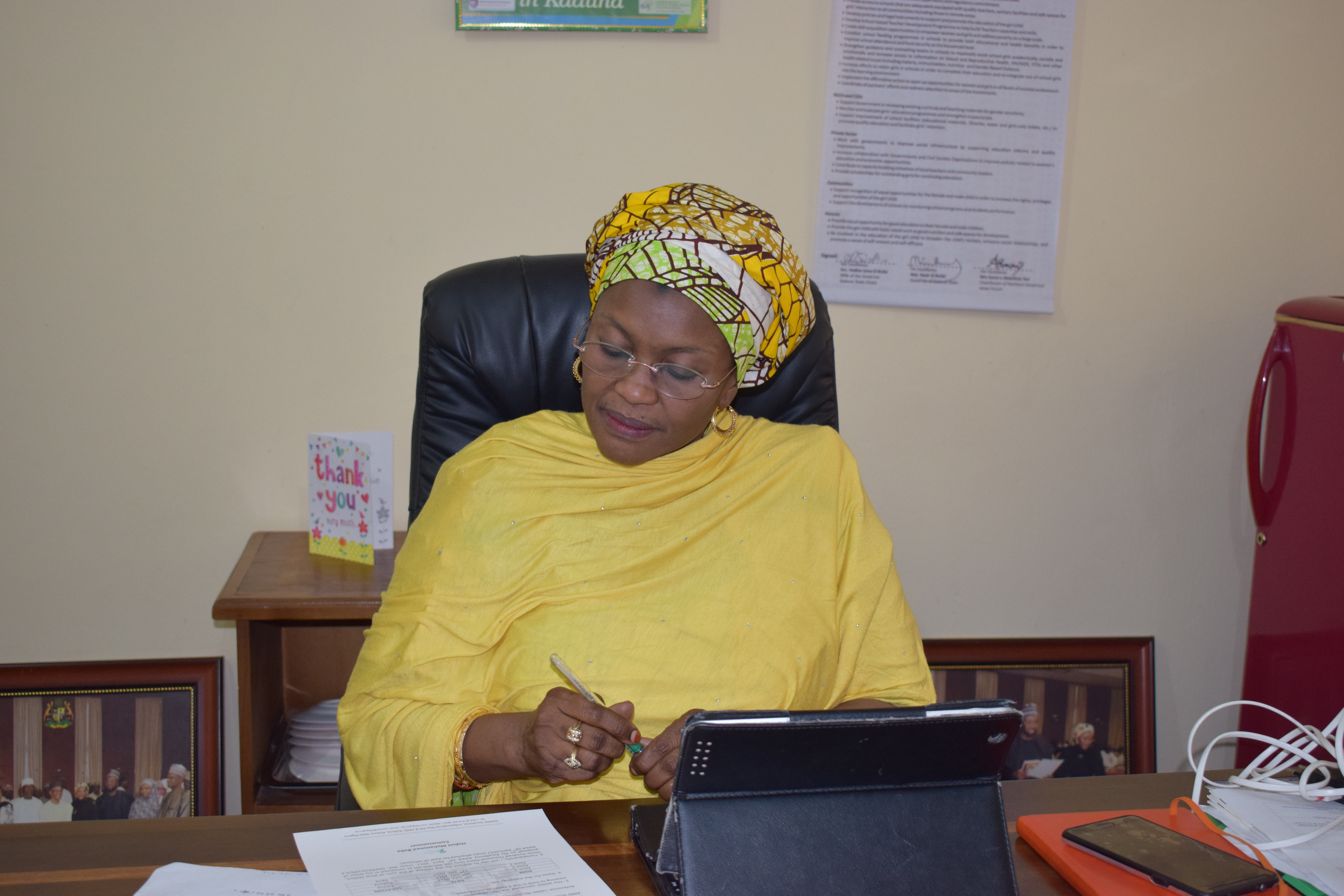
Hajiya Hafsat Mohammed Baba on her desk as the Commissioner for Women Affairs of Kaduna State.

Beginning work with the Kaduna Ministry of Health as part of her service year, Hafsat started service of the State as Officer 1 at the New General Hospital (Now Barau Dikko Hospital), Kaduna. She went on to work in the Government House, Kaduna; National Teachers' Institute and Albarka Airlines from where, in 2002 she moved into the social/advocacy sector. Her experience in the social and non-governmental sector saw her serving in various positions beginning as State Coordinator, Women and Youth Opinion Leaders Forum, Kaduna; and as Project Coordinator, Jam'iyyar Matan Arewa, Kaduna; both between 2002 and 2006. From 2006, in the National Council for Women Society, Kaduna, she served as Research Coordinator until 2010, and as Assistant Secretary till her appointment as Commissioner for Women Affairs by Governor Nasir Ahmad El-Rufa'i. Until her appointment, she was Consultant Councillor on HIV/AIDS for the BBC World Service Trust Radio Programme from 2006 and Gender Advocacy Consultant for the UNDP from 2013. Hafsat had founded the Global Initiative for Women and Children (GIWAC) in Kaduna in 2004 and coordinated same ever since.

== Politics ==
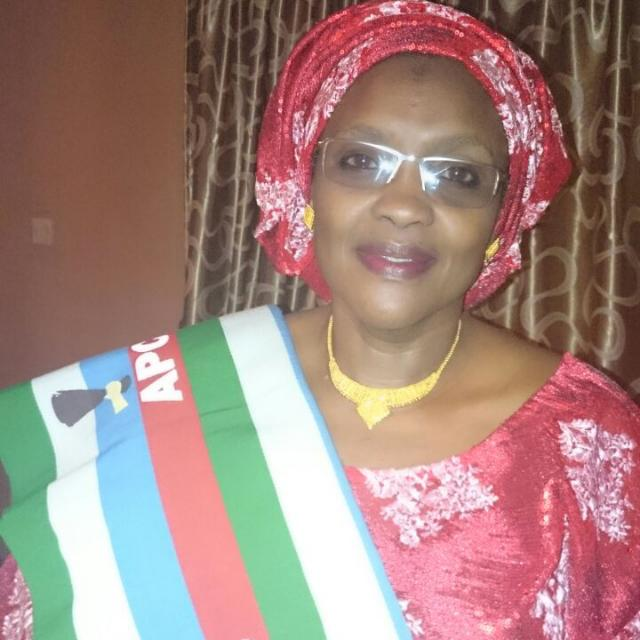
Hajiya Hafsat M. Baba dons an APC branded attire

Hafsat is a grassroots politician who began political career with the defunct APP/ANPP as a delegate representing Unguwan Sarki Ward from 1999 to 2002, and rising to become Treasurer of the Presidential Campaign Committee, North West Zone while aspiring to become a Member of the Federal House of Representatives for Kaduna North in 2007. She became the Chairperson of Kaduna State ANPP in 2012. After serving as a member of the Technical Committee of ACN, she was the National Women Leader between 2011 and 2013, and a member of the ACN Convention Committee. On the merger of political parties to form the APC, Hafsat served as the Secretary of the APC National Peace and Reconciliatory Committee, North East and Member of the APC Committee on the conduct of Governorship Primaries in Adamawa State; all in 2014. Hajiya aspired to represent Kaduna North in the Federal House of Representatives once again in 2015. Also politically, Hafsat was a Founding Member and Vice President (North) of the Women in Politics Forum.

== Non-governmental activities ==
Hafsat in her social activism and humanitarian work, has participated in a lot of trainings, conferences and workshops. Training on various issues bordering on Women and Women's rights, Social Rights, Gender Equality, Health and HIV/AIDS, Child's Right, Leadership, Social Media, advocacy trainings amongst others. These trainings were both locally and internationally, including those organised by UNFPA, USAID, OXFAM, IRI, DFID, NURHI (Bill and Melinda Gates Foundation), British Council, NIPSS etc.

== Awards and memberships ==
Hafsat has been awarded on numerous occasions by several bodies. She is a recipient of the Ambassador of Peace Icon of the Middle Belt Youth Organisations Award. She was awarded for her outstanding contribution to the success of the ENR programme in Kaduna in 2012 as well as the NURHI demand generation activities in Kaduna in 2015. Hafsat is a recipient of an Award for exceptional leadership by VORi and also by the Women Advancement Forum MDG in South Africa in 2013. The BBC and IFESH-USAID also presented her awards in recognition of her exemplary contribution to programmes by the organisations, as councillor on HIV/AIDS and as part of the Conflict Management and Mitigation Regional Council Trainings respectively. She had received awards from the NCWS and the Initiative for Social Sector Strategy (ISSS) in 2006. Hafsat retains membership in a number of organisations. These include: Global Initiative for Women and Children (GIWAC), Women Interfaith Council (WIC), Child Protection Network (CPN), Women Democratic Network (WDN) Washington DC, Women for Equity and Fairness in Nigeria, Women in Politics Forum (WIPF), Advocacy Core Group (ACG NURHI), Child Spacing Advocacy Team (C-SAT), and Movement for Better Future.

== Projects ==
Hafsat has executed a number of projects which include NURHI's Family Planning/Child Spacing Projects; Society for Family Health (SFH)'s Roll Back Malaria Programme; the European Union (EU)'s Water and Sanitation Project; Kaduna State Action Committee on HIV/AIDS (KADSACA's) Fund I and II; Coordinating the Japanese Embassy's Micro credit for conflict affected areas in Plateau and Kaduna States; for the Centre for Integrated Health Programme (CiHP), Educational Support for Orphans & Children and Skills Acquisition for Women Living with HIV/AIDS. She was also a beneficiary of the World Bank HIV/AIDS assisted project in collaboration with the Kaduna State Action Committee on HIV/AIDS. These projects have a direct impact on the society and these are the core functions of the Ministry of Women Affairs and Social Development.

== Personal life ==
Hafsat is happily married and blessed with five children.
