= Hussaini Muhammad Jallo =

Nigerian politician

Jallo Hussaini Mohammed is a Kaduna based Nigerian politician. He is currently the member representing Igabi federal constituency of Kaduna State in the 10th National Assembly.
