= Ezzeldin Muktar Abdurahman =

Nigerian Professor

- Born: 18 November 1957 (age 68); Egypt

Academic background
- Education: Ahmadu Bello University

Academic work
- Discipline: Pharmaceutical Science
- Sub-discipline: Pharmacognocy

Ezzeldin Muktar is an academian and a professor of pharmacognosy and drug development. He is a former substantive vice chancellor of Bauchi State University.

== Early life and education ==
Muktar was born on 18 November 1957 in Egypt. In Cairo he attended Banha Primary school and Banha Secondary school. He received his Bachelor of Pharmaceutical Sciences from the University of Cairo (1980). He attained his Msc (1986), Phd (1998) and MBA (1999) in Pharmacognocy from Ahmadu Bello University (ABU).

== Career ==
He was dean of Pharmaceutical Sciences of Ahmadu Bello University, Zaria. He was also a vice chancellor for Kaduna State University. He is a member of seven professional bodies both within and outside Nigeria. He is currently the president of Nigeria Society of Pharmacognosy.

== Awards ==
He was awarded Kaduna State PSN, Merit award (1994), PANS ABU Merit Award, and also Ahmadu Bello University Merit Award (1995).

== Publications ==
He has over fifty publications he authored and co-authored.
