= Lawal Bilbis =

Nigerian academic

Lawal Suleiman Bilbis

Vice chancellor of the Usmanu Danfodiyo University
- Incumbent
- Assumed office 15 July 2019
- Preceded by: Professor Abdullahi Zuru

Vice Chancellor of the Federal University, Birnin Kebbi
- In office 2013–2015
- Preceded by: established
- Succeeded by: S.B Shehu

Personal details
- Born: 1961 (age 65) Bilbis Village Tsafe, Zamfara State
- Education: Usmanu Danfodiyo University, University of Essex

Lawal Suleiman Bilbis (born 1961) is an educator and lecturer in the department of Biochemistry at the Usmanu Danfodiyo University appointed as the Vice chancellor of the University in July 2019, replacing Abdullahi Zuru. He previously served as the deputy chancellor academics at Usmanu Danfodiyo University and had served as the pioneer vice chancellor of the Federal University, Birnin Kebbi in 2013.

He is an indigene of Tsafe, at Magazu Village in Zamfara State, Nigeria.

== Education ==
He holds a B.Sc. of Biochemistry from the Usmanu Danfodiyo University, Sokoto in 1986 and PhD of Biological Chemistry from the University of Essex, England in 1992.

He became a Professor of Biochemistry in 2002 at the Usmanu Danfodiyo University.

== Career ==
He started working as a clinical Biochemistry at the General Hospital, Gusau before joining academics.

=== Academic career ===
He began as an assistant lecturer in 1988 at the Usmanu Danfodiyo University and had served as Head of Department of Biochemistry, dean in the Science Faculty. He was also deputy chancellor academics and the Director University Development Office in UDUS.

== Publications ==
- Studies of prokallikreins from sheep pancreas and kidney. Ph. D. University of Essex, 1992, Academic theses. Book, Archival Material, OCLC 27415599
- Antioxidants in the service of man, Series Title: Inaugural lecture (Usmanu Danfodiyo University), 16th. Series: Inaugural lecture (Usmanu Danfodiyo University), 16th. Book, Lawal Suleman Bilbis. 16, Central Coordinating Committee for University Inaugural Lecturers and Seminars, Sixteenth inaugural lecture, 2015, ISBN 9789789007332, 9789007337, OCLC 1028238627
