= Fausat Adebola Ibikunle =

Commissioner of Kaduna State

Fausat Adebola Abikunle

Ministry of Housing and Urban Developments (Kaduna State)
- Incumbent
- Assumed office 2019
- Governor: Nasir Ahmad el-Rufai

Personal details
- Education: Ahmadu Bello University

Fausat Adebola Ibikunle is the commissioner of the Ministry of Housing and Urban Developments and was the general manager of the Kaduna State Urban Planning & Development Authority (KASUPDA). She was appointed by the Governor of Kaduna State Mallam Nasir Ahmad el-Rufai.

== Early life and education ==
Fausat was born in Doka district of Kaduna State. She graduated from Ahmadu Bello University with a bachelor's degree in architecture in 1983.

== Career ==
In 1984, she worked with the Ministry of Defence, and later the Federal Capital Development Authority where in 2005 she became assistant director in the Public Buildings Department. In 2007, Fausat became deputy director in the Health and Human Services Secretariat in the Federal Capital Territory. Later on she became commissioner of Housing and Urban Development. She is currently the General manager of the Urban Planning and Development Authority (KASUPDA) of Kaduna State.

== See also ==
- Ministries of Kaduna State
