= Yusuf Ibrahim Zailani =

Speaker of the Kaduna State House of Assembly

- Citizenship: Nigerian
- Occupation: Politician
- Political party: APC

Yusuf Ibrahim Zailani is a Nigerian politician and former Speaker of Kaduna State House of Assembly. He is a member of ruling All Progressives Congress representing Igabi West, state constituency in the Kaduna State House of Assembly and was elected speaker on 25 February 2020.

== Political career ==
Zailani was nominated for the position of speaker by Hon. Suleiman Ibrahim Dabo representing Zaria City constituency and seconded by Bako Kantiyok representing Zonkwa state constituency following the sudden resignation of the former speaker of the assembly, Aminu Abdullahi Shagali on ‘personal grounds’. He was re-elected as a member of Kaduna State House of Assembly in 2023.

He contested for Kaduna Central Senatorial seat which he lost to former Senator Shehu Sani in the 2026 party primaries.
