= Usmanu Danfodiyo University =

University in Sokoto, Nigeria

Usmanu Danfodiyo University, Sokoto
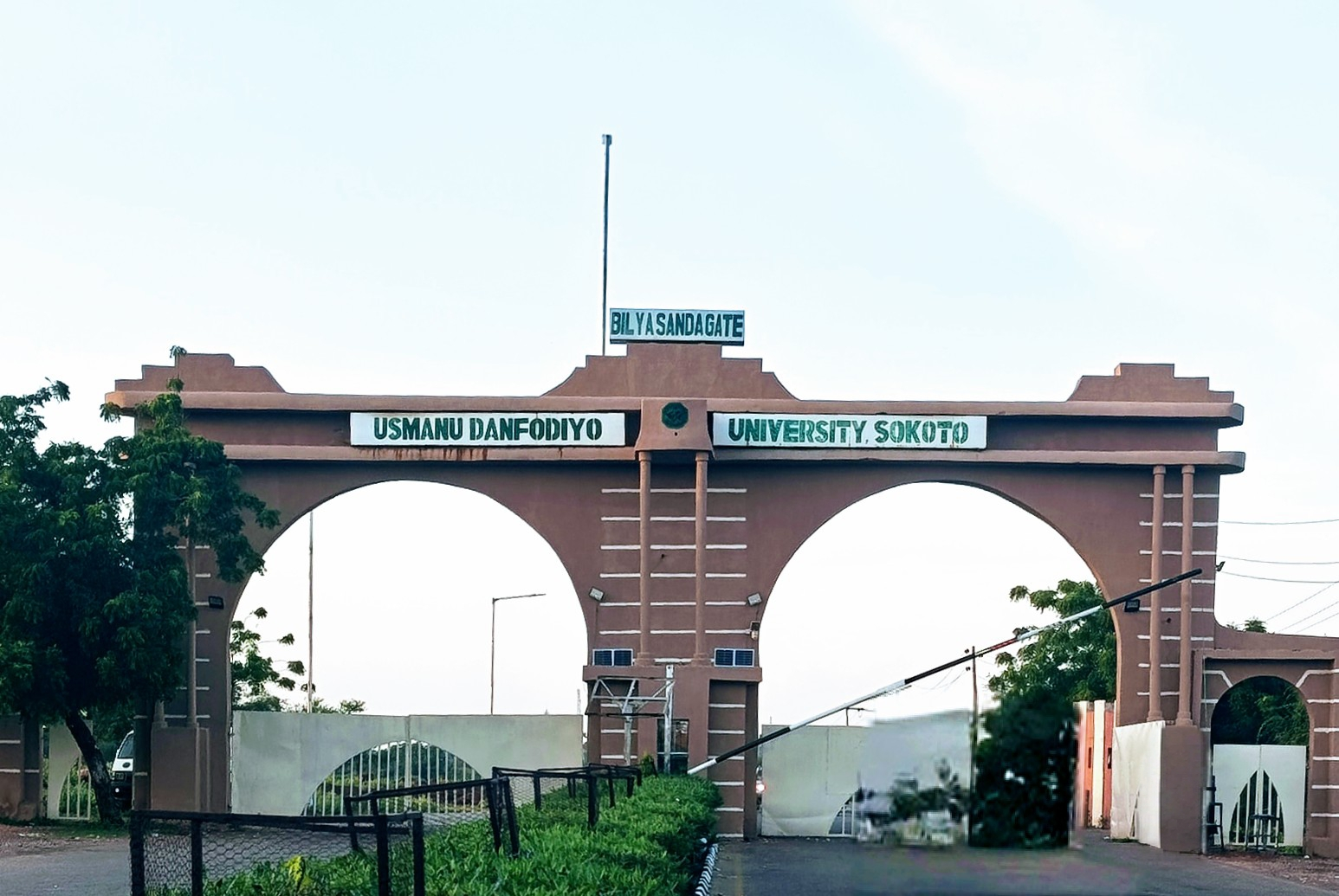
- Other name: Danfodiyo
- Former name: University of Sokoto
- Motto: The most peaceful university in Nigeria
- Motto in English: 'Read'
- Type: Public
- Established: 1975
- Academic affiliations: Association of African Universities (AAU); Association of Commonwealth Universities (ACU); Academic Staff Union of Universities (ASUU); National Universities Commission (NUC)
- Chancellor: Rilwan Akiolu, Oba of Lagos
- Vice-Chancellor: Bashir Garba
- Location: Sokoto, Sokoto State, Nigeria; 13°07′37″N 5°12′18″E
- Campus: Urban (main campus)
- Colours: Pink and Green
- Website: udusok.edu.ng

Usmanu Danfodiyo University, Sokoto (UDUS) is a public research university located in the city of Sokoto, in north-western Nigeria. It is one of the initial twelve universities founded in Nigeria by the federal government in 1975. The university is named after the famous Usman dan Fodio, the founder of the Sokoto Caliphate.

== Academics ==
Udusok is a four, five and six-years degree-awarding institution that also runs associate degrees and remedial programmes. The university has a standard medical program and University Teaching Hospital. The university has fifteen (15) faculties spread across three campuses.

The main campus houses Ten (10) faculties namely; Agriculture, Arts, Arabic and Islamic Studies, Education, Engineering and Environmental Design, Law, Life Sciences, Management Science, social sciences, Physical and Computing Sciences, Center For Entrepreneurship Development, Center for peace studies and Center for Energy research and training. The university senate, the main library complex (Abdullahi Fodiyo Library Complex) and the School of Postgraduate Studies are also located at the main campus with over 4500 seating capacity and information resources both online and offline data bases. the present university librarian is Prof. A.K. Nuhu.

The annex campus ( City Campus) hosts the faculty of Veterinary medicine and Veterinary Teaching Hospital, the Centre for Islamic Studies and the school of Remedial and Basic Studies popularly known as School of Matriculation Studies.

A third campus houses the university's teaching hospital, faculty of Pharmaceutical Sciences, college of Health Sciences, faculty of Dentistry, and faculty of Medical Laboratory Science.

== Faculties ==
The university has Fifteen (15) faculties:

- Faculty of Agriculture
- Faculty of Arts
- Faculty of Arabic and Islamic studies
- Faculty of Education and Extension Service
- Faculty of Engineering and Environmental Design
- College of Health Science
- Faculty of Physical and Computing Sciences
- Faculty of Law
- Faculty of Management Sciences
- Faculty of Pharmaceutical Sciences
- Faculty of Chemical and Life Sciences
- Faculty of Social Sciences
- Faculty of Veterinary Medicine
- School of Medical Laboratory Scientist
- Faculty of Dentistry

== Administration ==
A chancellor is a ceremonial head of Usmanu Danfodiyo University, while the vice-chancellor is the chief executive officer and Chief academic officer. The vice-chancellor is usually appointed for a period of five-year, non-renewable term. The current vice-chancellor, is Professor Bashir Garba. In Usman Danfodiyo University a young Nigerian lady recently made history as she became the first female president of the Student Union Government (SUG) body in a tertiary institution situated in the northern region of the country (Nigeria) According to reports by WomenAfrica.com, the student identified as Amina Yahaya emerged as the president of the students union body in the Usman Danfodiyo University, Sokoto, this makes her the first female to achieve the feat in over three decades. Yahaya had previously occupied the office of the vice-president of the sug, before the president was removed.

=== Notable administrators ===
- Lawal Bilbis
- Tijjani Muhammad-Bande
- Aminu Salihu Mikailu

== Holders of Honorary Degree ==
- Alh. Aminu Dantata-Business Mogul and Philanthropist
- Alh. Aliko Dangote- Business Mogul
- Alh. Bola Tinubu- Politician, Former Governor Of Lagos State and current President of The Federal Republic of Nigeria
- Alh. Attahiru Bafarawa- Politician and Former Governor of Sokoto State

== Notable alumni ==
- Tajudeen Abbas, Current Speaker of the House of Representatives of Nigeria
- Mohammed Hassan Abdullahi, Nigerian lawyer and politician, former Minister of State Science and Technology
- Ahmad Aliyu, Doctor, Former First Executive Secretary of Nigeria Police Trust Fund and the Current Governor of Sokoto State
- Adamu Baba-Kutigi, physicist
- Mohammed Umar Bago, the Current Executive Governor of Niger State
- Atiku Bagudu, former Senator and former Governor of Kebbi State and current Minister of Budget and Economic Planning
- Abdulrasheed Bawa, Economist and Detective, former Chairman Nigeria's Economic and Financial Crimes Commission
- Nasir Idris, Former National Chairman of the National Union of Teachers (NUT) and now a sitting Governor of Kebbi State, Nigeria.
- Abubakar Malami (SAN), lawyer, a senior advocate of Nigeria, politician, and Nigeria's former attorney general and Minister of Justice
- Abba Sayyadi Ruma, a former Federal Ministry of Agriculture and Rural Development in the late president Umar Musa Yaradua's Government
- Aminu Abdullahi Shagali, politician and businessman, and former speaker of Kaduna State House of Assembly.
- Aminu Tambuwal, former Speaker of the House of Representatives, former Governor of Sokoto State and current Senator for Sokoto South
- Isatou Touray, politician, activist, and social reformer, former Gambian Minister of Trade in the Barrow's cabinet and the current Minister of Health and Social Welfare.
- Abdulmumini Kabir Usman, the current Emir of Katsina, Katsina State
- Mahmood Yakubu, professor, Chairman of the Nigeria's Independent National Electoral Commission

== Stakeholders ==
- TETFund
- Federal Ministry of Education
- National Universities Commission

== See also ==
- List of Islamic educational institutions
- List of universities in Nigeria
