= Kaduna State House of Assembly =

- 10th Kaduna State House of Assembly

Type
- Type: Unicameral
- Term limits: 4 years

History
- Founded: 1914
- New session started: 2023

Leadership
- Speaker of the Assembly: The Right Honorable Yusuf Liman Dahiru, APC since 2023
- Deputy Speaker: The Right Honorable Magaji Henry Danjuma, APC since 2023
- Leader of the House: Ahmed Mohammed Chokali, APC since 2023

Structure
- Seats: 34
- Length of term: 4 years

Elections
- Last election: 2023

Meeting place
- Coronation Crescent, Independence Way; Kaduna State

Website
- Kaduna State House of Assembly

The Kaduna State House of Assembly is the legislature of Kaduna State. The Kaduna State House of Assembly in the Fourth Nigerian Republic on 3 June 1999 which led to the formation of the first assembly whole life span democratically ended on 3 June 2003. The second assembly commenced on 6 June 2003 after the national election.

== Building ==
It is based at Lugard Hall, it houses the Lugard Memorial Council Chamber (Northern Nigeria Council of Chiefs) and The Kaduna State House of Assembly, which is a branch of the Government of Kaduna State, it formerly served as the legislative house of the defunct Northern Nigeria (1954-1967) and the British Colonial government of Nigeria (1914-1954) where all legislative decisions and laws for the governance of the region emanated. Named after the then Governor General of Nigeria Sir Frederick Lugard.

== Composition ==
The assembly is made up of the speaker, his deputy and the representative of various state constituencies on a single vote basis. It is a unicameral body with 34 members elected into the 34 state constituencies. These legislators represent the 23 local government council in the state.

=== Principal Officers ===
Office	Party	Name	District
Speaker	APC	Yusuf Liman	Makera
Deputy Speaker	APC	Henry Magaji	Kagarko
Majority Leader	APC	Ahmad Chokali	Zaria
