= List of universities in Nigeria =

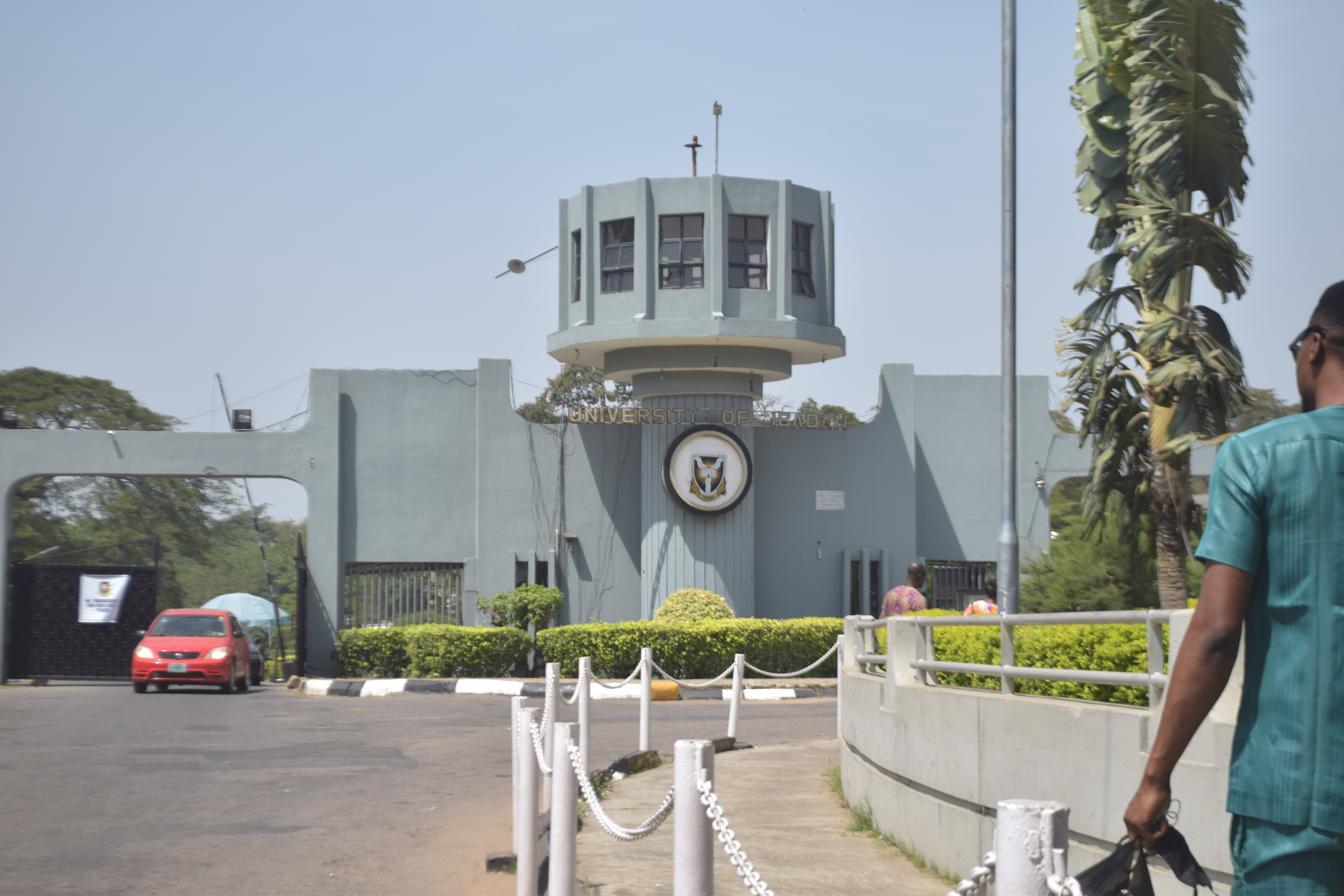
University of Ibadan, main gate

This is a list of universities in Nigeria. Nigeria is organised into 36 states and the Federal Capital Territory. As a result of the oil boom years of the 1970s, the tertiary level of education was expanded to reach every sub-region of Nigeria. The federal and state governments were previously the only bodies licensed to operate universities. Recently, licenses have been granted to individuals, corporate, and religious bodies to establish private universities in the country.

The National Universities Commission (NUC) is the major accreditation and regulatory body that enforces uniform standard and sets admissions capacity of every Nigerian university.

== Federal institutions ==
Name	State	Abbreviation	Location	Funding	Founded
African Aviation and Aerospace University	Abuja.	AAAU	Abuja	Federal	2022
Abubakar Tafawa Balewa University	Bauchi.	ATBU	Bauchi	Federal	1980
Adeyemi Federal University of Education	Ondo	AFUED	Ondo	Federal	1964
Admiralty University Ibusa	Delta	ADUN	Ibusa	Federal	2023
Ahmadu Bello University	Kaduna.	ABU	Zaria	Federal	1962
Air Force Institute of Technology	Kaduna	AFIT	Kaduna	Federal	2018
Alex Ekwueme Federal University Ndufu Alike Ikwo	Ebonyi	AE-FUNAI	Ikwo	Federal	2011
Alvan Ikoku Federal University of Education	Imo	AIFUE	Owerri	Federal	2023
Bayero University	Kano	BUK	Kano	Federal	1977
Federal University Birnin Kebbi	Kebbi	FUBK	Birnin Kebbi	Federal	2013
Federal University Dutse	Jigawa	FUD	Dutse	Federal	2011
Federal University Dutsin-Ma	Katsina	FUDM	Dutsin-Ma	Federal	2011
Federal University Gashua	Yobe	FUGASHUA	Gashua	Federal	2013
Federal University Gusau	Zamfara	FUGUS	Gusau	Federal	2013
Federal University Kashere	Gombe	FUK	Kashere	Federal	2011
Federal University Lokoja	Kogi	FUL	Lokoja	Federal	2011
Federal University Lafia	Nasarawa	FULAFIA	Lafia	Federal	2010
Federal University of Agriculture, Abeokuta	Ogun	FUNAAB	Abeokuta	Federal	1988
Federal University of Agriculture, Mubi	Adamawa	FUAMB	Mubi	Federal	1978
Federal University of Agriculture, Zuru	Kebbi	FUAZ	Zuru	Federal	2020
Federal University of Applied Sciences Kachia	Kaduna	FUASK	Kachia	Federal	2025
Federal University of Education, Pankshin	Plateau	FUEP	Pankshin	Federal	2024
Federal University of Education, Zaria	Kaduna	FUEZ	Zaria	Federal	2023
Federal University of Health Sciences, Azare	Bauchi	FUHSA	Azare	Federal	2021
Federal University of Petroleum Resources Effurun	Delta	FUPRE	Effurun	Federal	2007
Federal University of Technology Akure	Ondo	FUTA	Akure	Federal	1981
Federal University of Technology Ikot Abasi	Akwa Ibom	FUTIA	Ikot Abasi	Federal	1921
Federal University of Technology Minna	Niger	FUTMIN	Minna	Federal	1983
Federal University of Technology Owerri	Imo	FUTO	Owerri	Federal	1981
Federal University of Transportation, Daura	Katsina	FUTD	Daura	Federal	2023
Federal University Otuoke	Bayelsa	FUO	Otuoke	Federal	2011
Federal University Oye-Ekiti	Ekiti	FUOYE	Oye-Ekiti	Federal	2011
Federal University Wukari	Taraba	FUW	Wukari	Federal	2011
Joseph Sarwuan Tarka University	Benue	JOSTUM	Makurdi	Federal	1988
Michael Okpara University of Agriculture, Umudike	Abia	MOUAU	Umudike	Federal	1992
Modibbo Adama University, Yola	Adamawa	MAU	Yola	Federal	1981
National Open University of Nigeria	Lagos	NOUN	Victoria Island	Federal	1983
Nigeria Police Academy, Wudil	Kano	NPA	Wudil	Federal	1988
Nigerian Army University, Biu	Borno	NAUB	Biu	Federal	2018
Nigerian Defense Academy	Kaduna	NDA	Kaduna	Federal	1964
Nigerian Maritime University	Delta	NMU	Okerenkoko	Federal	2018
Nnamdi Azikiwe University	Anambra	UNIZIK	Awka	Federal	1992
Obafemi Awolowo University	Osun	OAU	Ile Ife	Federal	1961
Tai Solarin Federal University of Education	Ogun	TASFUED	Ijebu-Ode	Federal	2005
University of Abuja	Federal Capital Territory	UNIABUJA	Gwagwalada	Federal	1988
University of Benin	Edo	UNIBEN	Benin City	Federal	1970
University of Calabar	Cross River	UNICAL	Calabar	Federal	1975
University of Ibadan	Oyo	UI	Ibadan	Federal	1948
University of Ilorin	Kwara	UNILORIN	Ilorin	Federal	1975
University of Jos	Plateau	UNIJOS	Jos	Federal	1971
University of Lagos	Lagos	UNILAG	Akoka	Federal	1962
University of Maiduguri	Borno	UNIMAID	Maiduguri	Federal	1975
University of Nigeria, Nsukka	Enugu	UNN	Nsukka	Federal	1955
University of Port Harcourt	Rivers	UNIPORT	Port Harcourt	Federal	1975
University of Uyo	Akwa Ibom	UNIUYO	Uyo	Federal	1991
Usmanu Danfodiyo University	Sokoto	UDUS	Sokoto	Federal	1975
Yusuf Maitama Sule Federal University of Education, Kano	Kano	YMSFUEK	Kano	Federal	2024

== State institutions ==
Name	State	Abbreviation	Location	Funding	Founded
Abdulkadir Kure University	Niger	AKUM	Minna	State	2023
Abia State University	Abia	ABSU	Uturu	State	1981
Abiola Ajimobi Technical University	Oyo	TECH-U	Ibadan	State	2012
Adamawa State University	Adamawa	ADSU	Mubi	State	2002
Adekunle Ajasin University	Ondo	AAUA	Akungba-Akoko	State	1999
Akwa Ibom State University (formerly Akwa Ibom State University of Science and Technology)	Akwa Ibom	AKSU	Uyo	State	2010
Aliko Dangote University of Science and Technology	Kano	ADUSTECH	Wudil	State	2001
Ambrose Alli University	Edo	AAU	Ekpoma	State	1981
Bauchi State University	Bauchi	BASUG	Gadau	State	2012
Bayelsa Medical University	Bayelsa	BMU	Yenagoa	State	2018
Benue State University	Benue	BSU	Makurdi	State	1992
Borno State University	Borno	BOSU	Maiduguri	State	2016
Chukwuemeka Odumegwu Ojukwu University (formerly Anambra State University)	Anambra	ANSU	Uli	State	2000
Delta State University, Abraka	Delta	DELSU	Abraka	State	1992
Delta State University of Science and Technology	Delta	DSPZ	Ozoro	State	2021
Dennis Osadebay University	Delta	DOU	Asaba	State	2021
Ebonyi State University	Ebonyi	EBSU	Abakaliki	State	1996
Edo State University, Uzairue	Edo	EDSU	Iyamho	State	2016
Ekiti State University	Ekiti	EKSU	Ado Ekiti	State	1981 (has used current name since 2011)
Emmanuel Ayande University of Education	Oyo	EAUEDOYO	Oyo	State	2021
Enugu State University of Science and Technology (formerly Anambra State University of Technology)	Enugu	ESUT	Enugu	State	1979
Gombe State University	Gombe	GSU	Gombe	State	2004
Gombe State University of Science and Technology	Gombe	GSUST	Kumo	State	2017
Ibrahim Badamasi Babangida University	Niger	IBBUL	Lapai	State	2005
Ignatius Ajuru University of Education	Rivers	IAUE	Port Harcourt	State	1971 (not a university until 2009)
Imo State University	Imo	IMSU	Owerri	State	1981. Ko madiwe university( ideato south)
Kaduna State University	Kaduna	KASU	Kaduna	State	2004
Kebbi State University of Science and Technology	Kebbi	KSUSTA	Aliero	State	2006
Kingsley Ozumba Mbadiwe University	Imo	KOMU	Ideato South	State	2016
Kwara State University	Kwara	KWASU	Malete	State	2009
Prince Abubakar Audu University	Kogi	PAAU	Anyigba	State	1999
Ladoke Akintola University of Technology	Oyo	LAUTECH	Ogbomoso	State	1990
Lagos State University	Lagos	LASU	Ojo	State	1983
Lagos State University of Education	Lagos	LASUED	Ijanikin	State	1958 (not a university until 2022)
Lagos State University of Science and Technology	Lagos	LASUST	Ikorodu	State	1977 (not a university until 2021)
Nasarawa State University	Nasarawa	NSUK	Keffi	State	2001
Niger Delta University	Bayelsa	NDU	Amassoma	State	2000
Olabisi Onabanjo University	Ogun	OOU	Ago-Iwoye	State	1982
Olusegun Agagu University of Science and Technology	Ondo	OAUST	Okitipupa	State	2008
Osun State University	Osun	UNIOSUN	Osogbo	State	2006
Plateau State University	Plateau	PLASU	Bokkos	State	2005
Rivers State University	Rivers	RIVSU	Port Harcourt	State	1972 (not a university until 1980)
Sule Lamido University	Jigawa	SLU	Kafin-Hausa	State	2013
Taraba State University	Taraba	TSU	Jalingo	State	2011
Umaru Musa Yar'adua University	Katsina	UMYU	Katsina	State	2006
University of Cross River State (formerly Cross River University of Technology)	Cross River	UNICROSS	Ekpo-Abasi, Calabar	State	2002
Sokoto State University	Sokoto	SSU	Sokoto	State	2009
University of Delta	Delta	UNIDEL	Agbor	State	2021
Yobe State University	Yobe	YSU	Damaturu	State	2006
Yusuf Maitama Sule University Kano	Kano	YUMSUK	Kano	State	2012
Zamfara State University	Zamfara	ZSU	Talata Mafara	State	2018

== Uniformed institutions ==
Name	State	Abbreviation	Location	Funding	Founded
Nigeria Airforce University	Kaduna	AFIT	Kaduna	Military	1977 (not a university until 2018)
Nigeria Maritime University	Delta	NMU	Warri	Military	2018
Nigeria Police Academy Wudil	Kano	POLAC	Wudil	Police	2013
Nigerian Army University Biu	Borno	NUAB	Biu	Military	2018
Nigerian Defence Academy	Kaduna	NDA	Kaduna	Military	1964

== Private institutions ==
Name	State	Abbreviation	Location	Funding	Founded
Achievers University	Ondo	AC	Owo	Private	2007
Adeleke University	Osun	AUE	Ede	Private	2010
Afe Babalola University	Ekiti	ABUAD	Ado-Ekiti	Private	2009
African University of Science and Technology	Federal Capital Territory	AUST	Abuja	Private	2007
Ahman Pategi University	Kwara	APU	Pategi	Private	2021
Ajayi Crowther University	Oyo	ACU	Oyo	Private	2005^{(Note 1)}
Al-Ansar University Maiduguri	Borno	AUM	Maiduguri	Private	2020
Al-Hikmah University	Kwara	AHU	Ilorin	Private	2005
Al-Qalam University	Katsina	AUK	Katsina	Private	2005
American University of Nigeria	Adamawa	AUN	Yola	Private	2005
Anchor University	Lagos	-	Ayobo	Private	2014
Arthur Jarvis University	Cross River	AJU	Akpabuyo	Private	2016
Ave Maria University	Nasarawa	AMU	Piyanko	Private	2021
Babcock University	Ogun	BU	Ilishan-Remo	Private	1959 (not a university until 1999)
Baze University	Federal Capital Territory	BAZE	Abuja	Private	2011
Bells University of Technology	Ogun	BUT	Ota	Private	2004
Benson Idahosa University	Edo	BIU	Benin City	Private	2002
Bowen University	Osun	BU	Iwo	Private	2001
Bingham University	Nasarawa	BHU	Karu	Private	2005
Caleb University	Lagos	CUl	Ikorodu	Private	2008
Caritas University	Enugu		Enugu	Private	2004
CETEP City University	Lagos	-	Yaba	Private	2005
Chrisland University	Ogun	CLU	Abeokuta	Private	2015
Christopher University	Ogun	-	Mowe	Private	2015
Clifford University	Abia	CLU	Owerrinta	Private	2016
Coal City University	Enugu	CCU	Enugu	Private	2016
Covenant University	Ogun	CU	Ota	Private	2002
Crawford University	Ogun	-	Igbesa	Private	2005
Crescent University	Ogun	-	Abeokuta	Private	2005
Dominican University Ibadan	Oyo	DUI	Ibadan	Private	2016
Edwin Clark University	Delta	ECU	Kiagbodo	Private	2015
Elizade University	Ondo	EU	Ilara-Mokin	Private	2012
Evangel University, Akaeze	Ebonyi	EUA	Akaeze	Private	2012
Fountain University	Osun	FUO	Osogbo	Private	2007
Godfrey Okoye University	Enugu	GOU	Enugu	Private	2009
Greenfield University	Kaduna	GFU	Kaduna	Private	2019
Gregory University	Abia	GUU	Uturu	Private	2012
Hallmark University	Ogun	-	Ijebu-Itele	Private	2015
Hezekiah University	Imo	-	Umudi	Private	2015
Igbinedion University	Edo	IUO	Okada	Private	1999
Joseph Ayo Babalola University	Osun	JABU	Ikeji-Arakeji	Private	2006
Khadija University	Jigawa	KUM	Majia	Private	2021
Kings University	Osun	KU	Odeomu	Private	2015
Koladaisi University	Oyo	KU	Ibadan	Private	2015
Kwararafa University	Taraba	-	Wukari	Private	2005
Landmark University	Kwara	LU	Omu-Aran	Private	2011
Lead City University	Oyo	LCU	Ibadan	Private	2015
Madonna University	Rivers	-	Elele	Private	1999
McPherson University	Ogun	MCU	Seriki-Setayo	Private	2012
Mewar University	Nasarawa	-	Masaka	Private	2021
Michael and Cecilia Ibru University	Delta	MCIU	Agbara-Otor	Private	2015
Mountain Top University	Ogun	MTU	Makogi Oba	Private	2015
Mudiame University	Edo	-	Irrua	Private	2021
Nigerian University of Technology and Management	Lagos	NUTM	Apapa	Private	2019
Nile University of Nigeria	Federal Capital Territory	NUN	Abuja	Private	2009
Nok University Kachia	Kaduna	NUK	Kachia	Private (now Federal)	2021-2025
Novena University	Delta	-	Ogume	Private	2005
Obong University	Akwa Ibom	-	Obong Ntak	Private	1997 (not a university until 2007)
Oduduwa University	Osun	OUI	Ipetumodu	Private	2009
PAMO University of Medical Sciences	Rivers	-	Port Harcourt	Private	2017
Pan-Atlantic University	Lagos	PAU	Lekki	Private	2002
Paul University	Anambra	-	Awka	Private	2009
Peaceland University	Enugu	PUE	Enugu	Private	2023
Precious Cornerstone University	Oyo	PCU	Ibadan	Private	2017
Redeemer's University Nigeria	Osun	RUN	Ede	Private	2005
Renaissance University	Enugu	-	Ugbawka	Private	2005
Rhema University	Abia	-	Aba	Private	2009
Ritman University	Akwa Ibom	-	Ikot Ekpene	Private	2015
Salem University	Kogi	-	Lokoja	Private	2007
Sam Maris University	Ondo	SMU	Supare	Private	2023
Samuel Adegboyega University	Edo	SAU	Ogwa	Private	2011
Skyline University	Kano	SUN	Kano	Private	2018
Summit University	Kwara	-	Offa	Private	2015
Veritas University (Catholic University of Nigeria) Abuja	Federal Capital Territory	VUNA	Bwari	Private	2007
Wesley University	Ondo	WUO	Ondo	Private	2007
Western Delta University	Delta	WDU	Oghara	Private	2007
Westland University	Osun	WUI	Iwo	Private	2019
University of Mkar (formerly called Hilltop University)	Benue	-	Mkar	Private	2005
James Hope University, Lagos	Lagos	JHU	Lekki	Private	2021
Legacy University Okija	Anambra	-	Okija	Private	2019

== See also ==
- List of colleges of education in Nigeria
- List of polytechnics in Nigeria

== Notes ==
- ^Note 1 - Established in 1853 as a CMS Training Institution in Abeokuta prior to its relocation to Lagos from 1868 to 1896. It was retrospectively established at Oyo in March 1920.
