= List of tertiary institutions in Kano State =

List of institution in Kano state with names

Kano State is one of the 36 states of the Federal Republic of Nigeria, It is located at the northern region of the country. This is the list of Tertiary institutions in Kano State, the list contains Government and private institutions which are:

== Universities ==
- Bayero University Kano
- Aliko Dangote University of Science and Technology, Wudil
- Northwest University, Kano
- Nigeria Police Academy Wudil
- Skyline University, Kano.
- Maryam Abacha American University of Nigeria
- Al-istiqama University, Sumaila
- Azman University, Kano
- Baba Ahmed University, Kano State
- Capital City University, Kano
- Attanzil University, Kano
- Annahda International University
- Sa'adatu Rimi University of Education Kano
- Khalifa Isyaku Rabiu University
- Al-Muhibba Open University

== Colleges ==
=== Government ===
- Federal College of Education, Kano
- Federal College of Education (Technical), Bichi
- Aminu Kano College of Islamic Legal Studies, Kano
- Federal College of Agriculture produce Technology Kano
- Kano State Polytechnic
- Audu Bako School of Agriculture, Danbatta
- Kano State School of Health Technology
- Kano State School of Hygiene
- Kano State College of Arts, Sciences and Remedial Studies
- Rabi'u Musa Kwankwaso College of Advance and remedial Studies
- Aminu Dabo School of Health Sciences and Technology
- College of Education, Kura
- Entrepreneurship Vocational Technology Ltd
- Government Commercial College, Bagauda
- Government Technical College, Kano
- Government Technical College, Ungogo
- Government Technical College, Wudil

Privates

- Ameenudeen College of Education, Badawa

=== Government ===
- Kano State College of Nursing and Midwifery, Madobi
- School of Health Information Management Aminu Kano Teaching Hospital, Kano
- School of Post Basic Paediatric and Nephrology Nursing, AKTH
- Community Midwifery Program, School of Basic Midwifery, Danbatta
- School of Health Information Management, AKTH
- School of Orthopaedic Cast Technology, National Orthopaedic Hospital, Dala
- School of Hygiene, Kano

LIBRARY

- Kano State Informatics Institute Kura.
- Kano State Sport Institute Ƙarfi, Kura
- Murtala Muhammad Library Kano

Others

- Adhama Innovation Enterprise Institute, Bompai
- Hajia Sa'adatu and Umul-Khairi Foundation
- Mama initiative
- Al'asas School of Nursing and Health Sciences Kura.
