= List of tertiary institutions in Jigawa State =

Jigawa State (Hausa: Jihar Jigawa; Fula: Leydi Jigawa 𞤤𞤫𞤴𞤮𞤤 𞤶𞤭𞤺𞤢𞤱𞤢) is one of the 36 states of Nigeria, located in the northern region of the country. Below are the list of tertiary institutions found in the state

== Colleges in Jigawa State ==
1. Binyaminu Usman College of Agriculture, Hadejia
2. Jigawa State College of Education
3. College of Arabic and Islamics Studies

== Universities in Jigawa State ==
1. Federal University Dutse
2. Sule Lamido University, Kafin Hausa, Jigawa
3. Khadija University, Majia, Jigawa State
4. Kaffi Hausa state University
5. STEB Jigawa
