= Azman (disambiguation) =

Azman may refer to:

- Azman, surname and given name
- Azman Air, Nigerian airline
- Azman University, Kano
