= Abdulkarim Sabo Muhammad =

Nigerian Professor and VC

3rd Vice-Chancellor of Federal University Dutse
- Incumbent
- Assumed office 2020
- Preceded by: Fatima Batulu Muktar

Personal details
- Born: Abdulkarim Sabo Muhammad
- Profession: academic

Abdulkarim Sabo Muhammad is a professor and the third Vice-Chancellor of Federal University, Dutse. He was elected the Vice-Chancellor after the governing council advertised the position and 36 application were received. Abdulkarim Sabo was the returning officer for Bauchi Governorship Election where Bala Muhammed of PDP won the election in 2023.

== Career ==
Abdulkarim was the former Deputy Vice-Chancellor, Academics of Federal University, Dutse. He was elected the Vice-Chancellor after the governing council of the University declared him the winner out of the 36 contestants for the post after the end of tenure of Fatima Batulu Muktar, his predecessor in 2023. He was elected through a voting process organised by the governing council after the shortlist of top three contestants.
