= Abdullahi Liman Tukur =

Nigerian academic

8th Vice-Chancellor of Modibbo Adama University, Yola
- In office May 2019 – 2024
- Preceded by: Kyari Mohammed
- Succeeded by: Ibrahim Umar (MAU 9th VC)

Personal details
- Born: Abdullahi Liman Tukur
- Education: Bayero University Kano University of Maiduguri
- Profession: Academic

Abdullahi Liman Tukur is a professor, former Acting Dean, Faculty of Environmental Sciences and the 8th Vice-Chancellor of Modibbo Adama University Yola.

== Career ==
He was appointed in 2019 following the end of the tenure of his predecessor, Kyari Mohammed in June 2019. He was awarded the Fellowship of the Society for Peace and Practice Study at its 10th General Assembly in 2016. Three professors were dismissed for ethical misconduct during Abdullahi's tenure as the VC of MAU.
