= Ibrahim Umar (professor of crop protection) =

Nigerian academic

lbrahim Umar

9th Vice-Chancellor of Modibbo Adama Federal University of Technology, Yola
- Incumbent
- Assumed office 14 August 2024
- Preceded by: Abdullahi Liman Tukur

Personal details
- Profession: Academic

Ibrahim Umar is a Nigerian professor of crop protection and the 9th vice-chancellor of Modibbo Adama Federal University of Technology, Yola (MAUTECH).

He was the rector of Adamawa State Polytechnic before his appointment at the 17th governing council meeting of MAUTECH following the end of term of his predecessor, Abdullahi Liman Tukur.
