= Fatima Batul Mukhtar =

Nigerian botanist and academic

Professor Fatima Batul Mukhtar
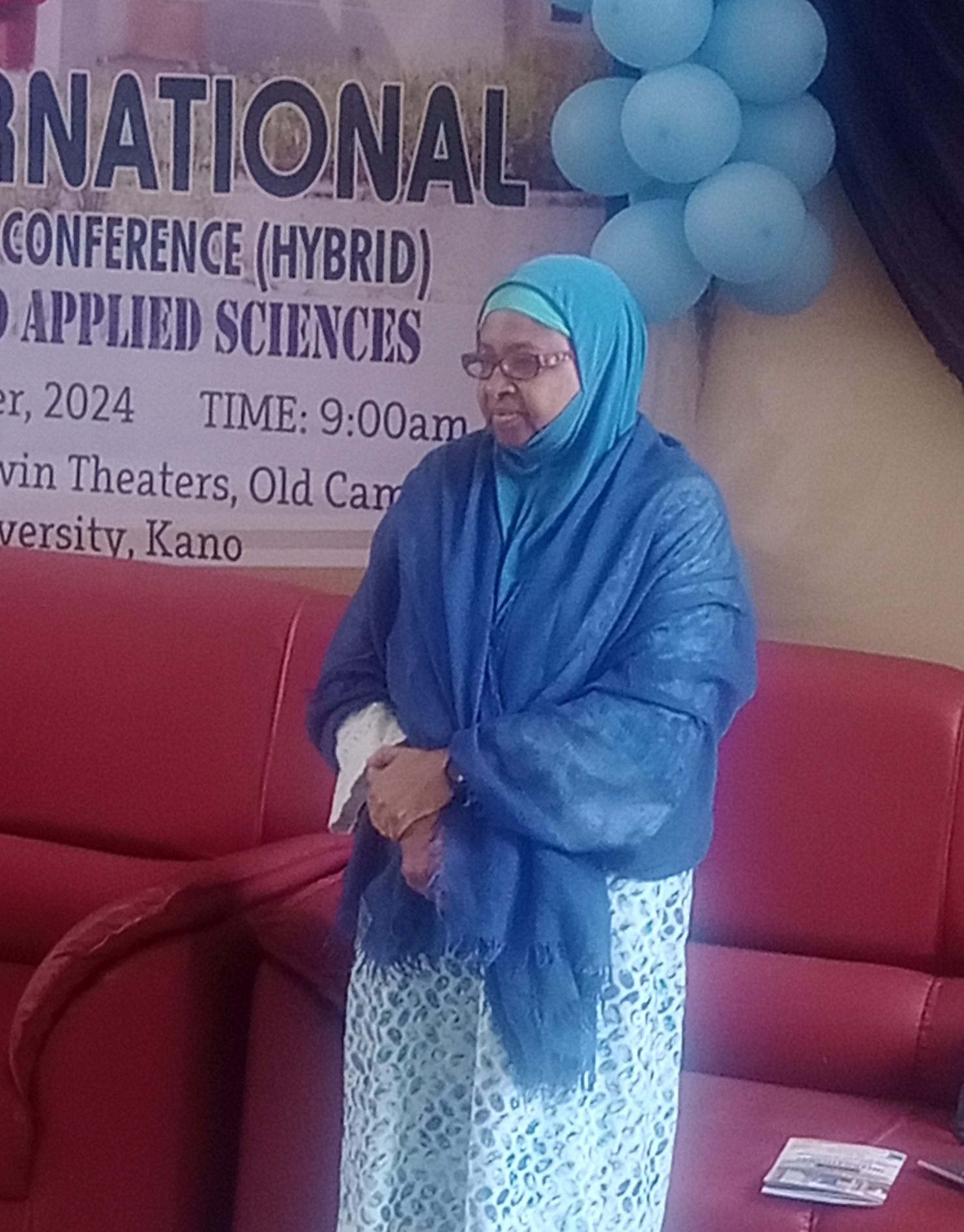
- Prof Fatima Batul Muktar picture

1st Vice-Chancellor Azman University, Kano
- Incumbent
- Assumed office 30 August 2023

(1st Female) 2nd Vice-Chancellor Federal University Dutse
- In office 2016–2021
- Preceded by: Professor Jibrilla Dahiru Amin
- Succeeded by: Professor Abdulkarim Sabo Muhammad

Deputy Vice-Chancellor Northwest University Kano
- In office 2015–2017
- Succeeded by: Professor Isyaku Ibrahim Indabawa

Dean Faculty of Science Northwest University Kano
- In office 2012–2015
- Succeeded by: Professor Amina Salihi Bayero

Personal details
- Born: 23 May 1963 (age 63) Kano
- Relations: Married
- Education: Bayero University, Kano; Ahmadu Bello University, Zaria
- Profession: Academic

Fatima Batul Mukhtar (born 23 May 1963) is a Nigerian academic and professor of botany who serves as the vice-chancellor of Azman University Kano. Her research interests are centred on growth regulation, biostatistics, biotechnology and plant conservation. She was appointed vice-chancellor of the Federal University Dutse by President Muhammadu Buhari and served in the position from 2016 to 2021.

== Early life and education ==
Mukhtar was born on 23 May 1963 in Kano Municipal Local Government Area of Kano State. She attended Shahuchi Primary School and Shekara Girls Boarding Primary School, and later Government Girls College, Dala. She obtained her first degree in botany from Ahmadu Bello University in 1984. She subsequently earned her second and third degrees from Bayero University in 1994 and 2005, respectively. In 2012, she enrolled in an agricultural biotechnology course at Michigan State University.

== Career ==
Mukhtar started her career in 1994 at Bayero University Kano as an assistant lecturer and rose to professor of botany in 2010. She held responsibilities, from level coordinator to head of the Plant Science Department.

Mukhtar is a member of Northwest University, Kano, and was one of the founding academic administrators. She served as the dean of the Faculty of Science and as the deputy vice chancellor in 2015, where she chaired the ICT Committee, the Hospital Revolving Fund Committee, and the Budget Monitoring and Performance Committee.

== Appointments ==
Mukhtar was appointed as the second vice-chancellor of Federal University Dutse by President Muhammadu Buhari on 14 February 2016.

On 30 August 2023, Azman University appointed Mukhtar as its inaugural vice-chancellor. The appointment was historic, as she became both the first person and the first woman to assume the university's highest leadership position.
