= Federal University of Technology =

Federal University of Technology may refer to

- Federal University of Technology Akure Nigeria
- Federal University of Technology Owerri Nigeria
- Federal University of Technology Minna Nigeria
- Federal University of Technology Yola Nigeria
