= Musa Tukur Yakasai =

Nigerian academic

Vice-Chancellor of Kano University of Science and Technology
- Incumbent
- Assumed office January 2023
- Succeeded by: Shehu Alhaji Musa

Personal details
- Born: Musa Tukur Yakasai
- Profession: Academic

Musa Tukur Yakasai is a professor and the Vice-Chancellor of Aliko Dangote University of Science and Technology (KUST).

== Career ==
He was appointed as the Vice-Chancellor of KUST in 2023 after the end of tenure of Shehu Alhaji Musa.
