= Shehu Alhaji Musa =

Nigerian academic

Vice-Chancellor of Kano University of Science and Technology
- In office November 2013 – January 2023
- Succeeded by: Musa Tukur Yakasai

Personal details
- Born: Shehu Alhaji Musa
- Profession: Academic

Shehu Alhaji Musa is a professor and the former vice-chancellor of Kano University of Science and Technology (KUST). He partnered with Aliko Dangote in 2015 for an agricultural project.

== Career ==
He was appointed the vice-chancellor of KSUT now known as Aliko Dangote University for 9 years serving as the longest vice-chancellor of the university before he was succeeded by Musa Tukur Yakasai in 2023.
