= Sa'adatu Rimi University of Education =

Government-owned learning institution

Sa'adatu Rimi University of Education Kano
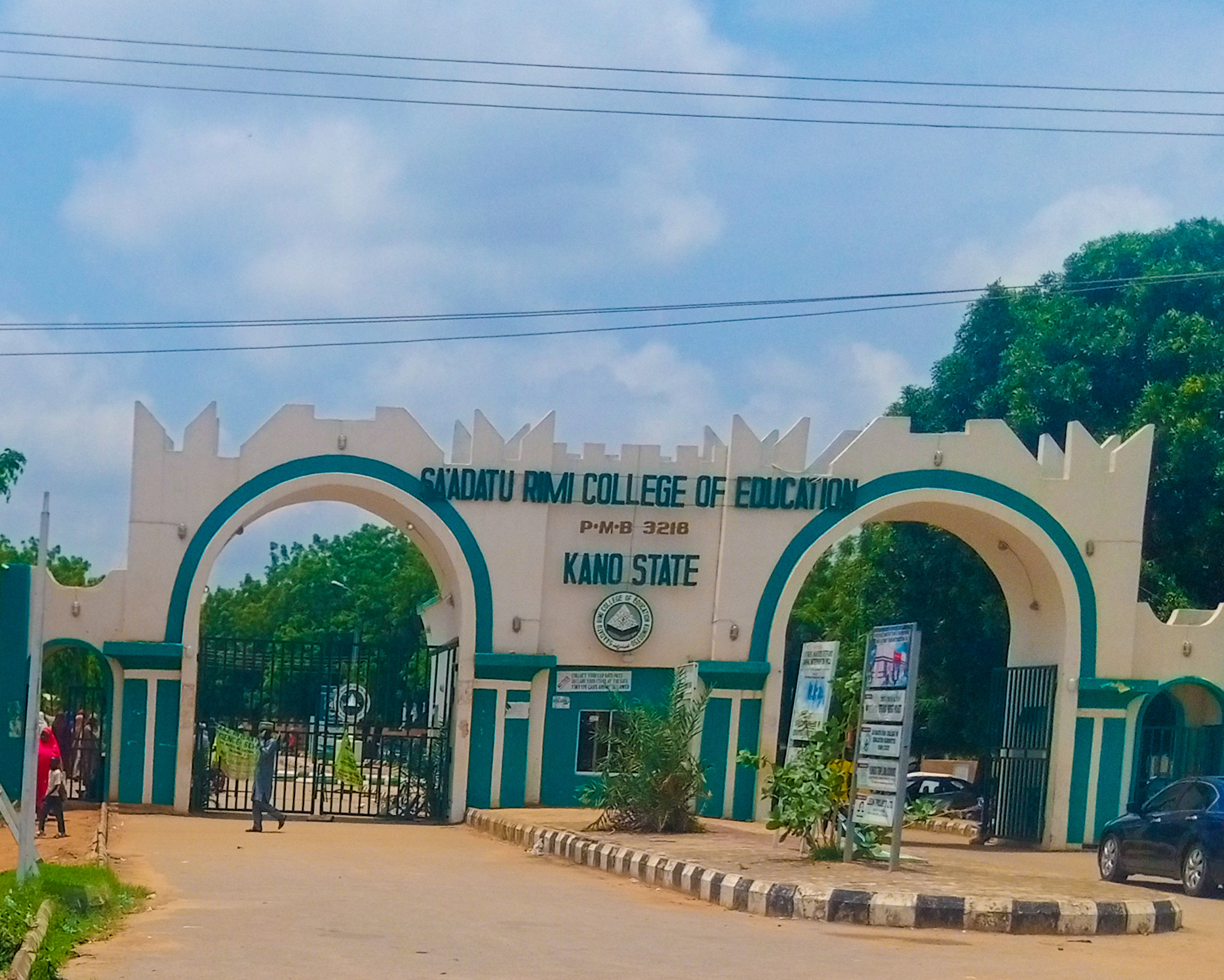
- Former name: Sa'adatu Rimi College of Education
- Type: Public
- Location: Along Zaria Road, Kano City, Kano, Kano State, Nigeria
- Website: https://srcoe.edu.ng

Sa'adatu Rimi University of Education Kano is a government-owned university of education in Kano State, Nigeria. The National Universities Commission (NUC) approved the licensing and upgrading of Sa'adatu Rimi College of Education along Zaria Road, Kumbotso Kano State to Sa'adatu Rimi University of Education on February 14, 2023.

== History ==
=== College of Education ===
Sa'adatu Rimi College of Education, Kumbotso, was established in 1981 by the Kano State government, originally known as Advanced Teacher's College (ATC), Waje, it was initially located at Pilgrims Camp and later renamed College of Education, Kumbotso, in 1982, it moved to Zaria Road, Kano, under the Kano State Institute for Higher Education. In 1987, the institute was decentralized, resulting in autonomy for Kano State Polytechnic, Kano State College of Education, and Kano State College of Arts Science and Remedial Studies. The college had two campuses in Gumel and Kumbotso, with the central administration in located Gumel. The college split due to the creation of Jigawa State, forming Jigawa State College of Education and Kano State College of Education. Kano State College of Education was split into Wudil (Sciences and Vocational Education) and Kumbotso (arts, languages, and social sciences) campuses respectively. The two campuses later merged in Kumbotso after the establishment of Kano University of Science and Technology. The college was later renamed Sa’adatu Rimi College of Education, Kumbotso, in honour of the deceased wife of Kano State's first civilian governor Abubakar Rimi.

=== University of Education ===
The National University Commission (NUC) has endorsed the elevation of SRCOE from a college to a university on Tuesday 14 February. This decision comes after the board approved the resolution sent by the Kano State government for the upgrading. The Institution is now the 61st state-owned university and the 221st university in Nigeria University System (NUS).

The university was established in the year (2023) with the aim of promoting educational studies and producing quality teachers.

== List of Courses/Department in Sa'adatu Rimi College of Education(EDKANO) ==
- Arabic / English
- Arabic / Hausa
- Arabic / Islamic Studies
- Biology / Chemistry
- Biology / Geography
- Biology / Integrated Science
- Biology / Mathematics
- Biology / Physics
- Business Education
- Chemistry / Integrated Science
- Chemistry / Mathematics
- Chemistry / Physics
- Christian Religious Studies / English
- Computer Education / Physics
- Computer Education / Biology
- Computer Science Education / Integrated Science
- Computer Science Education / Mathematics
- Economics / English
- Economics / Geography
- Economics / History
- Economics / Mathematics
- Economics / Social Studies
- English / Geography
- English / Hausa
- English / History
- English / Igbo
- English / Islamic Studies
- English / Social Studies
- English / Yoruba
- Geography / History
- Geography / Integrated Science
- Geography / Mathematics
- Geography / Physics
- Hausa / History
- Hausa / Igbo
- Hausa / Igbo L2
- Hausa / Islamic Studies
- Hausa / Social Studies
- Hausa / Yoruba L2
- History / Islamic Studies
- Integrated Science / Mathematics Education
- Islamic Studies / Social Studies
- Mathematics / Physics
- Primary Education Studies
- Fine And Applied Arts (Double Major)
- Home Economics (Double Major)
- Agricultural Science (Double Major)

=== Free Education ===
The physically challenged students of this university were offered a tuition-free education.
