= Asti (disambiguation) =

Asti is a city and comune in Italy.

Asti may also refer to:

- Asti (wine)
- Asti (restaurant), a defunct Italian restaurant, with opera-singing waiters, in New York City
- Asti, California
- Province of Asti
- Asti (Thracian tribe)

People

- Adriana Asti (1931–2025), Italian actress
- Alfredo Asti, Uruguayan politician
- Anna Asti, Russian singer

ASTI may also refer to:

- AŞTİ, the Ankara Intercity Bus Terminal
  - AŞTİ (Ankara Metro), the metro station at the bus terminal
- Acid Survivors Trust International, a non-profit organization for survivors of acid and burn violence, and its prevention
- Ascent Solar Technologies, Inc., a solar panels company located in Colorado
- Association of Secondary Teachers, Ireland
- Agricultural Science and Technology Indicators, a source of information on agricultural research and development (R&D) statistics

ASTi may also refer to:

- Advanced Simulation Technology, Inc., a company specializing in digital audio systems for flight simulators located in Herndon, Virginia
