= List of tertiary institutions in Adamawa State =

Adamawa is one of the 36 states in Nigeria, located in the North eastern part of Nigeria and its capital city is Yola. This list of tertiary institutions in Adamawa State includes universities, polytechnics and colleges that are owned by Federal Government, State Government and private individuals.

== Universities in Adamawa State ==
- American University of Nigeria
- Modibbo Adama University, Yola
- Adamawa State University

== Colleges and Polytechnics in Adamawa State ==
- Adamawa State Polytechnic, Yola
- Federal Polytechnic, Mubi
- Federal College of Education, Yola
