= Ibrahim Umar =

Ibrahim Umar may refer to:

- Ibrahim Umar (physicist) (died 2023), Nigerian scientist and vice-chancellor of Bayero University, Kano
- Ibrahim Umar (professor of crop protection), Nigerian scientist and vice-chancellor of Modibbo Adama Federal University of Technology, Yola
