= Abdullahi Mustapha (biotechnologist) =

Nigerian chemist, academic and public administrator

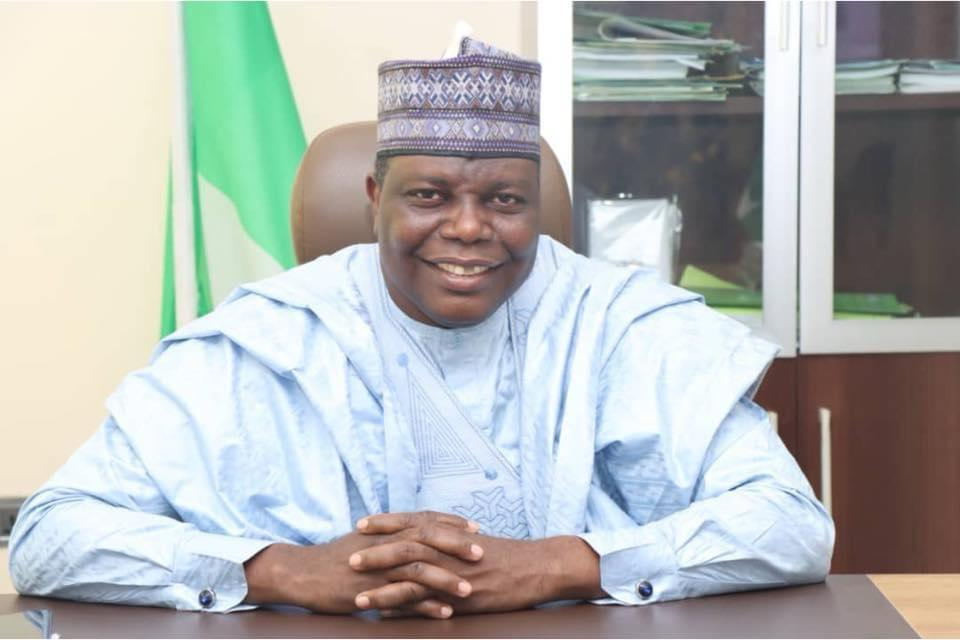
Prof Abdullahi Mustapha Dambatta, DG/CEO National Biotechnology Research and Development Agency (NBRDA)

Abdullahi Mustapha D., NPOM (born 1 January 1973) is the Director General/CEO of the National Biotechnology Research and Development Agency (NBRDA), a federal institution under the Federal Ministry of Innovation, Science and Technology of Nigeria. He was first appointed in April 2020. He is a Nigerian Professor of Bioinorganic Chemistry, an academic, and a public administrator. He was reappointed for a second term in November 2024.

== Early life and education ==
Mustapha was born in Dambatta, Kano State. Mustapha studied chemistry at Bayero University Kano, where he obtained a Bachelor of Science degree in 1998 and a Master of Science degree in 2004. He completed his PhD in Chemistry at the University of Strathclyde in Glasgow in 2008.

== Academic career ==
Mustapha began his academic career as a lecturer at the Kano University of Science and Technology, Wudil, before joining the Federal University Dutse, where he was promoted to the rank of professor in 2015. His academic interests include analytical and environmental chemistry, and he has supervised several postgraduate research projects in related areas.

== Public service career ==
In April 2020, Mustapha was appointed Director General of the National Biotechnology Development Agency by President Muhammadu Buhari. The passage of the National Biotechnology Development Agency Establishment Act, 2022 renamed the institution as the National Biotechnology Research and Development Agency (NBRDA). He was reappointed for a second five-year term in October 2024 by President Bola Tinubu.

== Leadership at NBRDA ==
Under Mustapha’s leadership, NBRDA has worked with national and international research institutions in agricultural biotechnology, biosafety regulation, and technology transfer. During this period, Nigeria implemented the commercial release of genetically modified cowpea and TELA maize, developed through partnerships with international agricultural research organisations.

In 2021, the agency launched the NABDA Journal of Biotechnology Research (NJBR), an open-access platform for scientific publications in biotechnology. The agency has also collaborated with the Federal Ministry of Health (Nigeria), the Open Forum on Agricultural Biotechnology, and other private and government organisations on initiatives promoting biotechnology’s role in food security and public health.

He has also been involved in the institution's reforms. The National Biotechnology Development Agency (Establishment) Act, 2022, assigned NBRDA its statutory mandate. The law outlined the functions of the agency in research, capacity building, and policy coordination.

== Recognition ==
In 2023, Mustapha received the National Productivity Order of Merit (NPOM) for contributions to national development in the fields of science and technology. He is a recipient of several other awards.
