= CETEP City University =

- Type: for-profit
- Active: 2005–2006
- Affiliations: NUC
- Location: Yaba, Lagos State, Nigeria
- Campus: Urban

CETEP City University was a privately owned higher institution located in Yaba, a suburb of Lagos State, South-Western Nigeria. The university offers degree courses at undergraduate and postgraduate levels upon its establishment in 2005. In 2006, the university went bankrupt.

== See also ==
- List of universities in Nigeria
