= Jibrilla Dahiru Amin =

Nigerian veterinarian and academic

OFR Jibrilla Dahiru Amin
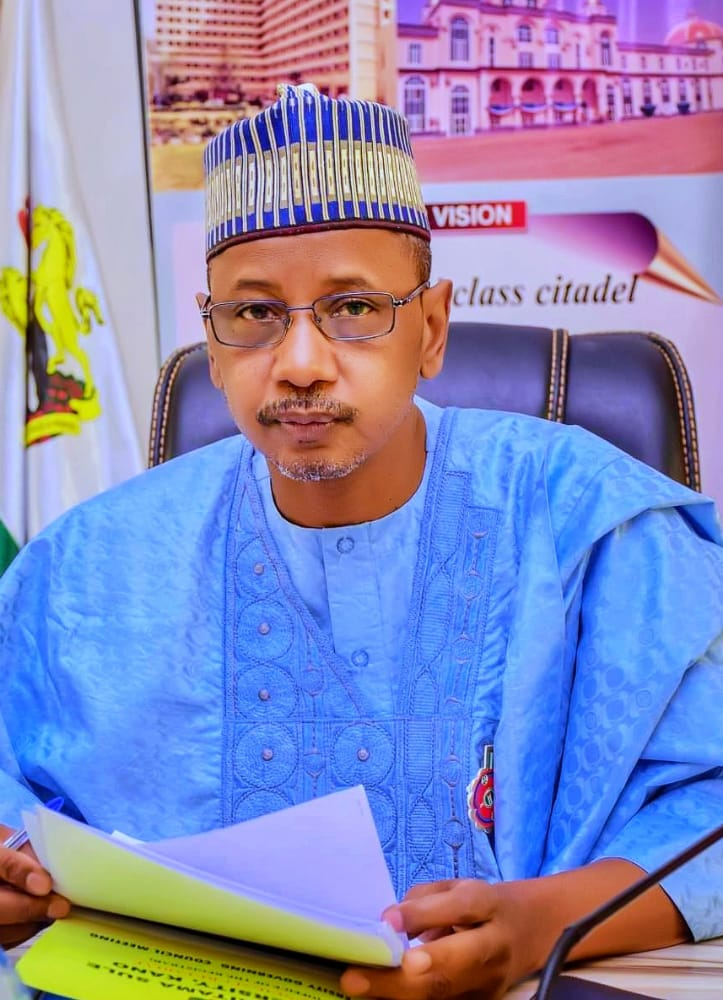
- Professor Jibrilla Dahiru Amin

Vice Chancellor of Federal University Dutse
- In office February 15, 2011 – 2016
- Preceded by: Position established
- Succeeded by: Fatima Batul Mukhtar

Personal details
- Born: October 15, 1958 (age 67) Song, Adamawa State, Nigeria
- Occupation: Veterinarian, Academic
- Known for: Pioneer Vice Chancellor of Federal University Dutse

Jibrilla Dahiru Amin (born October 15, 1958) is a Nigerian veterinarian and academic who served as the pioneer vice chancellor of Federal University Dutse (FUD) from 2011 to 2016. He has made significant contributions to veterinary medicine and higher education in Nigeria, and he was awarded the Officer of the Order of the Federal Republic (OFR) in 2006.

== Early life and education ==
Amin was born on October 15, 1958, in Song, Adamawa State, Nigeria. He attended Uba Central Primary School in Borno State and Yelwa Government Secondary School in Yola. Professor Amin graduated with a Doctor of Veterinary Medicine (DVM) degree from Ahmadu Bello University, Zaria, in 1982. He furthered his studies at the Royal Veterinary College, University of London, where he obtained his MSc in 1985 and PhD in 1991. He also holds a postgraduate diploma in management from the University of Maiduguri and is a Fellow of the College of Veterinary Surgeons Nigeria (2011). He was a Commonwealth scholar during his PhD studies and from December 1992 to November 1995 he was Rockefeller Biotechnology Career Fellow (postdoctoral fellowship) to study molecular and cellular biology of Chlamydia psittaci at the Royal Veterinary College, London. This entailed making research visits (during July–September) to the RVC during the tenure of the fellowship.

Also, in July–August 2001 he attended a Fulbright (International Visitor Leadership Program) Summer Institute for Higher Education Reforms at the George Washington University and Cambridge College, USA and also attended a three-week institute in 2007. During these visits, he and other members of the team undertook study tours of many universities in the US. They also had training in leadership and strategic planning.

== Career ==
- University of Maiduguri: Joined as an Assistant Lecturer in 1983 and rose to the rank of Professor of Theriogenology in 1998. He served in various administrative roles, including Head of Department, Dean of Postgraduate Studies, and Deputy Vice-Chancellor.
- Vice-Chancellor, University of Maiduguri: Appointed in 2003 and served until 2008. During his tenure, he established several programs and faculties, significantly expanding access to university education.
- Visiting Professor, National Universities Commission: Served from 2008 to 2010, where he chaired the Standing Committee on Private Universities.
- Secretary General, Committee of Vice Chancellors: Held this position from 2010 to 2011, advising the Federal Government on university education.
- Pioneer vice-chancellor, Federal University Dutse: From 2011 to 2016, he was instrumental in the establishment and development of the university.

== Contributions and achievements ==
Amin rose through the ranks to become a professor of theriogenology in October 1998. He served as head of Department, coordinator, Remedial Science Programme, dean of postgraduate studies and deputy vice-chancellor at the University of Maiduguri at one time or the other.

He was a member (2000–2003), Industrial/Manufacturing Sector Steering Committee of the National Council on Privatization (Sugar Development Sub-Committee). He was also a member (2001), National Committee, International Year of Volunteers of the United Nations where they sought to encourage volunteering and to especially inculcate the habit among university students. He served as a member (2002–2012), Pioneer Board of the Postgraduate College of the Veterinary Surgeon, Nigeria.

Amin was appointed by the Obasanjo administration as vice-chancellor University of Maiduguri from May 2003 to May 2008. During his tenure, five programmes were established in the College of Medical Sciences, and two in the Faculty of Science. The Centre for Distance and the Faculty of Pharmacy were also established. By these actions, he facilitated a massive increase in access to university education.

Officer of the Order of the Federal Republic of Nigeria (OFR) for Service to his Community, University, and the Veterinary Profession. In the last year of his tenure (2007-2008) he served as the chairman of, the Committee of Vice-Chancellors of Nigerian Universities and concurrently served as a board member of the Association of Commonwealth Universities. He then served as a visiting professor National Universities Commission, Abuja 2008 – 2010.

He was assigned to serve as the chairman of the Standing Committee on Private Universities during which seven universities were licensed. From the NUC he moved on to become the secretary general, Committee of Vice Chancellors 2010 – 2011. As the secretary general, he also served in an advisory capacity on university education whenever called to do so by the Federal Government.

He was subsequently appointed by the Jonathan administration as the pioneer vice-chancellor, Federal University, Dutse 2011-2016. The university was established from scratch and graduated the first set before the end of his tenure. At the expiration of his tenure he did his sabbatical as a professor in the Dept of Public and Environmental Health, National Open University of Nigeria 2016- 2017. This position exposed him to the workings of West Africa’s largest Open and Distance Learning Institution. On return to the University of Maiduguri, he was elected as one of the representatives of the University Senate on the Council of the University (2017-2021

== Leadership and impact ==
He was the chairman, Visitation Panel, Saadatu Rimi College of Education, Kumbotso, Kano (2021). They examined the records of the college for the previous ten years and made far-reaching recommendations including the transformation of the college to a university which was accepted by the Kano State Government. He was subsequently appointed chairman, Planning and Implementation Committee for transforming Saadatu Rimi College of Education into a university. The NUC has since approved the university and it has taken off.

From November 2021 – May 2023, he served as the pro-chancellor and chairman of council, Yusuf Maitama Sule University Kano. He is currently the chairman, board of trustees, Committee of Vice Chancellors of Nigerian Universities and has recently (January to May 2024) served as the chairman of, the Inter-Ministerial Committee on Degree Certificate Milling. Amin has served in numerous capacities:

- Board and committee memberships: He has been involved with the National Council on Privatization, United Nations International Year of Volunteers, and the Veterinary Council of Nigeria.
- Awards and honors: In 2006, he was awarded the Officer of the Order of the Federal Republic of Nigeria (OFR) for his services to the community, university, and veterinary profession.
- Current roles: chairman of the board of trustees for the Committee of Vice Chancellors of Nigerian Universities and member of the Nigerian Universities Rankings Advisory Committee.

== Personal life ==
Jibrilla Dahiru Amin is married. Additional details about his personal life are not widely publicized.
