= Arthur Eze =

Nigerian Businessman

- Born: 25 November 1948 (age 77); Dunukofia, Anambra State
- Citizenship: Nigerian
- Occupation: CEO of Atlas Oranto Petroleum

Arthur Eze is a Nigerian businessman, oil mogul and philanthropist who is CEO of Atlas Oranto Petroleum. He is also the pro-chancellor of Peaceland University, Enugu, Enugu State.

== Early life ==
Arthur Eze was born in Eastern Nigeria, on 27 November 1948. His elder brother Igwe Robert Eze, is the monarch of Ukpo, a town in Dunukofia. He is a Prince born into a traditional royal family.

== Education ==
In 1970, Eze graduated from St. Augustin Secondary School in Nkwerre, Imo. He proceeded to California State University, Long Beach where he got a degree in Mechanical and Chemical Engineering between 1974 and 1978.

== Career ==
In 2023, Eze was appointed the pro-chancellor of Peaceland University Enugu, Enugu State. In 1991 Eze founded Atlas Oranto petroleum.
