= Samuel Oye Bandele =

Nigeria educator

Prof. Samuel Oye Bandele

Vice-Chancellor of Anchor University

Personal details
- Born: Samuel Oye Bandele Ilejemeje, Ekiti State, Nigeria
- Occupation: Academic; author; Writer
- Profession: Educationist

Samuel Oye Bandele (age 63) is a Nigerian academic and is (as at February 2024) the Vice Chancellor of Anchor University in Lagos.

== Early life ==
Bandele was born in Ijesamodu – Ekiti a small town in Ilejemeje of Ekiti State. He had a BSc with First class honors in Mathematics Education from the University of Benin in 1983. He went on to the University of Ibadan in 1985 and in 1989 he completed both a master's degree and a PhD in Education Measurement and Evaluation. Bamidele is interested in Mathematics Education, Computer Science Education and Tests, Measurement and Educational Evaluation, Tests, Measurement and Evaluation and Research and Statistics.

== Career ==
Bandele served as the director of education and also as the dean, Faculty of Education and the director, Directorate of Part-Time Programmes of the University of Ado-Ekiti. He was the founding director of the Computer Center and head of Department of the Computer Science of the College of Education, Ikere-Ekiti, He was the first vice-chancellor of The University of Education, Ikere-Ekiti (TUNEDIK) and later University of Science and Technology Ifaki (USTI), before the two Universities merged with the former University of Ado-Ekiti to become Ekiti State University (EKSU). According to various online sources, he was removed from that post by the Ekiti State Governor in late 2018. In 2022, he was appointed Vice Chancellor of Anchor University in Lagos.

He is an executive member of local and international academic associations He served as editor-in-chief of several academic Journals in Nigeria and he founded the National Association of Educational Researcher and Evaluation (NAERE).He has also held the position of a visiting professor in the Faculty of Education of the Obafemi Awolowo University, Ile- Ife, Nigeria(Abayomi Olaofe)

== Professional bodies ==
Bandele associates with many professional bodies locally and internationally both in Mathematics and Computer knowledge which including (COL) Common Wealth of Learning, Vancouver, Teaching and Learning in Higher Education (THLE), Singapore, Curriculum Organization of Nigeria (CON), Nigeria Association of Professional Educators (NAPE), Nigeria Education Research Council (NERA), Educational Studies Association of Nigeria (ESAN), Mathematics Association of Nigeria (MAN); Ondo State Mathematical Association; National Association of Educational Researchers and Evaluation (NAERE) and Computer Association of Nigeria (COAN).

== Achievements ==
Bandele attended international conferences and presented papers relating to educational Assessment, Evaluation and Quality Assurance in teaching and learning. In 2007 he was named the Best Paper presenter at the 12th International Conference of Open Learning held in Cambridge, United Kingdom. He was the Contact Person for the UNESCO-funded educational project for sub-Saharan Africa for developing Nigerian Universities. He was among the five professors invited in 2005 from all over the world to review the programmes of the Faculty of Education of the University of Botswana. In 2009 he completed the Executive Management training programme in Pretoria, South Africa. he trained in Swaziland and Mozambique.

== Personal life ==
Bandele married to Comfort Titilayo. They have four children – three girls and a boy.
