= Federal University of Transportation, Daura =

Public university in Daura, Nigeria

- Motto: Innovation through Science and Technology
- Type: Public
- Established: 2023; 3 years ago
- Vice-Chancellor: Umar Adam Katsayal
- Location: Daura, Katsina State, Nigeria; 12.974°N 8.347°E
- Colors: Maroon
- Website: www.futd.edu.ng

The Federal University of Transportation, Daura (also known as FUTD) is a federal government-owned university located in Daura of Katsina State, in North Western Nigeria. It was founded in 2023, driven by the federal government of Nigeria to create universities that specialize in producing graduates with practical knowledge of technologies. The first vice-chancellor of the university is Prof. Umar Adam-Katsayal.

== See also ==
- List of universities in Nigeria
- Education in Nigeria
