= Azman =

Azman is a surname and given name, and a Malay patronymic. Notable people with the name include:

== Surname or patronymic ==
- Ahmad Amsyar Azman (born 1992), Malaysian diver
- Aifa Azman, Malaysian squash player
- Ferhan Azman, Turkish architect
- Hadin Azman (born 1994), Malaysian footballer
- Moshe Reuven Azman, Chief Rabbi of Ukraine
- Yank Azman, Canadian actor

== Given name ==
- Azman Adnan (born 1971), Malaysian footballer
- Azman Abdullah, Singaporean bodybuilder
- Azman Hashim, Malaysian financier
- Azman Ibrahim (football manager) (born 1960), Malaysian businessman and former football manager
- Azman Ibrahim (politician), Malaysian politician
- Azman Ilham Noor, Bruneian footballer
- Azman Ismail, Malaysian politician
- Khairul Azman Mohamed, Malaysian footballer

== Alias ==
- Azman was the alias of Abdul Rahman bin Arshad, one of the two robbers involved in Singapore's 1994 Oriental Hotel murder
