= Kyari Mohammed =

Nigerian academic

- Born: Kyari Mohammed; 6 June 1963 (age 63)
- Education: University of Ibadan
- Occupations: A Nigerian academic, professor of history.
- Years active: October 2008–September 2012

Kyari Mohammed (born 6 June 1963) is a Nigerian academic, professor of history, and the vice chancellor of the Nigerian Army University Biu, Borno State and the former vice chancellor of Moddibo Adama University of Technology (MAUTECH), (formerly Federal University of Technology (FUT), Yola), Adamawa State, and serves as chair for peace and security studies at the same institution. He began his position as a replacement for Prof. Bashir Usman Hanna. Mohammed is one of Nigeria's leading scholars on the ongoing Boko Haram insurgency and counter insurgency. Now on this day being 26 April 2019, a new vice chancellor has been announced in the person of Professor Abdullahi Liman Tukur, professor of geography, from the department of geography of the institution, after the contestant has been screened by the panel on vice chancellor matters on 23 April 2019. Professor Abdullahi Liman Tukur emerged as the winner.

== Education and career ==
Mohammed earned his PhD in 1995 at the University of Ibadan (UI), Nigeria, and became a professor in 2007. He then served as professor of history at Gombe State University between October 2008 and September 2012, and has served in many other offices as well as authoring over 70 publications.
