= Nigeria Maritime University =

Public higher education institution

- Established: 2018
- Vice-Chancellor: Professor Flora Tobolayefa Oluwafemi
- Location: Gbaramatu Kingdom, Delta State, Nigeria
- Campus: Kurutie (Take-off)
- Language: English
- Website: nmu.edu.ng

Founded in 2018, Nigeria Maritime University, Okerenkoko, is a non-profit public higher education institution located in Okerenkoko, Gbaramatu Kingdom, Delta state. Officially recognized by the National Universities Commission of Nigeria, Nigeria Maritime University, Okerenkoko (NMU) is a co-educational Nigerian higher education institution that offers courses and programs leading to officially recognized higher education degrees such as bachelor's degrees in several areas of study.

The university has a regimentation unit with its first Chief Cadet Captain, Cadet Elias ezeiru osadebe bill and its first Provost Marshal, Alagoa Dandeson.

Nigeria Maritime University is the first paramilitary university and maritime college in Nigeria and West Africa. In February 2018, Nigerian University Commission gave approval to commence degree programs in the university.

The Nigeria Maritime University has a regimental unit, composed of a Regimental Director, a Chief Cadet Captain etc. Cadet Elias ezeiru osadebe bill, was the set of 2017/2018's Chief Cadet Captain before he graduated. The set of 2018/2019 has its Chief Cadet Captain Cadet Jeremiah.

== Proposed Shutdown ==
In 2021, there were rumour that the institution was shut down for non-payment of salary and poor welfare. The report was however dismissed by the registrar of the institution, Dr Alfred Mulade. The registrar described the information as fake news and reaffirmed that the school is open for academic activities
