= Bukar Abba Ibrahim University =

State university in Damaturu, Nigeria

Yobe State University
- Former names: Bukar Abba Ibrahim University
- Type: Public
- Established: 2006
- Vice-Chancellor: Prof. Mala Mohammed Daura
- Location: Damaturu, Yobe State, Nigeria
- Website: ysu.edu.ng

Yobe State University is located in Damaturu, Yobe State, Nigeria. It was founded in 2006. The institution has grown steadily and currently offers programmes under several faculties, including Faculties of Arts, Social & Management Science, Faculty of Science and Faculty of Law.

== Departments and courses ==
- Arabic
- Islamic studies
- Hausa
- English
- History
- Education
- Sharia Law
- Civil Law
- Chemistry
- Physiology
- Computer Science
- Biological science
- Mathematics and Statistics
- Physics
- Accounting
- Business Administration
- Geography
- Political Science
- Economics
- Sociology
