= Christopher University =

University in Mowe, Ogun State, Nigeria

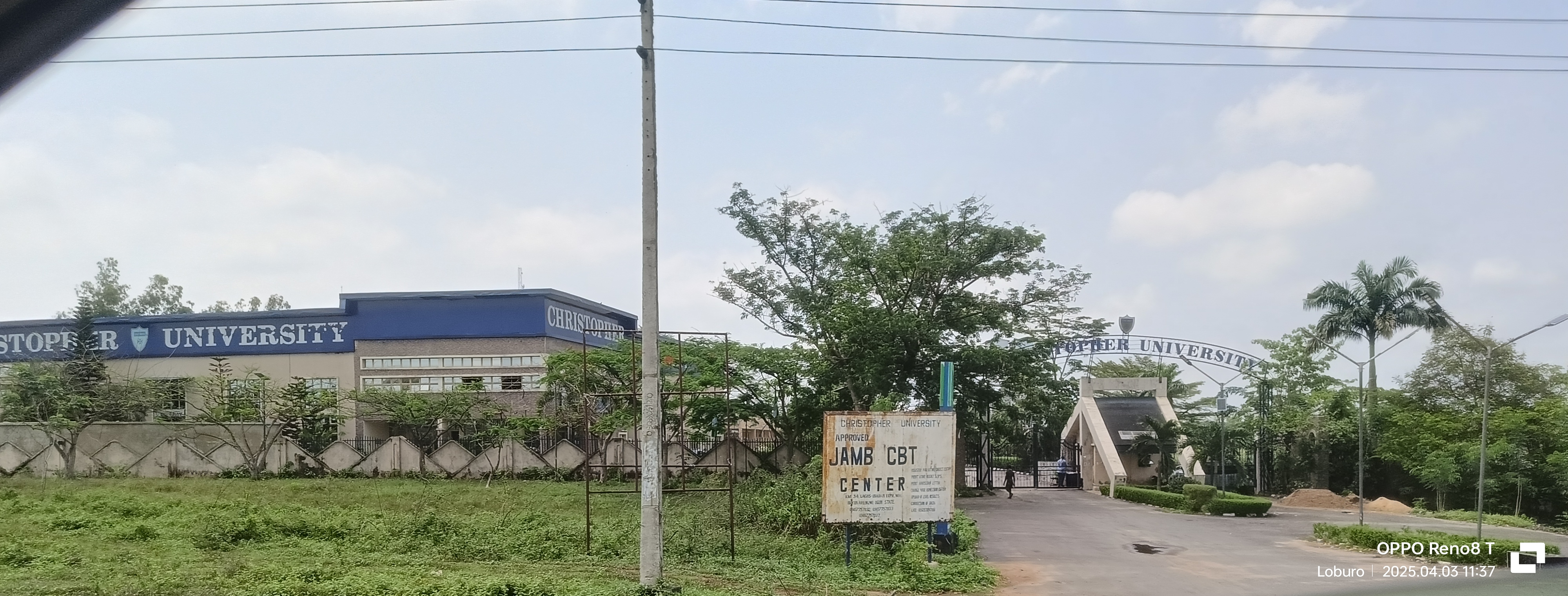
- Type: Private
- Established: 2015
- Location: Mowe, Ogun State, Nigeria; 6.8298361°N 3.4756138°E
- Website: Official website

Christopher University is located in Mowe, Ogun State, Nigeria. It was founded in 2015 and is recognized by Nigeria's National Universities Commission.

== Programmes and courses ==
According to the Vice-Chancellor of the university, Prof. Olatunji Oyelana, the university currently offers 25 academic programmes across six schools. These include;

- Accounting/Finance
- Banking/Finance
- Business Administration
- Economics,
- Computer Science
- Information Science and Media Studies
- Philosophy
- History & Diplomatic studies
- English language/Literature
- Marketing
- Psychology
- Mass communication
- International Relations
- Sociology
- Law
- Nursing Science
- Public Health
- Medical Laboratory Science
- Political Science.
