= Ferhan Azman =

Turkish architect

Ferhan Azman is a Turkish born architect working in London, New York City, Los Angeles, Nice and Istanbul.

== Career ==
After working on Canary Wharf she founded Azman Architects in 2003, basing the headquarters of her studio in the Hoxton district of London.

She designed the London home of Isabella Blow, which the New York Times called "a playhouse for a mad hatter". Alexander McQueen commissioned her to design his house and to create his flagship store in Conduit Street London. This was followed by the Vivienne Westwood celebrating thirty years of fashion, at the Victoria and Albert Museum. Barbican Gallery.

Ferhan Azman is a visiting tutor at the Architectural Association.

She won the competition managed by RIBA Competitions for the RIBA Bar.
