= Khadija University =

Khadija University Majia
- Type: Private
- Established: 2014
- Location: Majia, Jigawa State, 720001, Nigeria; 12.3071°N 9.4500°E
- Campus: Urban
- Website: kum.edu.ng

Khadija University (KUM) is a private university located in Majia, Jigawa State, Nigeria. It is the first private university in Jigawa State and was established to provide higher education in various academic disciplines. The university is recognized by the National Universities Commission (NUC).

== History ==
Khadija University was established in 2014 as a private institution by businessman and philanthropist Alhaji Abdulaziz Garba Namadi. The university was officially incorporated on March 13, 2018. In 2024, the Jigawa State Government approved the acquisition of Khadija University for N11 billion, transitioning it into the state's second public university.

== Faculties and programs ==
The university has three main faculties offering undergraduate

=== Faculty of Social and Management Sciences ===
- Accounting
- Criminology and Security Studies
- Economics
- Entrepreneurship
- Mass Communication

=== Faculty of Science and Computing ===
- Biology
- Chemistry
- Computer Science
- Cyber Security
- Mathematics
- Physics with Electronics
- Software Engineering

=== Faculty of Basic Medical Sciences ===
- Medical Laboratory Science
- Nursing Science
- Physiotherapy

== Admission requirements ==
The university admits students through the Unified Tertiary Matriculation Examination (UTME) and Direct Entry. The requirements include:

- UTME candidates must have a minimum score of 140.
- Candidates must have at least five O'Level credits, including English Language and Mathematics.
- Direct Entry candidates must have relevant A'Level qualifications such as IJMB, ND, or NCE.

== Tuition fees ==
As of the 2024/2025 academic session, tuition fees vary by faculty:

- Basic Medical Sciences: ₦698,000 per session
- Science and Computing: ₦588,000 per session
- Social and Management Sciences: ₦438,000 per session

Additional fees include an acceptance fee of ₦15,000, a matriculation fee of ₦20,000, and accommodation costs ranging from ₦130,000 to ₦200,000.

== Campus and facilities ==
The university provides hostel accommodation, lecture halls, laboratories, and a digital library to support academic and extracurricular activities.

== Accreditation ==
Khadija University is accredited by the National Universities Commission (NUC), which regulates and approves university programs in Nigeria.

== Vice chancellors ==
- Professor Hassana Sani Darma (2021 - 2023) The pioneer vice chancellor.
- Professor Umar Muhammad Sani Indabawa (2023 - till date) Acting vice chancellor.

== See also ==
- List of universities in Nigeria
- Education in Nigeria
