= Nigerian Army University Biu =

Public university in Biu, Nigeria

Coordinates: 10.6191°N 12.1611°E

- Type: Public
- Established: 2018
- Founder: Federal Republic of Nigeria
- Vice-Chancellor: Prof.Lawan Bala Buratai
- Location: No 1, Gombe road, PMB 1500, Biu, Borno State, Nigeria., Biu, Borno State., Nigeria
- Website: https://naub.edu.ng/

Nigerian Army University Biu (NAUB) is a Nigerian Public tertiary institution located in Biu, Borno State, Nigeria. It is a research higher institution for innovation and technology for the Nigerian Army. It was established in 2018.

The university is managed by the Nigerian Army which has 75% civilian and 25% military and paramilitary. It is the first Nigerian Army university and Africa's first green university.

== Background ==
Nigerian Army University Biu was established by the federal government of Nigeria to be a centre of innovation and technological development for the Nigerian defence sector and the nation to meet the ever-changing and rapid development in the dynamics of modern warfare. The Act to establish it was passed in 2018.

The university is located in Biu, Borno State. It focuses on research and technological innovation in the defence sector with particular emphasis on local challenges in asymmetrical warfare in Nigeria, Africa and the world at large.

=== Vice Chancellors ===
- On 28 May 2019, the Nigerian Chief of Army Staff (COAS), Lt-Gen. Tukur Yusuf Buratai approved the appointment of Prof. David Iliya Malgwi as vice chancellor of Nigerian Army University Biu (NAUB)
- On 23 March 2020, the appointment of Prof. Kyari Mohammed was approved as Vice Chancellor of Nigerian Army University
- On April 16, 2025, Prof Lawan Bala Buratai was appointed as VC NAUB

== Courses offered ==
- Mechanical engineering
- Civil Engineering
- Building
- English Language
- Mathematics
- Physics
- Biology
- International Relations
- Information Sciences
- Information Technology
- Computer Science
- Cyber Security
- Software Engineering
- Economics
- Political Science
- Electrical Electronic
- Military History
- B.A English
- B.A Arabic
- B.A History
- Criminology and Security Studies
- International Relations
- Transport and Logistics Management

Student Accommodation

The Nigerian Army University Biu Hostel is located right inside the Nigerian Army Barracks Biu, providing adequate security for students of the institution.
