= Emmanuel Alayande College of Education =

University of Education in Oyo, Nigeria

Emmanuel Alayande University of Education
- EAUED
- Motto: Knowledge, Truth and Service
- Established: 1896
- Affiliations: Ekiti State University, Ado-Ekiti
- Vice-Chancellor: Prof. Olanrewaju A. Olaniyan
- Academic staff: Arts Education, Science Education, Social Science Education, Specialised and Professional Education, Vocational, Innovation and Engineering Education
- Students: over 5,000
- Location: Erelu, Oyo, Oyo, Oyo State, Nigeria; 7°52′42″N 3°54′29″E
- Colours: Blue, White, Green and Gold
- Website: https://eauedoyo.edu.ng/

Emmanuel Alayande University of Education formerly known as Emmanuel Alayande College of Education and Oyo State College of Education also known as EAUED is a state-owned University of Education located in Oyo, Oyo State, Nigeria but recently changed to a university by the Oyo State Governor, Engineer Seyi Makinde in 2022.

== Historical background ==
At inception, St. Andrews College, Oyo produced holders of Grade II Teachers Certificate while the Divinity Course for training church ministers was added to the curriculum between 1910 and 1942, and the ownership of the college was transferred from CMS, London to the Church of Nigeria (Anglican Communion).

In 1977, Government took over the control and administration of all schools in the Nigerian Federation and with this development, the Church of Nigeria was divested of her Proprietorship of the college. However, the St. Andrews College Old Boys Association (SACOBA) interest and by extension that of the Church, in the growth and development of St. Andrews did not wane. Thus, in response to SACOBA's petition, the erstwhile Oyo State Government upgraded the Institution to NCE campus in 1980 and to the full-fledged College of Education in 1985.

However, on 2 December 2022, Governor Seyi Makinde of Oyo State transformed the status of the institution from being a College of Education to a University of Education.

== Main Campus ==
Emmanuel Alayande College of Education, Oyo, is located in the South Western part of the ancient City of Oyo, specifically in the Erelu Area. The college operates on two campuses in Oyo, with the main campus situated in Erelu at the South Western part of Oyo.

As an autonomous institution, EACOED's primary goal is to produce highly qualified teachers through courses leading to the award of the Nigeria Certificate in Education (NCE). The academic structure includes six faculties.

== Event and protest in school ==
The Oyo state government closed the school in June 2017 due to student protests concerning welfare spending in the school. On July 17, governor Abiola Ajimobi ordered the reopening of the school after meeting with the governing council, management and students.

== Programmes ==
1. Bachelor of Science Education (B.sc Edu)
2. Bachelor of Science(B.sc)
3. Bachelor of Arts (B.A Edu)
4. Yoruba Language Proficiency Programme (YLP)
5. Ekiti State University (affiliated Degree Programmes)

== Upgrade to University of Education ==
On March 17, 2021, Governor Seyi Makinde of Oyo State granted approval for the elevation of Emmanuel Alayande College of Education, Oyo, to the status of a comprehensive university specializing in education. The announcement was made by, the Commissioner for Education, Science, and Technology in the state, with this development the institution will be able to award degree certificate and the certificate was handover to the school council by the NUC Executive Secretary, Prof. Abubakar Rasheed. The certificate was handed over to engineer Seyi Makinde the Executive Governor of Oyo state.

== Educational Leadership and Administration. ==
- Acting Provost - Dr Nelson Aderemi Oyewo
- Acting Deputy Provost - Dr. Mrs. R.o. Owoade
- Acting Registrar - Mrs Olubunmi Siju Asunmo
- Acting Bursar - Mr Emmanuel Oluninyo Adegoke.
- The College Librarian - Dr Serifat Mojisola Asiru

== Ranking ==
Emmanuel Alayande University of Education is ranked 257th in Nigeria institution as at last release before the college formally got upgraded to University status.

== Admission Requirement ==
Applicants seeking admission to Emanuel Alayande College of Education must have chosen the school in JAMB UTME and have a minimum score of 100, with 5 credits in O'level be it WAEC, NECO or NABTEB. English and Mathematics And 3 other relevant subjects.

== Vice chancellor appointment ==
Governor Seyi Makinde of Oyo state on the 10th of August 2023 appointed a Vice Vhancellor for the University.
