= Adamawa State Polytechnic =

State Polytechnic in Nigeria

Coordinates: 9°28′1″N 12°1′58″E

- Type: Public
- Accreditation: National Board for Technical Education
- Affiliations: University of Maiduguri
- Location: Yola, Adamawa State, Nigeria
- Campus: Multiple sites

Adamawa State Polytechnic is a tertiary educational institution in Yola, Adamawa State, Nigeria. It was established in 1991 through a merger of the College of Preliminary Studies Yola and the Staff Development Institute, Numan. The new polytechnic provides national diploma programs in computer science, statistics, accountancy, business studies and secretarial studies. The polytechnic, run by the State government, is accredited by the National Board for Technical Education. The institution has become affiliated with the University of Maiduguri for the purpose of running degree programmes.

== History ==
In 2007, the polytechnic hired 200 staff of carefully balanced ethnic and religious composition. After working unpaid for two years the group took the state government to court asking for payment of salary and benefits. In December 2009, the chief judge hearing the case advised that those carrying out torture and assault on the lecturers should desist. In November 2008, a panel reviewing the Polytechnic issued a severely critical report and called on Governor Murtala Nyako to take action to bail the institution out of its academic paralysis. The panel noted that the polytechnic had only three accredited programs out of the 33 it offered, and described "apathy, uneasiness" among staff and "a perception of ethnicity and nepotism." In December 2009, the State government authorized N20.1 million to be spent on the library complex and the lecturers' residence as well as the school's fencing, which had been abandoned since 2001.

In March 2021, during the course of celebrations after their final examinations, students destroyed facilities in the main campus of the institution. This led to a shutdown of the school on 25 March. The institution was reopened on 26 April 2021. Students were surcharged for the damages, and only those who paid the levies were allowed back to school to finish their examinations or process their results.

== Governing Council ==
The highest decision and policy-making body of the Polytechnic. The council members are appointed by the Executive Governor of Adamawa state. The Council consists of the chairman who shall be an indigene of the state and a representative of one of the societies of engineering in the state representative of one of the Nigeria Universities among other representatives of the Polytechnic Council.

== Staff ==
Former Vice Chancellor, Professor Kaleptapwa Farauta.

Dr Stephen Lagu is the Acting Vice Chancellor

Chairman of the University Council, Dr Awwal Tukur.

Dr Stephen LaguThe new Acting VC was born in Gulak Local Government Area in 1959. He possesses a BEd in English Language from the University of Maiduguri, a master's degree from that institution in 2005, and a doctorate from Modibbo Adama University in 2016. He once served as Dean of the ADSU Faculty of Education.

== Library ==
The polytechnic library is located on the main campus with information resources that meet the information needs of students and staff of the school. The Library is managed by a Chief Librarian Mrs. Mary Chiwar since 2020 till date. the library grouped its users into four groups adult users, student users, and special interest Users. The Library has both physical and digital collections, the digital services are provided by the E- Library section.

== Courses offered ==
The following are courses offered by the institution;

- Accountancy
- Agricultural and Bio-Environmental Engineering/Technology
- Business Administration and Management
- Civil engineering
- Computer science
- Mass communication
- Mechanical engineering
- Office Technology and Management
- Public administration
- Quantity surveying
- Science Laboratory Technology
- Social Development
- Statistics
- Surveying and Geo-informatics
- Urban and Regional Planning

== Campus ==
The institution is located in three campuses. The main campus is in Jimeta -Yola, the capital city of Adamawa State. Jambutu campus is also in Jimeta while the Numan campus is located in the Numan Local Government Area of the State.

== Affiliations ==
The institution also has affiliations with Ahmadu Bello University, Zaria and Federal University Dutse, Jigawa State.

== See also ==
- List of polytechnics in Nigeria
