= PAMO University of Medical Sciences =

Nigerian private university in River state

PAMO University of Medical Sciences Nigeria’s First Private Medical University, PAMO, Rivers State - side view.jpg
- Motto: Excellence for the good of all
- Type: Private research university
- Chancellor: Gen. Abdulsalami Abubakar, GCFR
- Vice-Chancellor: Prof. Smith I Jaja
- Location: Port Harcourt, Nigeria; 4°51′37″N 7°06′10″E
- Campus: Urban
- Website: new.pums.edu.ng

PAMO University of Medical Sciences is a private medical university located in Port Harcourt, Rivers State, Nigeria. The University was established in 2017 as the first private medical university in Nigeria. PAMO University of Medical Sciences was founded by the former governor of Rivers State, Dr Sir Peter Odili. In 2017, the university appointed Former Nigerian Head of State, General Abdulsalami Abubakar, as its Chairman of the Governing Council and Board of Trustees.

== Faculties ==
The University currently has three faculties, namely:

=== Faculty of Clinical Sciences. ===
- Medicine and Surgery.

=== Faculty of Basic Medical Sciences ===
- Anatomy
- Physiology
- Biochemistry
- Human Nutrition and dietetics

=== Faculty of Allied health sciences ===
- Nursing science
- Physiotherapy
- Medical laboratory science
- Radiography
- Pharmacology.

== Teaching Hospital ==
The University Governing council in 2023 unveiled the PAMO university hospital.

== Matriculation ==
On the 18th of March, the school matriculated 198 student to the school, making it the 7th matriculation of the school.

== Convocation/Induction ==
On the 19th of December 2023, the school announced the celebration and convocation ceremony for the first set of graduating medical students at the University.
