= Anchor University =

Private institution in Nigeria

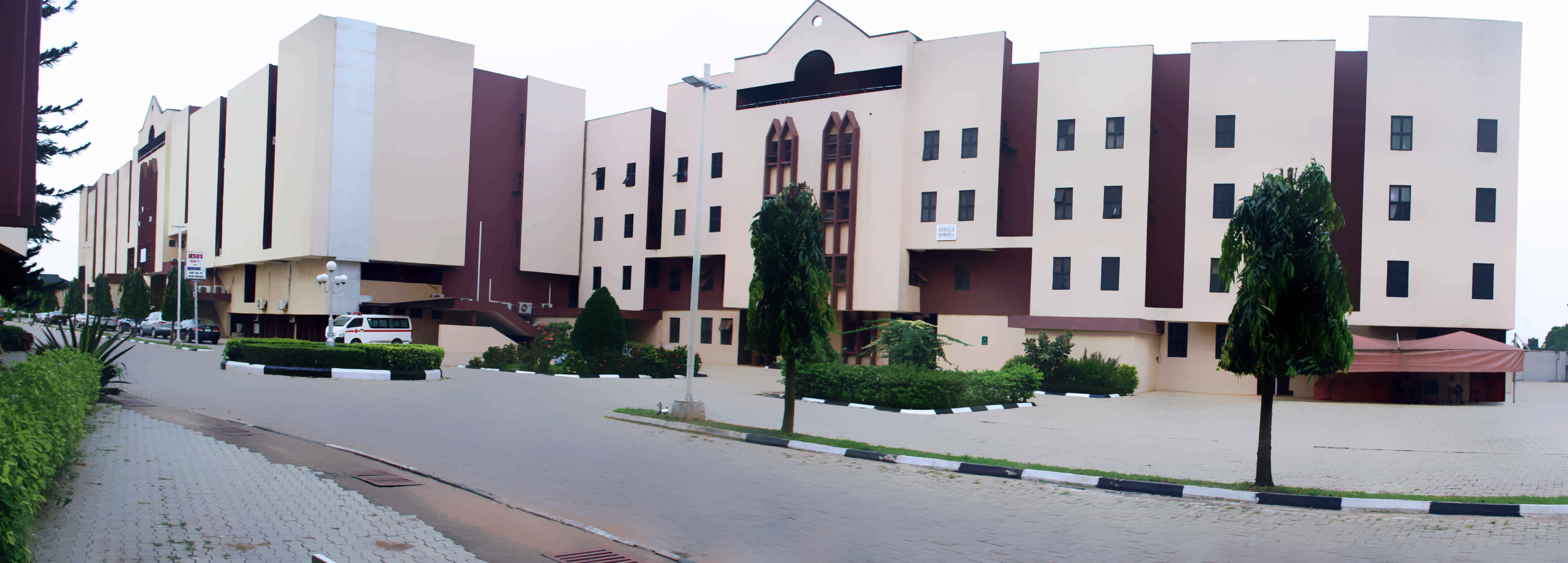
- Motto: Character, Competence, Courage
- Type: Private
- Established: September 2014
- Chancellor: William Kumuyi
- Vice-Chancellor: Samuel Oye Bandele
- Location: Ayobo-Ipaja, Lagos State, Nigeria; 6.8298361°N 3.4756138°E
- Website: aul.edu.ng

The Anchor University is a private Christian university owned by the Deeper Christian Life Ministry. The university is located at Ayobo, Ipaja, Lagos State, southwestern Nigeria. The Vice Chancellor is Professor Samuel Oye Bandele and he assumed office in February 2022.

== History ==
The process of founding Anchor University was billed for September 2012 but suffered a huge setback as the representatives of the NUC coming for final inspection and approval of their multi-billion projects were in the ill-fated Dana Air crash. Professor Celestine Onwuliri, who was the leader of the team and husband of a serving government minister and an executive director with the Nigerian Universities Commission was among the over 157 victims that died in the Dana Air crash which occurred on Sunday, June 3, 2012.

Construction began in 2013. The university was founded in 2014 by Deeper Christian Life Ministry. It was approved by the Nigerian University Commission (NUC) on Wednesday, 2 November 2016.

The school commenced lectures in three faculties in February 2017 with 102 students registered across 15 different courses.

== Faculties ==
There are seven faculties in the university:

- Faculty of Humanities
- Faculty of Science
- Faculty of Social and Management Sciences
- Faculty of Law
- Faculty of Environmental Science
- Faculty of Basic and Allied Medical Science
- Faculty of Education

== NUC approval ==
- Faculty Of Humanities
- Faculty Of Science
- Faculty Of Social & Management Sciences
- Faculty of Law
- Faculty of Environmental Science
- Faculty of Basic and Allied Medical Sciences
- Faculty of Education

== Programmes ==
(a) Faculty of Humanities

- B.A. History & Diplomatic Studies
- B.A. English & Literary Studies
- B.A. Christian Religious Studies
- B.A. French

(b) Faculty of Social and Management Sciences

- B.Sc. Accounting
- B.Sc. Business Administration
- B.Sc. Economics
- B.Sc. Political Science
- B.Sc. Mass Communication
- B.Sc. International Relations
- B.Sc. Banking and Finance

(c) Faculty of Natural and Applied Sciences

- B.Sc. Biology
- B.Sc. Microbiology
- B.Sc. Biochemistry
- B.Sc. Mathematics
- B.Sc. Computer Science
- B.Sc Software Engineering
- B.Sc. Physics
- B.Sc. Chemistry
- B.Sc. Industrial Chemistry
- B.Sc. Information Technology
- B.Sc. Biotechnology
- B.Sc. Physics with Electronics
- B.Sc. Applied Geophysics
- B.Sc. Geology
- B.Sc. (Ed) Chemistry
- B.Sc. (Ed) Biology
- B.Sc. (Ed) Computer Science
- B.Sc. (Ed) Mathematics
- B.Sc. (Ed) Physics

(d) Faculty of Law

- LL.B Law

(e) Faculty of Environmental Science

- B.Sc. Architecture

(f) Faculty of Basic and Allied Medical Sciences

- B.Sc. Nursing
- B.Sc. Medical Laboratory Science
- B.Sc. Anatomy
- B.Sc Public Health

== Anchor University Library ==
The central university library is housed in the ground floor of the administrative block. It holds over 23,000 books and provides access to database subscriptions and plagiarism software. The central library also has a E-library and staff section. The library is segmented into different sections, the serial section and circulation section also consist of different books and journals. Faculty libraries for Law, Architecture, Nursing and Medical Laboratory Science are also available on campus.

The university librarian is Dr. Bolanle Fagbola. She assumed office in November 2024.

=== Development of Library app ===
There is a development of Library app in the school that made the cataloging to be very easy to access.

== See also ==
- Academic libraries in Nigeria
