= Khalifa Isyaku Rabiu University =

Private university in Kano State, Nigeria, established in 2022

Khalifa Isyaku Rabiu University, Kano
- Type: Private university
- Established: 2022
- Founders: Khalifa Isyaku Rabiu Education Foundation
- Accreditation: National Universities Commission
- Vice-Chancellor: Professor Abdulrashid Garba
- Location: Kano, Kano State, Nigeria
- Campus: Urban

Khalifa Isyaku Rabiu University, Kano (KHAIRUN) is a private university located in Kano State, Nigeria. It was established in 2022 following approval from the National Universities Commission (NUC). The university is named after the late Islamic scholar and philanthropist Khalifa Isyaku Rabiu. The institution provides programmes in science, computing, engineering, and allied health disciplines.

== History ==
The university received its operational licence from the National Universities Commission in April 2022.

The institution was founded by the Khalifa Isyaku Rabiu Education Foundation, building upon the educational legacy associated with Sheikh Isyaku Rabiu.

Academic activities began in the 2023/2024 academic session with a limited number of undergraduate programmes across science, computing, engineering, and allied health disciplines. The university continues to expand its academic structure and facilities.

== Location ==
The main campus of Khalifa Isyaku Rabiu University is located along BUK Road, opposite Gadon Kaya City Gate, in Gwale Local Government Area of Kano State, Nigeria.

== Faculties ==
- Faculty of Science and Computing
- Faculty of Engineering
- Faculty of Allied Medical Sciences

=== Selected Programs ===
Some of the undergraduate programmes offered include:

- Computer Science
- Cybersecurity
- Software Engineering
- Electrical and Electronics Engineering
- Mechatronics Engineering
- Biochemistry
- Microbiology
- Biotechnology
- Mathematics
- Medical Laboratory Science
- Radiography
- Nursing Science

== Administration ==
The administrative structure of Khalifa Isyaku Rabiu University follows the conventional Nigerian university system, consisting of:

- Chancellor
- Governing Council
- Vice-Chancellor
- Deputy Vice-Chancellor(s)
- Registrar
- Bursar
- University Librarian

The pioneer Vice-Chancellor is Professor Abdulrashid Garba.
