= Peaceland University =

Private university in Enugu, Nigeria

- Enugu
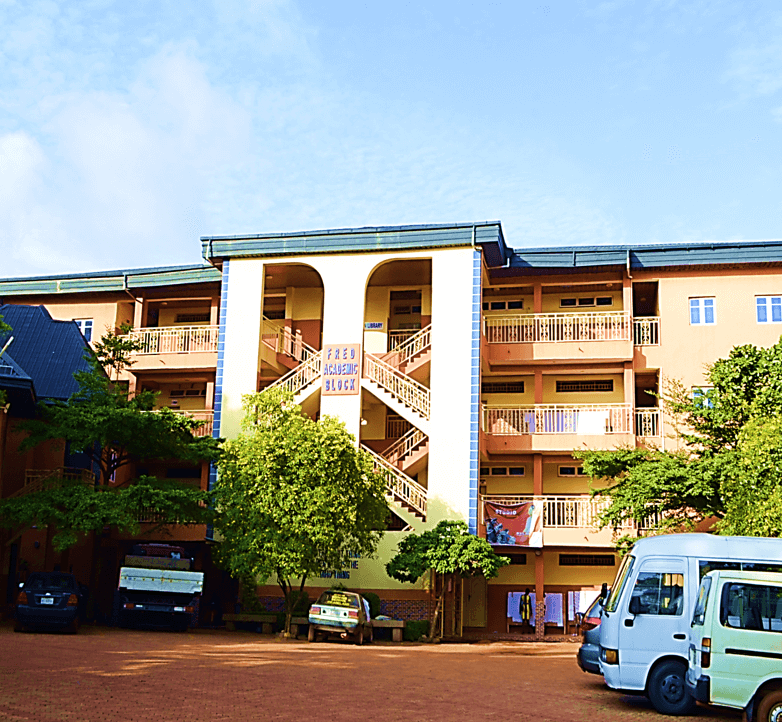
- Motto: Integral Human Development
- Type: Private
- Established: 2023
- Chancellor: Professor Felix Ugwuozor
- Vice-Chancellor: Professor Leonard Chidi Ilechukwu
- Location: Enugu, Enugu, Nigeria; 6°26′16.71″N 7°30′26.77″E
- Campus: 53 hectares (130 acres); Urban
- Colours: blue and gold
- Nickname: PeaceLand Uni
- Mascot: White Dove
- Website: peacelanduni.edu.ng
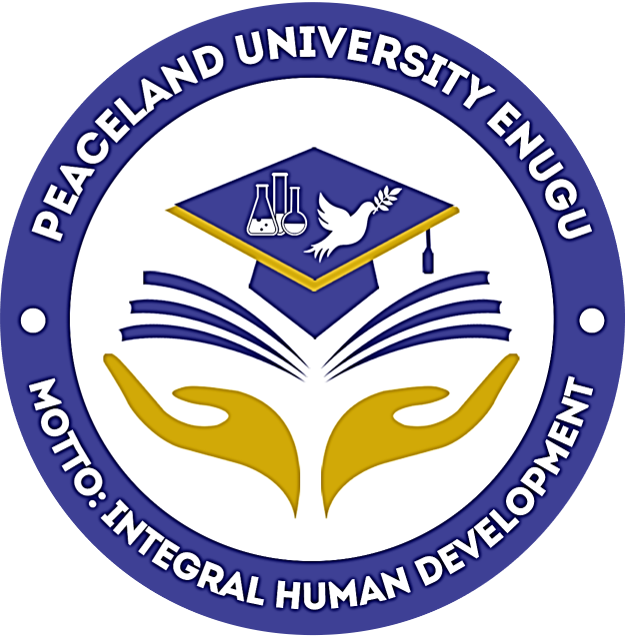

Peaceland University, commonly referred to as Peaceland Uni, is a private university located in Enugu, Enugu State, Nigeria. Founded in 2023, it evolved from Peaceland College of Education.

The transition to a university was supported by the Pia and Alfred Meier-Knüsel Foundation in Switzerland and their Nigerian partner, FREDYPIA Developmental and Education Foundation.

== Staff ==
In June 2023, Peaceland University appointed Arthur Eze as its first Pro-Chancellor. Eze is known for his philanthropic activities in Nigeria.

In November 2024, Peaceland University appointed Rev. Fr. Prof. Felix Ugwuozor as its Pro-Chancellor. Ugwuozor, a priest of the Catholic Diocese of Enugu, brings significant academic and leadership experience to the role.

Prior to this appointment, he served as the Acting Deputy Provost and Director of Postgraduate Programmes at Peaceland College of Education, Enugu. His leadership is expected to guide the university’s development and academic growth.

Dr. Leonard Chidi Ilechukwu serves as the Vice Chancellor of Peaceland University, with extensive experience in higher education administration, academic leadership, and research. Dr. Ilechukwu has been instrumental in advancing the university's academic programs and infrastructure. His tenure has contributed to enhancing the university's reputation for educational excellence. Dr. Ilechukwu is committed to expanding the university's influence, improving academic standards, and promoting innovation and research across all disciplines.
