= Abdulkadir Kure University =

Public university in Minna, Nigeria

Coordinates: 9.5988°N 6.5692°E

- Motto: Knowledge and Innovation for Sustainable Development
- Type: Public
- Established: 2023; 3 years ago
- Chancellor: Prof Mohammed Kuta Yahaya
- Vice-Chancellor: Prof Mohammed Aliyu Paiko
- Location: Opposite Army Barracks Paiko Road Minna, Niger State, Nigeria
- Campus: Urban
- Colours: Green
- Nickname: Aku Minna
- Website: akum.edu.ng
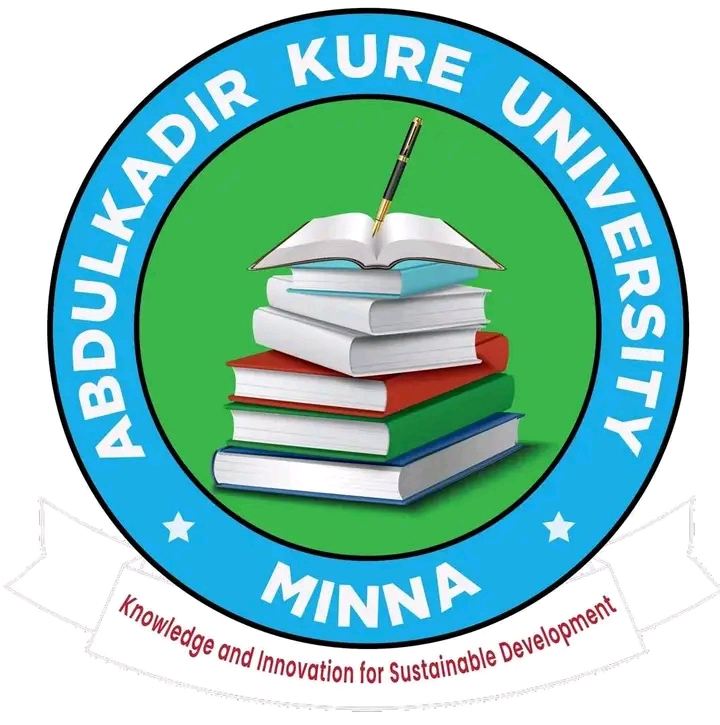

Abdulkadir Kure University is a university in Niger State, Nigeria. Owned by the Niger State Government. It is named after Engr. Abdulkadir Kure, who served as the governor of Niger State from 1999 to 2007. Established in 2023, it was primarily a university of education and has since been converted into a full-fledged conventional university.

== Faculties and departments ==
Faculties and Departments at Abudulkadir Kure University.

- Faculty Of Education
- Department of Technical and Vocational Education
- Department of Arts and social Sciences Education
- Department of Science Education
