= Ayobo, Lagos =

Suburb in Lagos State

Ayobo (also known as Igbo Ilogbo-Ayobo) is a suburb in Alimosho local government area of Lagos State, south-western Nigeria. Anchor University, Lagos is located there.

Ayobo is the last town in Lagos bordering Aiyetiro, Ogun State. Ayobo is a town with about 10 sub-towns under it. Megida, Isefun, Olorunisola, Bada, Sabo, Kande-Ijon, Orisumbare-Ijon, Jagundeyi, Alaja, etc.

Megida and Isefun are the most prominent towns under Ayobo. Megida is the capital and commercial city of Ayobo, the home of the Anchor University. While Isefun/Kande-Ijon are the homes to one of the modern Lagos water ways (under construction).

Ayobo shares Local Council Development Area with Ipaja ( Ipaja/Ayobo Local Council Development Area).
