= Nigeria Police Academy Wudil =

Police academy in Kano, Nigeria

- Type: Academy
- Established: 1988
- Location: Kano State, Nigeria
- Website: polac.edu.ng

The Nigerian Police Academy Wudil is a federal government-owned institution that was established in 1988 to train police officers in Nigeria. It is located in Wudil Kano State, Nigeria, and offers undergraduate and postgraduate degree programs in law enforcement and related fields.

The academy is accredited by the National Universities Commission (NUC) and is recognized as a degree-awarding institution.

== Courses ==
The academy offers a range of programs including a four-year Bachelor of Science (B.Sc.) degree in various fields such as:

- B.Sc. in Accounting
- B.Sc. in Biology
- B.Sc. in Biochemistry
- B.Sc. in Computer Science
- B.Sc. in Economics
- B.A. in History and International Studies
- B.Sc. in Mathematics
- B.Sc. in Physics
- B.Sc. in Political Science
- B.Sc. in Psychology
- B.Sc. in Sociology

The Nigerian Police Academy is also known for its rigorous training programs for police officers, which are designed to equip them with the necessary skills to perform their duties effectively. The academy has a reputation for producing highly trained superior and professional police officers who have gone on to serve in various capacities within the Nigerian Police Force.
