= Skyline University =

Nigerian private university

Skyline University Nigeria
- Type: Private
- Established: 2018
- Chancellor: Sanusi Lamido Sanusi
- Vice-Chancellor: Dr. Ajith Kumar Vadakki Veetil
- Administrative staff: Abubakar Sadiq Ismail (DoMC)
- Location: Kano City, Kano State, Nigeria
- Campus: Urban
- Colours: Red; White; Blue
- Nickname: SUN
- Website: www.sun.edu.ng

Skyline University is a privately owned University in Kano, Nigeria. Skyline University Nigeria was established in 2018. The federal government of Nigeria gave the approval to start up the private owned institution in May, 2018. Skyline University Nigeria is the first private University in Kano, Nigeria and also the second private University in North-West region of Nigeria.

== Academic Division ==
From the establishment of the new institution in 2018, Skyline University Nigeria has grown into five (5) different faculties with departments attached to the faculties.

There are:

=== School of Science and Information Technology ===
- BSc Computer Science
- BSc Biochemistry
- BSc Geology
- BSc Data Science
- BSc Microbiology
- BSc Cyber Security
- BSc Software Engineering
- BSc Artificial Intelligence

=== School of Arts, Management and Social Science ===
- BSc Mass Communication
- BSc Entrepreneurship and Innovation
- BSc Economics
- BSc Business Administration
- BSc Accounting
- BSc International Relations
- BSc Islamic Economics and Finance

=== School of Basic Medical Sciences ===
- Doctor of Physiotherapy
- B.NSc Nursing Sciences
- BSc Basic Medical Science
- BSc Public Health

=== School of Legal Studies ===
- LL.B. (Bachelor of Laws)

=== School of Post Graduate Studies ===
M.sc. Programs

- M.sc. Economics
- M.sc. Entrepreneurship
- M.sc. International Relations and Diplomatic Studies
- M.sc. Forensic Accounting
- M.sc. Mass Communication
- MBA Business Administration
- M.sc. Computer Science
- M.sc. Microbiology
- M.sc. Software Engineering
- M.sc. Biochemistry

Professional Masters

- Masters in Accounting and Finance
- Masters in Management
- Masters in International Relations
- Masters in Communication Studies
- Masters in Economics
- Masters in Entrepreneurship

Ph.D. Programs

- Ph.D. Economics
- Ph.D. Entrepreneurship
- Ph.D. International Relations
- Ph.D. Accounting
- Ph.D. Mass Communication
- Ph.D. Management
- Ph.D. Computer Science
- Ph.D. Microbiology
- Ph.D. Software Engineering
- Ph.D. Biochemistry

PGD Programs

- PGD International Studies
- PGD Communication Studies
- PGD Accounting and Finance
- PGD Economics
- PGD Entrepreneurship
- PGD Management

== Vice Chancellors ==
The pioneer vice chancellor of Skyline University, Nigeria is Professor Sudhakar Kota, he matriculated the pioneer students of the institution, a total of 82 students in 2019, the matriculation witnessed some popular figures in Nigeria including the Emir of Kano.

In 2021, Skyline University Nigeria announced the arrival of a new vice-chancellor after the tenure of Professor Sudhakar Kota was over, the new vice-chancellor announced was Ajith Kumar Vadakki Veetil, an expatriate Doctor from the Skyline University College. He resumed office on Wednesday 27th, January 2021 to replace the former Vice-Chancellor Professor Sudhakar Kota.

== Gallery ==
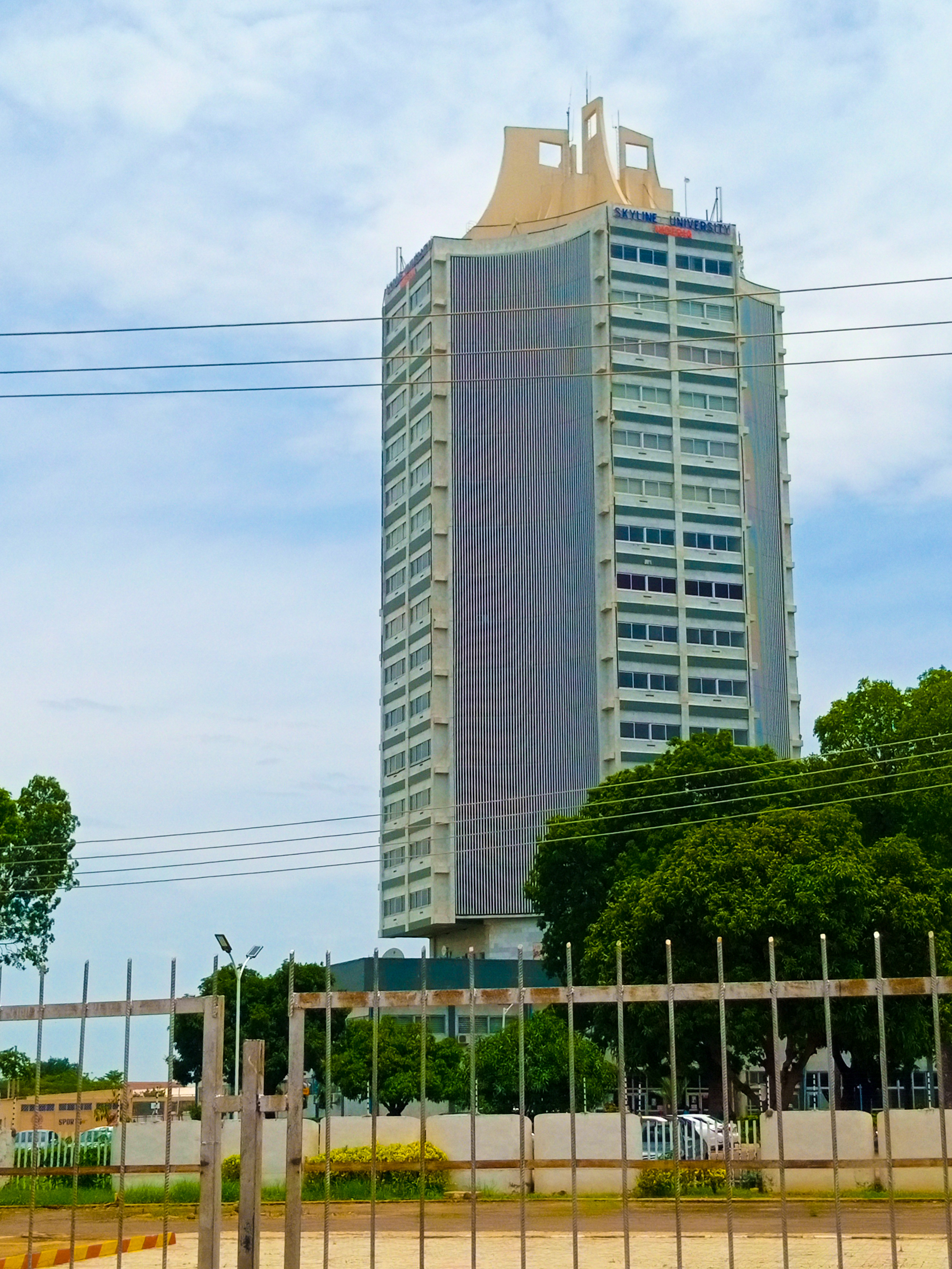
Skyline university
