= Agricultural Science and Technology Indicators =

Studies in agriculture research and development

The Agricultural Science and Technology Indicators (ASTI) is a comprehensive source of information on agricultural research and development (R&D) statistics.

== Overview ==
ASTI compiles, analyzes, and publicizes data on institutional developments, investments, and capacity trends in agricultural R&D in low- and middle-income countries worldwide. ASTI has published a broad set of country briefs and regional synthesis reports that describe general human and financial capacity trends in agricultural R&D at national, regional, and global levels.

ASTI comprises a network of national, regional, and international agricultural R&D agencies and is hosted and facilitated by the International Food Policy Research Institute (IFPRI). ASTI is currently funded by the Bill & Melinda Gates Foundation.

== Importance of agricultural R&D data ==
Greater investment in agricultural research could make a significant contribution to increasing agricultural production to the levels required to feed the world’s growing population. Furthermore, additional investments in agricultural research are required to address emerging challenges, such as increasing weather variability, adaptation to climate change, water scarcity, and increased price volatility in global markets. Despite this growing attention to the agricultural sector and the role of agricultural research, many low- and middle-income countries continue to struggle with serious and deepening capacity and funding constraints in their agricultural research and higher education systems.

Quantitative information is fundamental to understanding the contribution of agricultural science and technology (S&T) to agricultural growth. Indicators derived from such information allow the performance, inputs, and outcomes of agricultural S&T systems to be measured, monitored, and benchmarked. These indicators assist S&T stakeholders in formulating policy, setting priorities, and undertaking strategic planning, monitoring, and evaluation. They also provide information to governments, policy research institutes, universities, and private-sector organizations involved in public debate on the state of agricultural S&T at national, regional, and international levels.

== Activities ==
ASTI’s recent work has primarily focused on the following activities:

- initiating institutional survey rounds in Subsaharan Africa, Latin America and the Caribbean, the Asia Pacific, and the Middle East and North Africa;
- developing and maintaining a comprehensive, user-friendly website offering access to primary data sources; and
- building a network of national, regional and international partners to facilitate data collection efforts and the dissemination of outputs.

=== Products ===
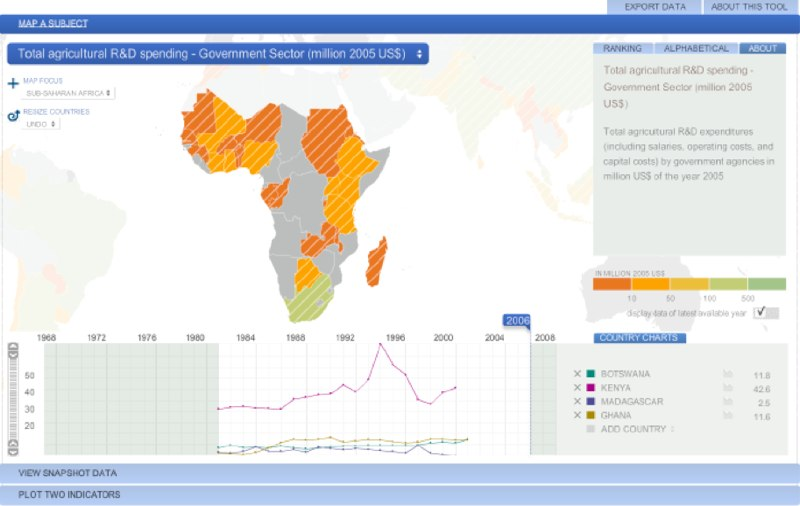
Screenshot of the ASTI Datatool

In 2009 ASTI launched a web application that allows its users to display different ASTI indicators by country and plot two indicators against each other.

ASTI’s current indicators include

- trend data on agricultural scientist numbers and total investments in agricultural research by the government, higher education, and nonprofit sectors of developing countries; and
- additional short-term or yearly data on numbers of scientists by degree status and gender, support-staff numbers, funding sources, categories of spending (salaries, operating costs, and capital investments), and research focus by agricultural subsector and theme, as well as by crop and livestock item.

Publications include regional and global analyses of agricultural R&D investments, and country briefs and fact sheets presenting national data.

=== How does ASTI collect its data? ===
ASTI’s methodology is unique in that it combines first-hand data from a wide range of agricultural R&D agencies in low- and middle-income countries with relevant, secondary data on high-income countries for comparative purposes.

ASTI datasets are collected and processed using internationally accepted definitions and statistical procedures developed by the Organisation for Economic Co-operation (OECD) and the United Nations Educational, Science, and Cultural Organization (UNESCO). ASTI relies on its in-country partners to identify all agencies involved in agricultural R&D, to disseminate ASTI survey forms to them, and to coordinate the necessary follow-up.

== Results and impacts ==
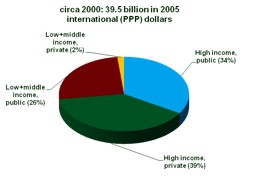
Chart showing total spending on agricultural research

In 2000, the world spent 39.5 billion dollars (in 2005 PPP prices, that is in inflation-adjusted terms) on agricultural R&D. The private sector was estimated to account for 41 percent of this total, the vast majority of which was performed in industrialized countries (96 percent). In contrast, only 6 percent of total investments in the developing world were derived from private firms.

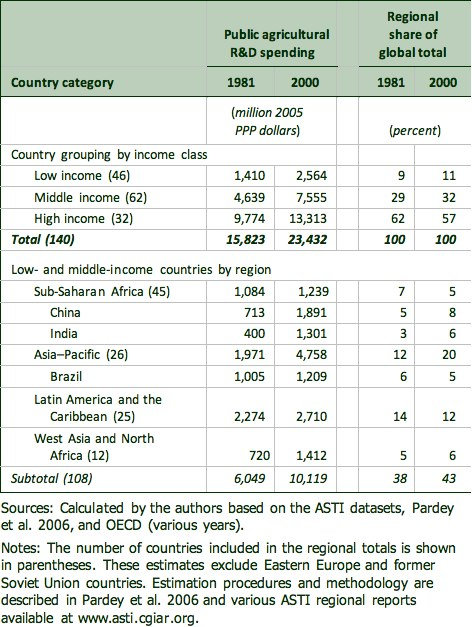
Total public agricultural research expenditures by income class and region, 1981 and 2000

In 2000, global public agricultural research investments totaled $23 billion in 2005 PPP dollars. This sum represents a 47 percent increase over the 1981 total of $16 billion. Although spending by the high-income countries as a whole continued to grow in absolute terms, their share of global spending decreased from 62 to 57 percent over the 1981-2000 period. In contrast, the share of spending by low-income countries increased from 9 to 11 percent and the share of middle-income countries increased from 29 to 32 percent over the same timeframe. Of the 2000 global total, the developing countries in the Asia-Pacific region combined invested $4.8 billion in 2000, compared to $2.7 billion for Latin America and the Caribbean, $1.2 billion for West Asia and North Africa, and $1.2 billion for Sub-Saharan Africa. Agricultural R&D spending for China and the Asia-Pacific region as a whole has grown considerably since 2000. After a period of declining investments in public agricultural R&D, the Latin America and the Caribbean region also experienced an increase in total agricultural R&D spending in 2006, comparable to the mid-1990s level.

The government sector is still providing most of the funding to agricultural research in the developing world, but funding sources can differ tremendously at the country level. Donor funding still plays an important role in most Sub-Saharan African countries and a handful of countries in Asia. In 2000/01 the main government agricultural research agencies in 23 Sub-Saharan African countries for which data were available obtained 35 percent of their funding through donor loans and contributions, which was considerably higher than the corresponding shares in the other regions. Funding generated through internally generated funds, including contractual arrangements with private and public enterprises, as well as funding by producer organizations have gained prominence in recent years across the developing world.

The institutional composition of agricultural R&D has become increasingly diversified over the past few decades. Although the government sector continues to dominate the execution of public agricultural research, the higher-education sector has gained prominence in a large number of developing countries. Despite the increasing share of the higher-education sector as a whole, the individual capacity of many individual higher-education agencies remains small. Nonprofit organizations such as producer organizations, marketing boards, foundations, and nongovernmental organizations (NGOs) are increasingly relevant elements of national and global agricultural research. Although in absolute numbers—total FTE researchers more than doubled in LAC and SSA during their respective periods—they continue to account for a small share of public agricultural research.

== Literature ==
Beintema, N.M. and G. J. Stads. 2011. African Agricultural R&D in the New Millennium: Progress for Some, Challenges for Many. IFPRI Food Policy Report. Washington, DC: International Food Policy Research Institute. (PDF-File, 1.1 MB - Accessed on May 20, 2011)

Beintema, N.M. and Stads, G.J. 2008. Measuring Agricultural Research Investments: A Revised Global Picture. ASTI Background Note. Washington, D.C.: IFPRI. (PDF-File, 657K - Accessed on March 18, 2010)

Beintema, N.M.and Di Marcantonio, F. 2009. Women's Participation in Agricultural Research and Higher Education: Key Trends in Sub-Saharan Africa. Washington, D.C.: IFPRI and Nairobi: G&D program. (PDF-File 334K - Accessed on March 18, 2010)

Stads, G.J. and Beintema, N.M. 2009. Public Agricultural Research in Latin America And The Caribbean: Investment and Capacity Trends. ASTI Synthesis Report. Washington, D.C.: International Food Policy Research Institute and Inter-American Development Bank. (PDF-File, 1.8 MB - Accessed on March 18, 2010)

Beintema, N.M. and Stads, G.J. 2008. Diversity in Agricultural Research Resources in the Asia-Pacific Region. Synthesis. Washington, D.C.: IFPRI and Bangkok, Thailand: APAARI. (PDF-File, 837K - Accessed on March 18, 2010)

Beintema, N.M. and Stads, G.J. 2008. Agricultural R&D Capacity and Investments in the Asia–Pacific Region. Research Brief No. 11. Washington, D.C.: IFPRI. (PDF-File, 211K - Accessed on March 18, 2010)

== Further information ==
The ASTI website offers a wide set of country briefs, reports, and notes as well as datasets: (Accessed on March 18, 2010)

ASTI Data tool - (Accessed on March 18, 2010)
