= Modibbo Adama Federal University of Technology, Yola =

Public university in Yola, Adamawa State, Nigeria

Modibbo Adama University, Yola
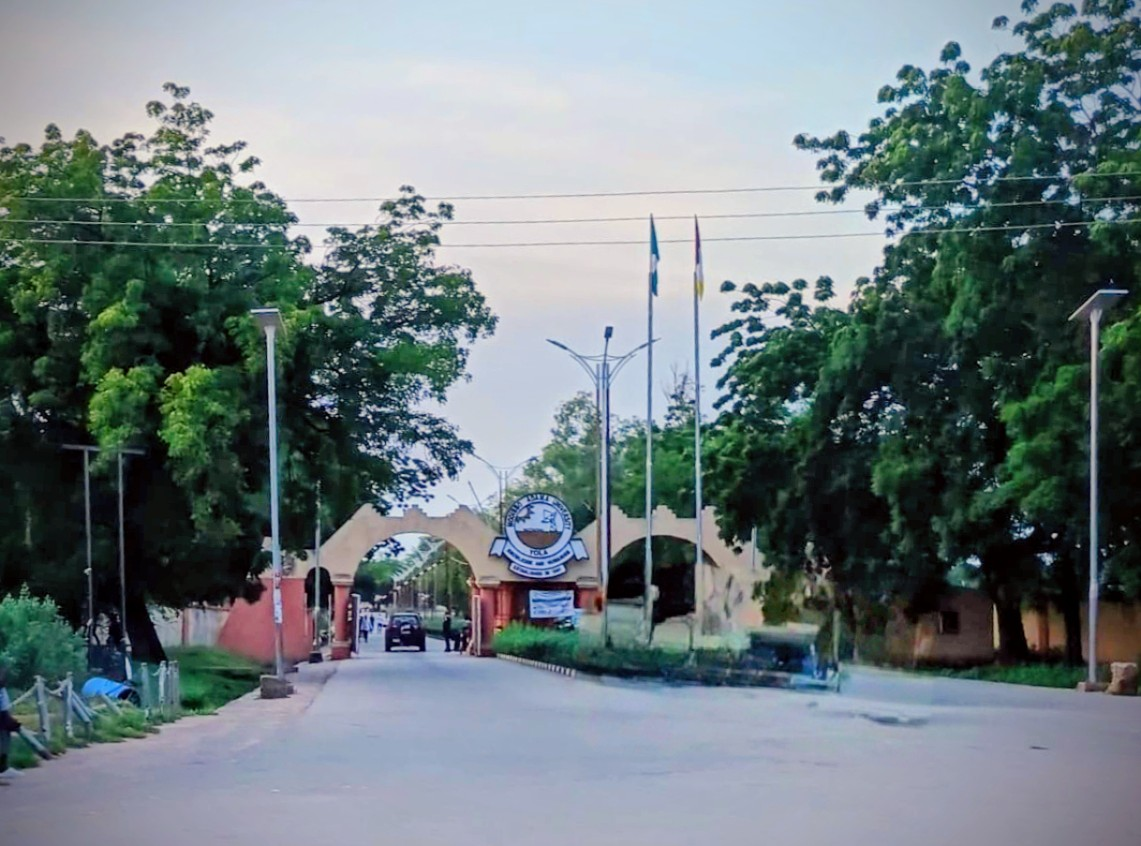
- Type: Public
- Established: 1981
- Accreditation: National Universities Commission
- Vice-Chancellor: Professor Ibrahim Umar
- Location: Girei, Adamawa State, Nigeria; 9.3489°N 12.5032°E
- Website: https://mau.edu.ng/

Modibbo Adama University, Yola is a public research university in Girei, a town in Adamawa State, Northeastern Nigeria. It is one of the four federal technology universities established with the sole purpose of advancing science-based research. The university is accredited by the National Universities Commission. The university offers associate's, bachelor's, master's, and PhD degrees. The Vice Chancellor is Ibrahim Umar.

In 1984, the University was merged with the University of Maiduguri, and it became the Modibbo Adama Campus (MACUM). Federal University of Technology, Yola.

In 1988, this merging was reversed and the university regained its autonomy. The university's name was changed to Modibbo Adama University of Technology,(MAUTECH) Yola in 2011 with the approval of the then President and Commander in Chief, Dr. Goodluck Ebele Jonathan, GCFR, and it became effective on October 1 of that year. It is named after Modibbo Adama Ibn Hassan(1809-1847), a great scholar, an erudite educationist, an outstanding leader and the founder of the Fombina Kingdom (The Present Adamawa Emirate). As the first ruler and founder of the Emirate, Modibbo Adama Ibn Hassan was one of the disciples and flag bearers of Sheikh Usman Ibn Fodio of the Sokoto Caliphate. The new name took effect from 1 October 2011. Subsequently, President Muhammadu Buhari assented to the Modibbo Adama University Yola establishment bill on 6 January 2021.

The university offers undergraduate and graduate degrees in seven schools, including the Faculty of Agriculture (FOA), the Faculty of Environmental Science (FES), the Faculty of Social and Management Sciences(FSMS), the Faculty of Physical Sciences (FPS), the Faculty of Life Sciences (FLS) the Faculty of Engineering (FOE), the Faculty of Education (FED), the College of Medical Sciences, the School of General Studies (SGS) and the School of Postgraduate Studies (SPGS).

The university offers degree programs through its centers for distance learning in addition to traditional full-time programs. Additionally, it offers Diploma and Certificate programs in over twenty programs through its Consultancy Services Unit. The university has focused mostly on teaching and research in the fields of science and technology. These have drawn a number of partnerships and collaborations with foreign universities and corporate entities, Government and non-governmental organizations to the university.

== Faculties and Programmes ==
SOCIAL AND MANAGEMENT SCIENCES

- Accounting
- Banking and Finance
- Business Management
- Management
- Information communication technology
- Artificial intelligence

EDUCATION

- Agricultural Education
- Biology Education
- Business Education
- Chemistry Education
- Construction Technology Education
- Electrical and Electronics Technology Education
- Geography Education
- Home Economics
- Mathematics Education
- Mechanical Technology Education
- Physics Education
- Statistics Education

PHYSICAL SCIENCE

- Industrial Chemistry
- Geology
- Mathematics
- Physics
- Chemistry
- Statistics
- Mathematics with Economics

LIFE SCIENCE

- Biochemistry
- Microbiology
- Zoology
- Biotechnology

AGRICULTURE

- Agriculture
- Forestry and Wildlife Management
- Fisheries
- Soil Science

COMPUTING

- Computer Science
- Operations Research
- Information Management Technology
- Information Technology
- Library and Information Science

ENVIRONMENTAL SCIENCE

- Architecture
- Building
- Industrial Design
- Surveying and Geo-Informatics
- Urban and Regional Planning

ENGINEERING

- Agricultural Engineering
- Chemical Engineering
- Civil Engineering
- Electrical and Electronic Engineering
- Food Science Technology
- Mechanical Engineering

LAW

- Common Law
- Sharia Law

COLLEGE OF MEDICAL SCIENCES

- Medicine and Surgery
- Nursing

OTHER ACADEMIC UNITS

- School of Postgraduate Studies
- Centre for Distance Learning

== Library ==
Established in 1981 along with the institution by the then civilian administration of Alhaji Shehu Usman Aliyu Shagari, the library did not inherit any material (books or journals) to start with. It began providing services to the university community from its temporary building in April 1983. When the university was merged with the University of Maiduguri in 1984, the library became a college Library under the authority, supervision, and control of Ramat Library, University of Maiduguri. When the university was granted autonomy in 1988, the library became a full-fledged university library.

The library offers resources in both print and electronic formats, as well as access to online databases, open educational resources, and open access journal.

Branch Libraries

- Faculty of Agriculture (FA) Library
- Faculty of Engineering (FE) Library
- Faculty of Environmental Sciences (FES) Library
- Faculty of Management Sciences (FMS) Library
- Faculty of Medical Sciences (FMS) Library

== See also ==
- List of Tertiary Institutions in Adamawa State
- Education in Nigeria
- List of universities in Nigeria
