= Azman University, Kano =

Azman University
- Motto: Driven by innovation
- Type: Private university
- Established: 2023
- Founder: Alh Dr. Abdulmunaf Yunusa Sarina
- Accreditation: NUC
- Chairman: Alh Dr. Abdulmunaf Yunusa Sarina
- Chancellor: Prince Arthur Eze
- Vice-Chancellor: Prof. Fatima Batul Mukhtar
- Location: Kano, Kano State, Nigeria
- Campus: Urban
- Website: https://www.azmanuniversity.edu.ng/

Azman University Kano is a private university located in Kano, Nigeria. It was established in 2023 and offers various undergraduate and postgraduate programs in fields such as health sciences, social and management sciences, agriculture, engineering, aviation, arts, and humanities.

== History and Foundation ==
The founder of Azman University Kano is Alh. (Dr.) Abdulmunaf Yunusa Sarina, a Nigerian businessman and philanthropist. He created the university in 2023 with the aim of providing education and problem-solving skills to the young people of Nigeria. He also serves as the Pro-Chancellor of the university.

== Academic Offerings ==
Azman University Kano has a range of academic programs in different disciplines. The programs cover areas such as health sciences, social and management sciences, agriculture, engineering, aviation, arts, and humanities.

=== Faculty of Computing and Science ===
- B.Sc. Biotechnology
- B.Sc. Microbiology
- B.Sc. Computer Science
- B.Sc. Cybersecurity
- B.Sc. Data Science
- B.Sc. Information Technology
- B.Sc. Software Engineering

=== Faculty of Management and Social Sciences ===
- B.Sc. Accounting
- B.Sc. Economics
- B.Sc. Public administration
- B.Sc. Aviation management
- B.Sc. Entrepreneurship
- B.Sc. Aviation security
- B.Sc. International relations
- B.Sc. Business management
- B.Sc. Procurement management

=== Faculty of allied health sciences ===
- Health care administration & hospital management
- Environmental health sciences
- Health information management
- Public health

== Campus and Facilities ==
The university has facilities that support learning and teaching. The campus has infrastructure, libraries, laboratories, and recreational spaces for students and staff.

== Leadership ==
Alh. (Dr.) Abdulmunaf Yunusa Sarina is the founder and Pro-Chancellor of Azman University Kano. He oversees the direction and management of the university.
