= Federal University Dutse =

Federal University in Jigawa State, Nigeria

Coordinates: 12.473°N 7.487°E

Federal University, Dutse
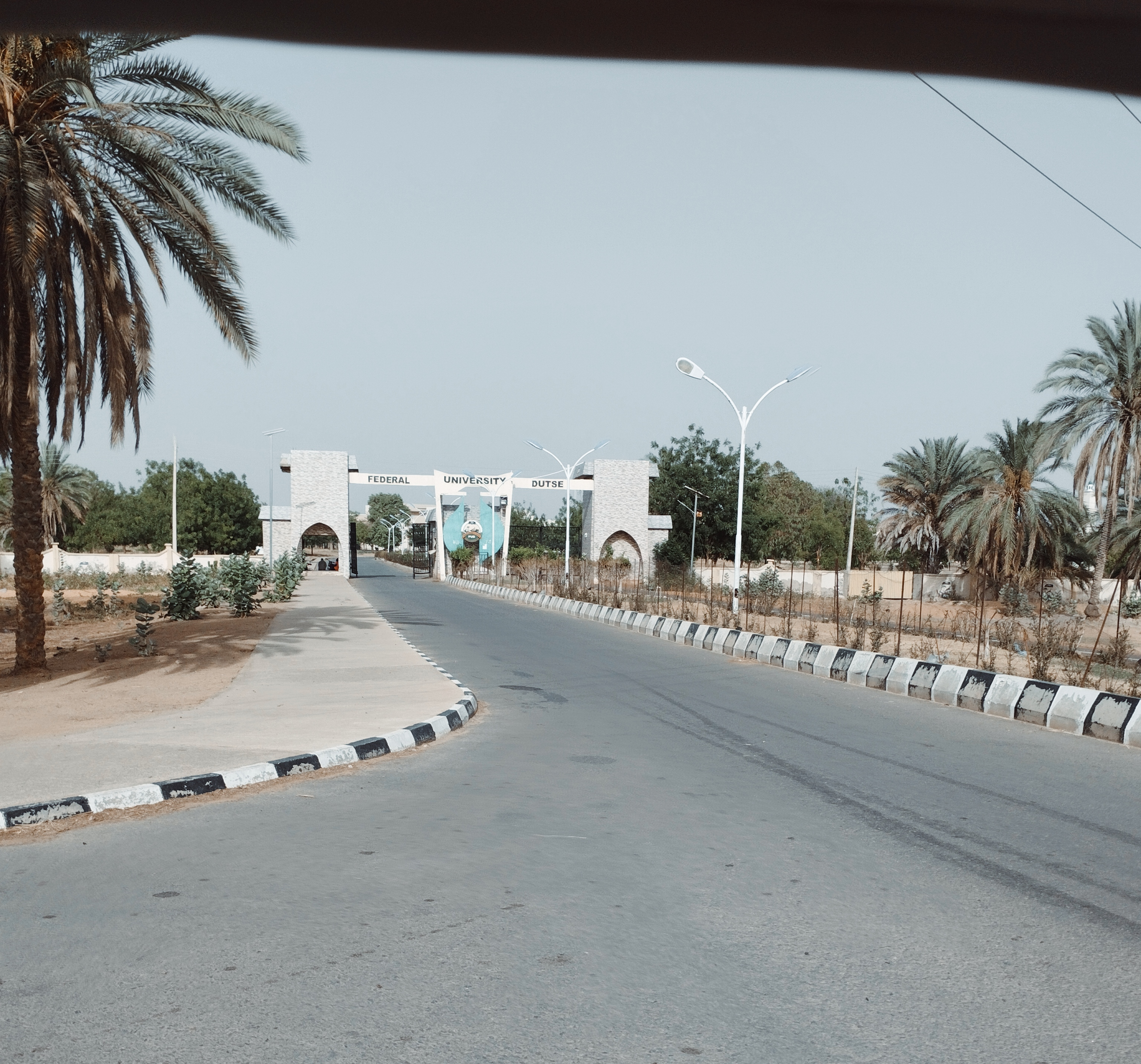
- Other name: FUD
- Motto: Knowledge, Excellence & Service
- Type: Public
- Established: 2011
- Vice-Chancellor: Prof. Ahmad Mohammad Gumel
- Location: Dutse, Jigawa State, Nigeria
- Campus: Urban
- Website: https://fud.edu.ng/

The Federal University Dutse (FUD), is one of the nine universities created by the Federal Government of Nigeria in 2011.

FUD offers both undergraduate and postgraduate programs (Pgde.Msc. as well as PhD.)

The Federal University, Dutse (FUD) held its first convocation ceremony on January 16, 2016.

Delivering his speech at the convocation ceremony the Pioneer Vice Chancellor of the University Professor Jibrilla Dahiru Aminu (OFR) revealed that the university has scored over 80 percent marks from the assessment made by National Council of University on Facilities and Academic Effectiveness. Delivering his speech at the convocation ceremony the Pioneer Vice Chancellor of the University, Professor Jibrilla Dahiru Aminu (OFR) revealed that the university has scored over 80 percent marks from the assessment made by National Council of University on facilities and academic effectiveness. The university's campus is located in the ancient town of Dutse, the capital of Jigawa State. FUD seeks to attract a diverse cast of lecturers and students, support research and teaching on local, national and global issues and create academic relationships with many universities and higher education institutions in Nigeria and across the world. FUD is offering a broad range of degree programs in Humanities, Natural and the Social Sciences, Agricultural Science and also in Medicine. Faculties in offerings are Faculty of law, faculty of engineering and faculty of management science to take up this year. From the university's pioneer crop of 205 students enrolled in four academic programmes in three faculties had grown to about 3,200 students in the university's fifth academic year of operation, while there are 1,332 academic and non-teaching staff. The number courses in the university now stand at 17.

== College of Medicine and Allied Medical Sciences ==
The College of Medicine and Allied Medical Sciences is the health-professional education arm of Federal University Dutse. The college is responsible for undergraduate medical education, clinical training, and biomedical research, including the Bachelor of Medicine, Bachelor of Surgery (MBBS) programme and allied health sciences.

The college trains medical students through a structured progression from basic medical sciences to full clinical practice and operates in affiliation with a federal teaching hospital for hands-on clinical instruction.

=== Organisation ===
The College of Medicine and Allied Medical Sciences is organised into three faculties:

- Faculty of Basic Medical Sciences
- Faculty of Basic Clinical Sciences
- Faculty of Clinical Sciences

The Faculty of Basic Medical Sciences provides foundational biomedical education, while the Faculties of Basic Clinical Sciences and Clinical Sciences are directly involved in the training of medical students and clinical practice.

=== Faculty of Basic Medical Sciences ===
The Faculty of Basic Medical Sciences provides foundational instruction in human structure, function, and public health. It supports the early phases of medical education and allied health programmes.

Departments in the faculty include:

- Department of Human Anatomy
- Department of Human Physiology
- Department of Medical Biochemistry
- Department of Nursing Sciences
- Department of Environmental Health
- Department of Public Health

The faculty emphasizes laboratory-based learning and prepares students for subsequent clinical training.

=== Faculty of Basic Clinical Sciences ===
The Faculty of Basic Clinical Sciences serves as a bridge between the basic medical sciences and full clinical practice. It introduces medical students to disease mechanisms, diagnostics, and therapeutic principles prior to clinical rotations.

Departments in the faculty include:

- Department of Chemical Pathology
- Department of Haematology
- Department of Histopathology
- Department of Medical Microbiology and Parasitology
- Department of Clinical Pharmacology and Therapeutics

=== Faculty of Clinical Sciences ===
The Faculty of Clinical Sciences delivers advanced clinical training and patient-centered education. Medical students undertake supervised clinical postings and rotations during the later stages of the MBBS programme.

Departments in the faculty include:

- Department of Community Medicine
- Department of Internal Medicine
- Department of Surgery
- Department of Obstetrics and Gynaecology
- Department of Paediatrics

=== Teaching Hospital ===
Clinical training for students of the College of Medicine and Allied Medical Sciences is conducted primarily at the Rasheed Shekoni Federal University Teaching Hospital, Dutse. The hospital was taken over by the Federal Government of Nigeria and designated as a teaching hospital to support the medical programmes of Federal University Dutse.

The teaching hospital provides clinical services across major medical and surgical specialties and serves as the main centre for bedside teaching, clinical rotations, and residency training.

=== Research and Community Service ===
The college engages in biomedical, clinical, and public health research and participates in community-based health programmes, rural clinical postings, and public health outreach initiatives as part of its medical training curriculum.

== University Library ==
The main Library is located at the central campus with seven divisions that is headed by a University Librarian. Each division has information resources that meet the information needs of the academic community. these sections are

- Collection Development division is concerned with acquisition of information resources i n the library.
- Technical services division is concerned with processing of information resource through classification, cataloguing, indexing and abstracting.
- Readers service Division is the public relation units that deal with staff and students registration and controlled the uses of library materials.
- Education and information division take care of General Studies course of library instructions.
- Serial Management division acquires scientific and other materials that are published time to time like newspapers, magazines, journals etc.

== List of academic programmes ==
=== College of Medicine and Allied Medical Sciences, Federal University Dutse ===
Federal University Dutse in its fifth academic calendar have succeeded in establishing College of Medicine and Allied Medical Sciences. The faculty runs the following programs:

- Bachelor of Medicine, Bachelor of Surgery
- Human Anatomy
- Human Physiology
- Nursing science
- Public Health
- Environmental Health Science
- Nursing sciences

=== Faculty of Agriculture ===
FUD currently run six academic programmes in the Faculty of Agriculture

- Department of Agricultural Economics & Extension
- Department of Animal Science
- Department of Crop Science
- Department of Fisheries and Aquaculture
- Department of Forestry and Wildlife
- Department of Soil Science

=== Faculty of Arts and Social Sciences ===
FUD currently run four academic programmes in the Faculty of Arts and Social Sciences

- Department of Economics
- Department of Linguistics English Language
- Department of Linguistics Arabic
- Department of Political Science
- Department of Criminology And Security Studies

=== Faculty of Management Sciences ===
FUD currently run five academic programmes in the Faculty of Management Sciences

- Department of Accounting
- Department of Actuarial Science
- Department of Banking and Finance
- Department of
- Department of insurance
- Department of Taxation

=== Faculty Of life Science ===
FUD currently run six academic programmes in the Faculty of life Sciences including :

- Department of Physics
- Department of Chemistry
- Department of Environmental Management & Toxicology
- Department of Mathematics
- Department of Biological Sciences
- Department of Biochemistry
- Department of Microbiology & Biotechnology

=== Faculty of physical science ===
- Department of chemistry
- Department of Physics
- Department of mathematics
- Department of environmental management and taxicology
- Department of industrial chemistry
- Department of industrial mathematics

=== Faculty of Computing ===
- Department of Software Engineering
- Department of Computer Science
- Department of Cyber Security
- Department of Information Technology

=== Faculty of Education ===
- Department of Library and information science
- Department of primary education
- Department of Islamic studies

=== School of Postgraduate Studies Federal University Dutse ===
The school of postgraduate was established in 2014/2015 and it runs 10 post graduate Studies. In addition to Msc, Federal University Dutse now offers PhD degree on Biotechnology and Microbiology. Federal University Dutse focuses on building relations with other universities locally and internationally. The university has entered an agreement with North Dakota State University.

== Federal University Dutse News ==
- FUD ranks No.1 University in Northwest -NUC
- SCImago ranks FUD No.1 in Mathematics in Africa

== Gallery ==
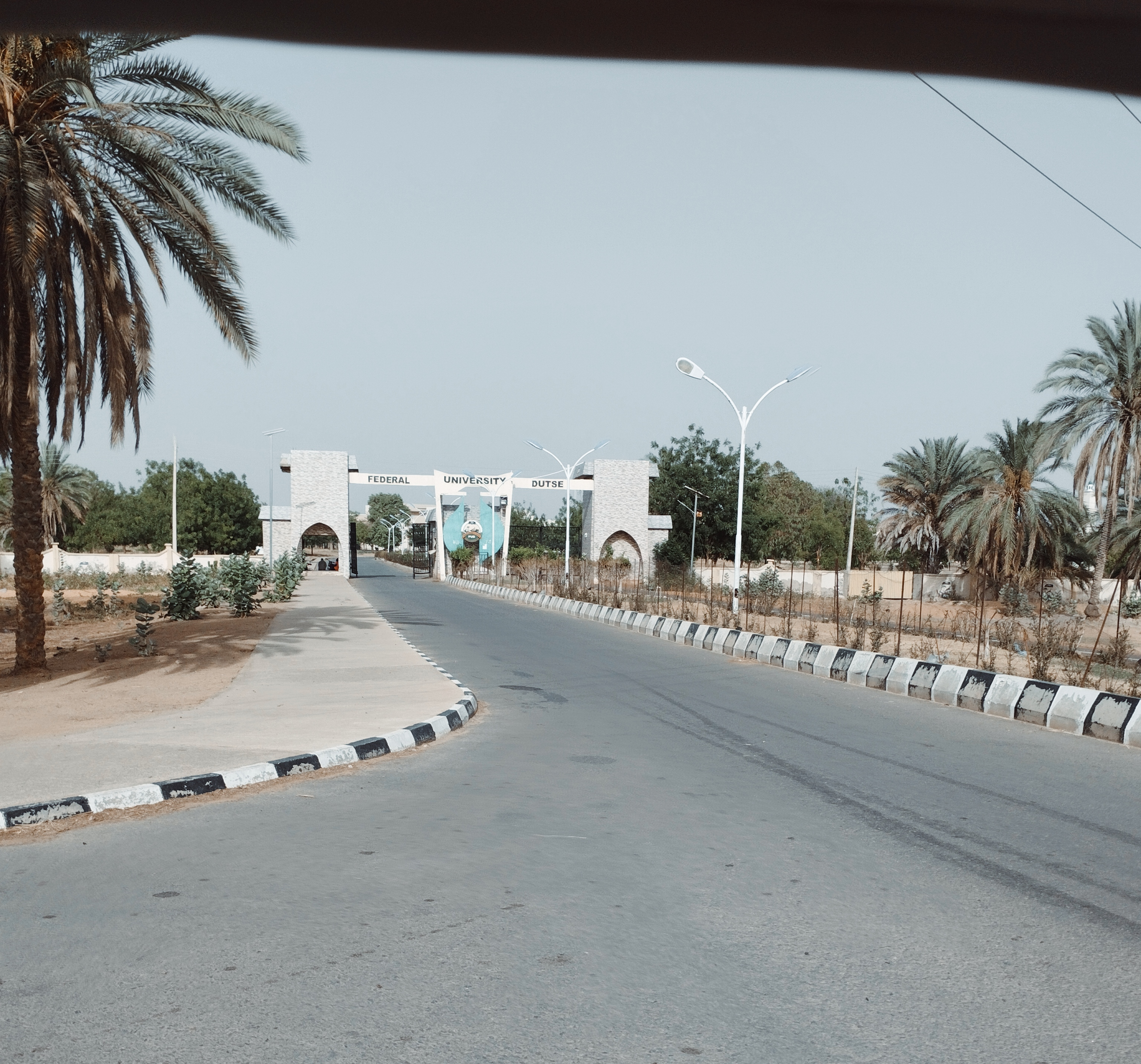

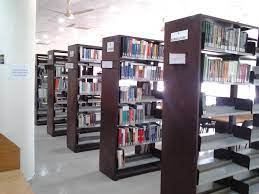

== See also ==
- List of universities in Nigeria
- Education in Nigeria
