= Kano University of Science and Technology =

University in Wudil, Nigeria

Aliko Dangote University of Science and Technology, Wudil (formerly Kano University of Science and Technology, Wudil (KUST Wudil))
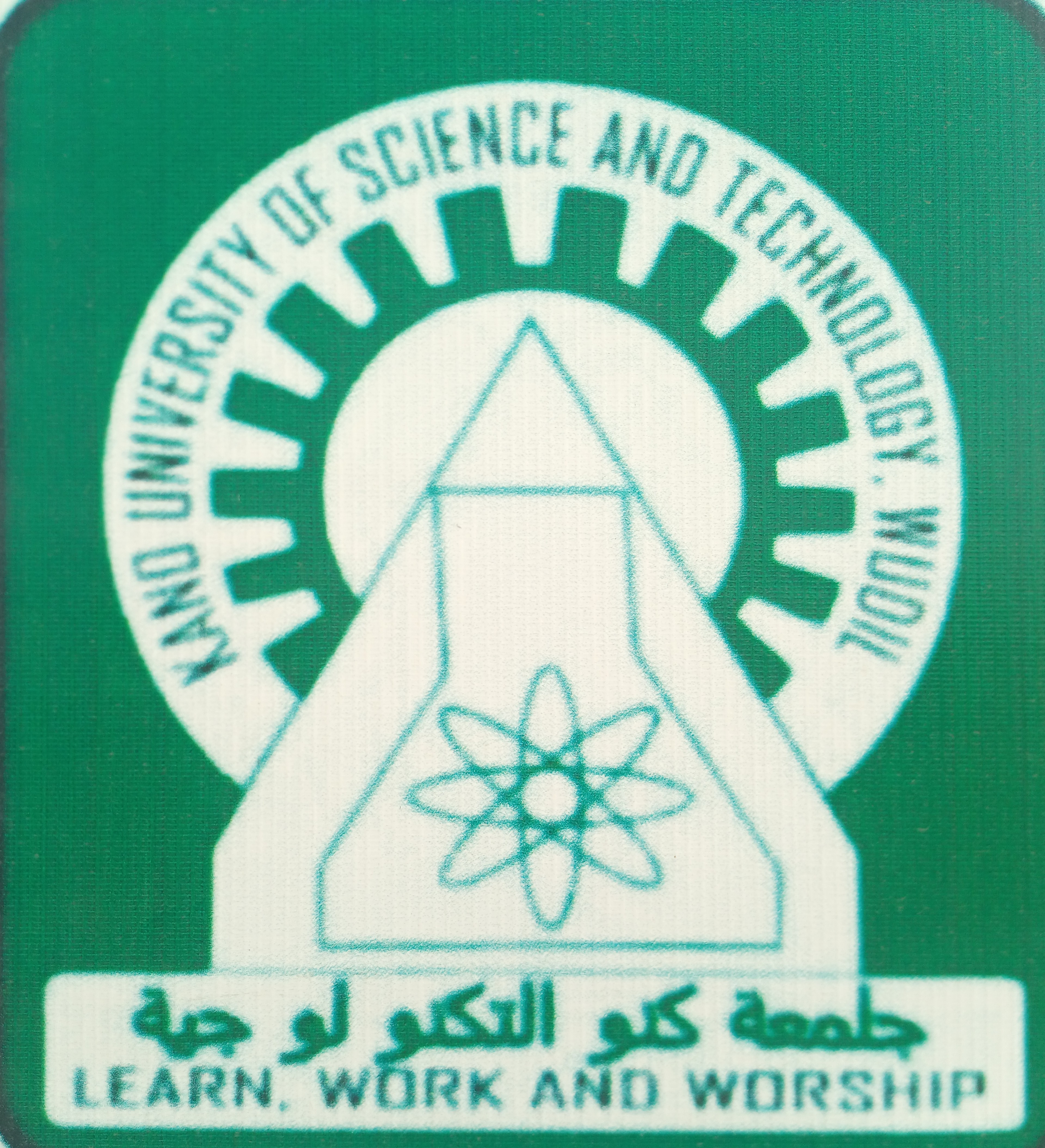
- Motto: Learn, Work and Worship
- Type: State-Owned University;
- Established: 2001
- Chancellor: Aliko Dangote
- Vice-Chancellor: Prof Musa Tukur Yakasai
- Location: Wudil, Kano State, Nigeria; 11°47′N 8°50′E
- Website: www.kustwudil.edu.ng

The Aliko Dangote University of Science and Technology (formerly Kano University of Science and Technology) is a Kano State government-owned university. The university is located in Wudil. The university commenced academic activities in the year 2001 and is a member of the Association of Commonwealth Universities.

== Historical background ==
The university was formerly known as Kano University of Science and Technology (KUST), Wudil. The university is ranked 123rd in the list of Best Universities in Nigeria. The then governor of Kano state, Engr. Rabiu Musa Kwankwaso proposed establishing the university during his first tenure. The university was renamed to Aliko Dangote University of Science and Technology, Wudil, in 2022 by Governor Abdullahi Umar Ganduje.

== University Library ==
The University Library was established in 2001 with the objectives of supporting teaching, learning and research activities of the university through systematic acquisition and organization of modern information resource in all field of study patent to the goal of the university.

The library has the following units:

- Circulation Unit
- Reference unit
- Serial Unit
- E - Library section

== University Faculties ==
The university started with two faculties, the Faculty of Agriculture and Agriculture Technology and the Faculty of Science. It has now grown into six faculties which includes The Faculty of Agriculture and Agriculture Technology(FAAT), Faculty of Computing and Mathematical Science(FACMS), Faculty of Earth and Environmental Science(FAEES), Faculty Of Engineering (FAENG), Faculty Of Science (FASCI) Faculty of Science and Technical Education (FASTE).

== Courses and program ==
- Agricultural economics and extension
- Agricultural engineering
- Agricultural education
- Animal science
- Architecture
- Automotive engineering
- Biochemistry
- Biology
- Chemistry
- Civil engineering
- Computer science
- Crop science
- Education and biology
- Education and chemistry
- Education and geography
- Education and mathematics
- Education and physics
- Electrical engineering
- Forestry, fisheries and wildlife
- Food science and technology
- Geography
- Geology
- Human Kinetics
- Health education
- Information and communication technology
- Library and information science
- Mathematics
- Mechanical engineering
- Mechatronics engineering
- Metrology
- Microbiology
- Physics
- Science laboratory technology
- Statistics
- Soil science
- Urban and regional planning
- Water resources and environment engineering
