= List of vice-chancellors of Nigerian universities =

This is a list of the current and active vice-chancellors of universities in Nigeria.

== Federal University ==
- Mustapha Sheikh Abdullahi (2026) is the first Vice Chancellor of African Aviation and Aerospace University
- Aisha Maikudi (2025) is the Vice Chancellor of University of Abuja
- Ibrahim Umar (MAUTECH 9th VC) (2024) is the Vice Chancellor of Modibbo Adama Federal University of Technology, Yola.
- Ango Abdullahi (1979) is the 5th Vice Chancellor of Ahmadu Bello University Zaria
- Muhammad Abdulazeez (ATBU 2019 VC) (2019) is the Vice Chancellor of Abubakar Tafawa Balewa University.
- Umar Pate (2020) is the Vice Chancellor of Federal University Kashere.
- Akpofure Rim-Rukeh (2020) is the Vice Chancellor of Federal University of Petroleum Resources, Effurun.
- Kabiru Bala (2020) is the Vice Chancellor of Ahmadu Bello University.
- Haruna Dantoro Dlakwa (2024) is the Acting Vice Chancellor of Bayero University, Kano
- Teddy Charles Adias (2020) is the Vice Chancellor of Federal University, Otuoke.
- Abayomi Fasina (2021) is the Vice Chancellor of Federal University Oye Ekiti.
- Abdulkarim Sabo Muhammad (2021) is the Vice Chancellor of Federal University Dutse.
- Muazu Abubakar Gusau (2021) is the Vice Chancellor of Federal University, Gusau.
- Maduebibisi Iwe (2021) is the Vice Chancellor of Michael Okpara University of Agriculture.
- Olufemi Peters (2021) is the Vice Chancellor of National Open University of Nigeria.
- Jude Sammani Rabo (2021) is the Vice Chancellor of Federal University, Wukari.
- Nnenna Oti (2021) is the Vice Chancellor of Federal University of Technology, Owerri.
- Olayemi Akinwunmi (2021) is the Vice Chancellor of Federal University, Lokoja.
- Sunday Oge Elom (2021) is the Vice Chancellor of Alex Ekwueme Federal University Ndufu Alike Ikwo.
- Armaya'u Hamisu (2021) is the Vice Chancellor of Federal University, Dutsin-Ma.
- Maimuna Waziri (2021) is the Vice Chancellor of Federal University Gashua.
- Adenike Oladiji (2022) is the Vice Chancellor of Federal University of Technology, Akure
- Faruk Adamu Kuta (2022) is the Vice Chancellor of Federal University of Technology, Minna.
- Mohammed Isa Kida (2026) is the Vice-Chancellor of Federal University of Lafia.
- Muhammad Zaiyan-Umar (2022) is the Vice Chancellor of Federal University, Birnin Kebbi.
- Mohammed Laminu Mele (2024) is the Vice Chancellor of University of Maiduguri
- Folasade Ogunsola (2022) is the 13th Vice Chancellor of the University of Lagos
- William Barnabas Qurix (2025) is the pioneer Vice Chancellor of the Federal University of Applied Sciences Kachia.
- Peter Olapegba (2026) is the 14th Vice Chancellor of the University of Ibadan

== State University ==
- O. M. Ogbulu (2020) is the Vice Chancellor N.of Abia State University.
- Kaletapwa Farauta (2020) is the Vice Chancellor of Adamawa State University.
- Olugbenga Ige (2020) is the Vice Chancellor of Adekunle Ajasin University.
- Nse Essien (2020) is the Vice Chancellor of Akwa Ibom State University.
- Samuel Olowo (2020) is the Vice Chancellor of Ambrose Alli University.
- Kate Omenugha (2020) is the Vice Chancellor of Chukwuemeka Odumegwu Ojukwu University.
- Auwalu Uba Adamu (2020) is the Vice Chancellor of Bauchi State University, Gadau.
- Joe Tor Iorapuu (2020) is the Vice Chancellor of Benue State University.
- Mala Mohammed Daura (2020) is the Vice Chancellor of Yobe State University.
- Augustine Oko Angba (2020) is the Vice Chancellor of Cross River State University of Technology, Calabar.
- Andy Egwunyenga (2020) is the Vice Chancellor of Delta State University.
- Chigozie Ogbu (2020) is the Vice Chancellor of Ebonyi State University.
- Edward Olanipekun (2020) is the Vice Chancellor of Ekiti State University.
- Aloysius-Michaels Nnabugwu Okolie (2020) is the Vice Chancellor of Enugu State University of Science and Technology.
- Aliyu Usman El-Nafaty (2020) is the Vice Chancellor of Gombe State University.
- Abu Kasim Adamu (2020) is the Vice Chancellor of Ibrahim Badamasi Babangida University.
- Okechukwu Onuchukwu (2020) is the Vice Chancellor of Ignatius Ajuru University of Education.
- U Chukwumaeze (2020) is the Vice Chancellor of Imo State University, Owerri.
- Lawan Sani Taura (2020) is the Vice Chancellor of Sule Lamido University, Kafin Hausa, Jigawa.
- Abdullahi Ibrahim Musa (2022) is the Vice Chancellor of Kaduna State University.
- Musa Tukur Yakasai (2023) is the Vice Chancellor of Kano University of Science and Technology.
- Bashir Ladan Aliero (2020) is the Vice Chancellor of Kebbi State University of Science and Technology.
- Marietu Tenuche (2020) is the Vice Chancellor of Prince Abubakar Audu University.
- Luqman Jimoh (2020) is the Vice Chancellor of Kwara State University.
- Razaq Olatunde Rom Kalilu (2023) is the Vice Chancellor of Ladoke Akintola University of Technology.
- Temi E. Ologunorisa (2020) is the Vice Chancellor of Ondo State University of Science and Technology.
- Nlerum Sunday Okogbule (2020) is the Vice Chancellor of Rivers State University.
- Ayodeji Agboola (2020) is the Vice Chancellor of Olabisi Onabanjo University.
- Ibiyemi Olatunji-Bello (2020) is the Vice Chancellor of Lagos State University.
- Samuel Gowon Edoumiekumo (2020) is the Vice Chancellor of Niger Delta University.
- Bala Mohammed (2020) is the Vice Chancellor of Nasarawa State University, Keffi.
- Yohana D. Izam (2020) is the Vice Chancellor of Plateau State University.
- Oluwole Banjo (2020) is the Vice Chancellor of Tai Solarin University of Education, Ijebu Ode.
- Sunusi Mamman (2020) is the Vice Chancellor of Umar Musa Yar' Adua University , Katsina.
- Odunayo Clement Adeboye (2020) is the Vice Chancellor of Osun State University.
- Sunday Paul Bako (2020) is the Vice Chancellor of Taraba State University.
- Bashir Garba (2020) is the Vice Chancellor of Sokoto State University.
- Mukhtar Atiku Kurawa (2020) is the Vice Chancellor of Yusuf Maitama Sule University.
- Adesola Ajayi (2020) is the Vice Chancellor of First Technical University, Ibadan.
- Adesegun Fatusi (2020) is the Vice Chancellor of Ondo State University of Medical Sciences.
- Emmanuel Aluyor (2020) is the Vice Chancellor of Edo State University.
- Ikechukwu Dozie (2020) is the Vice Chancellor of Kingsley Ozumba Mbadiwe University.
- Kingston Nyamapfene (2020) is the Vice Chancellor of University of Africa, Toru Orua.
- Umar Kyari Sandabe (2020) is the Vice Chancellor of Bornu State University.
- Akinwale Coker (2020) is the Vice Chancellor of Moshood Abiola University of Science and Technology
- Yahaya Zakar Abdullahi (2020) is the Vice Chancellor of Zamfara State University.
- Ebitimitula Nicholas Etebu (2020) is the Vice Chancellor of Bayelsa Medical University.
- Patrick E. Egbule (2020) is the Vice Chancellor of University of Agriculture and Environmental Sciences.
- Salawu Sadiku (2020) is the Vice Chancellor of Confluence University of Science and Technology.
- Stells C. Chiemeke (2020) is the Vice Chancellor of University of Delta Agbor.

== Private University ==
- Samuel Aje (2020) is the Vice Chancellor of Achievers University, Owo
- Samuel Ekundayo Alao (2020) is the Vice Chancellor of Adeleke University, Ede
- Smaranda Olarinde (2020) is the Vice Chancellor of Afe Babalola University, Ado-Ekiti
- Azikiwe Peter Onwualu (2020) is the Vice Chancellor of African University of Science and Technology Abuja
- Timothy Adebayo (2020) is the Vice Chancellor of Ajayi Crowther University, Ibadan
- Noah Yusuf (2020) is the Vice Chancellor of Al-Hikmah University, Ilorin
- Nasiru Musa Yauri (2020) is the Vice Chancellor of Al-Qalam University, Katsina
- Margee Ensign (2020) is the Vice Chancellor of American University of Nigeria, Yola
- Steve Afolami (2020) is the Vice Chancellor of Augustine University
- Ademola S. Tayo (2020) is the Vice Chancellor of Babcock University, Ilishan-Remo
- Michael Hodd (2020) is the Vice Chancellor of Baze University
- Jeremiah Ojediran (2020) is the Vice Chancellor of Bells University of Technology,
- Sam Guobadia (2020) is the Vice Chancellor of Benson Idahosa University, Benin City,
- William Barnabas Qurix (2020) is the Vice Chancellor of Bingham University, New Karu
- Joshua Olalekan Ogunwole (2020) is the Vice Chancellor of Bowen University, Iwo
- Nosa Owens-Ibie (2020) is the Vice Chancellor of Caleb University, Lagos
- Vincent C. Okore (2020) is the Vice Chancellor of Caritas University, Enugu
- Chinedum Peace Babalola (2020) is the Vice Chancellor of Chrisland University
- Timothy A. Anake (2024) is the Vice Chancellor of Covenant University, Ota
- Isaac Rotimi Ajayi (2020) is the Vice Chancellor of Crawford University, Igbesa,
- Jacinta A. Opara (2024) is the Vice Chancellor of Dominican University, Ibadan.
- Abdullahi Adamu (2023) is the vice Chancellor of Phoenix University, Agwada
- Austin Nosike (2025) is the Vice Chancellor of James Hope University, Lagos, Lagos

== See also ==
- List of Nigerians
- List of universities in Nigeria
- Lists of university leaders
