= Abayomi Fasina =

Nigerian professor of soil science

Abayomi Sunday Fasina

3rd Vice-Chancellor of Federal University Oye Ekiti
- In office 11 February, 2021 – 10 February, 2026
- Preceded by: Professor Kayode Soremekun
- Succeeded by: Professor Joshua Olalekan Ogunwole

Personal details
- Profession: Academic; Educator; Administrator

Abayomi Sunday Fasina is a Nigerian professor of soil science who is the Vice Chancellor of the Federal University Oye Ekiti, Ekiti state, Nigeria since 2021.

== Appointment ==
Abayomi Fasina was the deputy vice Chancellor (Administration) until his appointment as the Vice-Chancellor. His appointment became a subject of controversy when a suit marked, FHC/ABJ/CS/250/2021, challenging the process was instituted in a Federal High Court sitting in the Federal Capital Territory, Abuja, by a non-governmental Organization called Tableland Society For the Oppressed (TSFO). The court in its ruling on 17 February 2022, held that the claimant (TSFO) did not have the legal right (locus standi) to institute the suit, while the trial judge (Justice Inyang Edem Ekwo) also ruled that the court lacked jurisdiction to entertain the matter, and consequently struck out the suit.
