= Mohammad Abdulazeez =

Mohammad Abdulazeez may refer to:

- Muhammad Abdulazeez (academic) the Vice-Chancellor of Abubakar Tafawa Balewa University between 2019 and 2024
- Mohammad Youssuf Abdulazeez A resident of Hixson, Tennessee, was identified as the gunman involved in 2015 Chattanooga shootings
