= Auwal =

Auwal may refer to:

== Place ==
- Auwal Mosque, oldest mosque in South Africa

== People ==
=== First name ===
- Auwal H Yadudu (born 1953), Nigerian academic
- Auwal Jatau, Nigerian politician
- Auwal Musa Rafsanjani, Nigerian activist

=== Middle name ===
- Muhammad Auwal Albani Zaria (1960-2014), Nigerian Islamic scholar
