= Muhammad Zaiyan-Umar =

Nigerian Academics

3rd Vice-Chancellor of Federal University, Birnin Kebbi
- Incumbent
- Assumed office 24 November 2022
- Preceded by: Bello Shehu

Personal details
- Born: Muhammad Zaiyan-Umar
- Profession: academic

Muhammad zaiyan-Umar is a Nigerian professor of Political Science at Usman Danfodio University sokoto state and the Vice-Chancellor of Federal University of Birnin Kebbi taking over from Bello Bala Shehu after 5 years in office. He was the former Deputy Vice Chancellor of Sokoto State University before he was appointed as the Vice-Chancellor of the University of Birnin Kebbi by the governing council of the school in 2022.
