= Tenebe =

Tenebe is a Nigerian surname that may refer to the following notable people:

- Jarret Tenebe (born 1956), Nigerian politician and sports administrator
- Vincent Ado Tenebe (born 1958), Nigerian agronomist
