= 2023 Nigeria floods =

Natural disaster in Nigeria

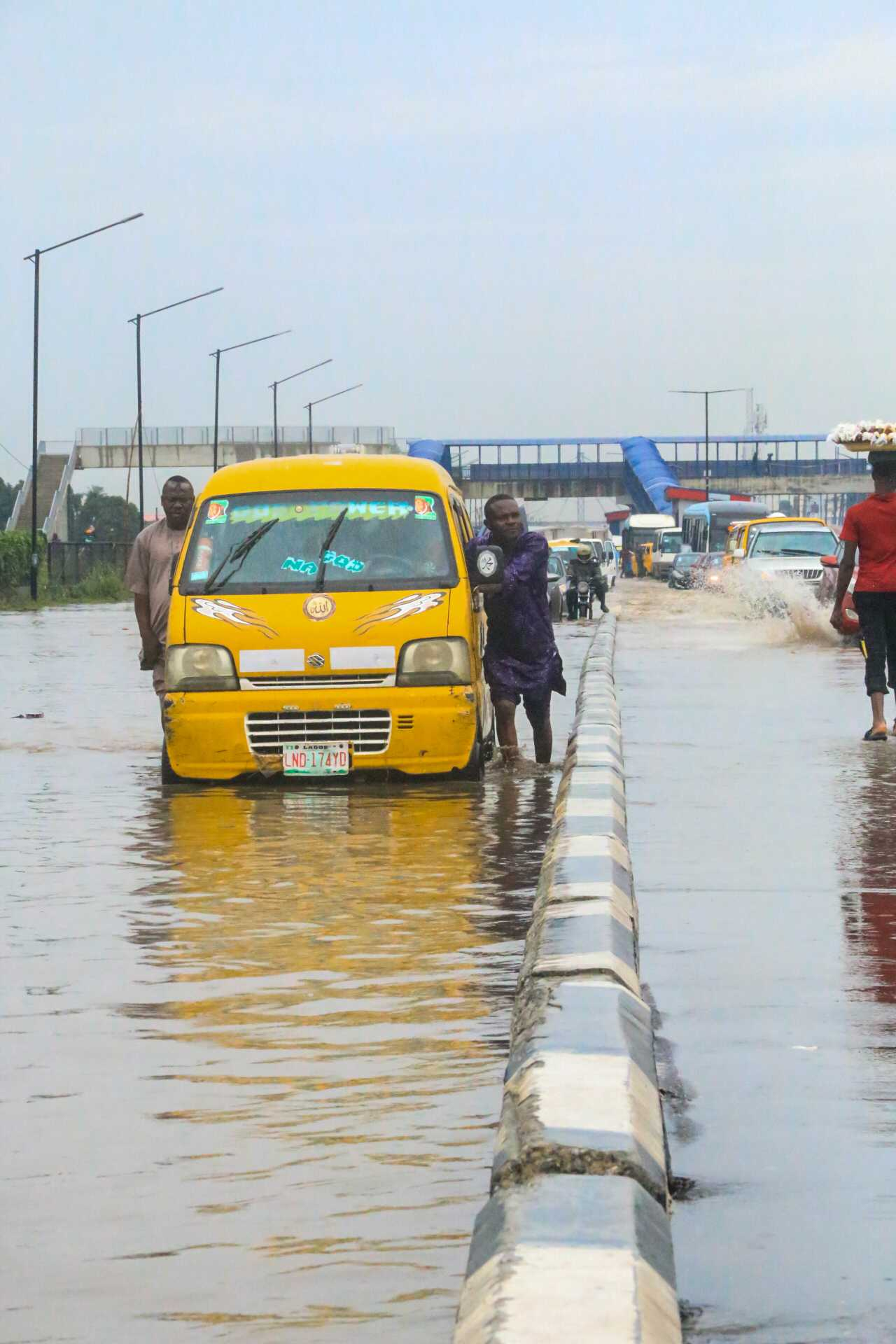
- Date: 2023
- Location: Kano, Maiduguri, Lagos, Ondo State, Adamawa State
- Cause: Heavy Rainfall
- Property damage: House, Road

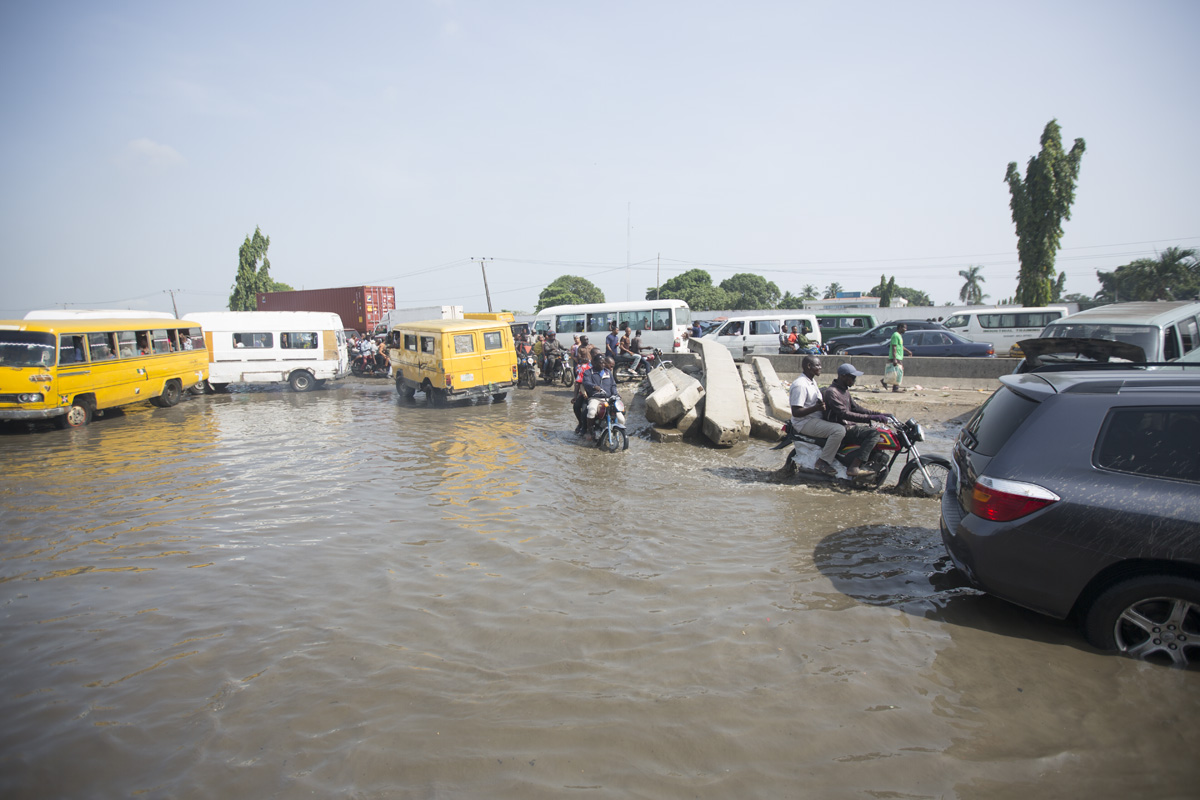
A feeder road in Mazamaza, flooded during the flood events

Starting in March 2023, Nigeria experienced a series of flooding events that led to nationwide disruptions, but with concentrated economic effects in southern Nigeria. The increased flood season was first predicted by a seasonal report in January 2023 by the Nigerian Meteorological Agency (NiMet) predicted an early start of rains. Following the unusual flooding season, the National Emergency Management Agency said in October that more than 33,000 people nationwide were impacted by the flood disaster.

According to information released by the National Emergency Management Agency, or NEMA, 33,983 people nationwide were already impacted by the 2023 flood. A December 2023 report by the National Bureau of Statistics found that the season cost $9 billion USD in economic damage.

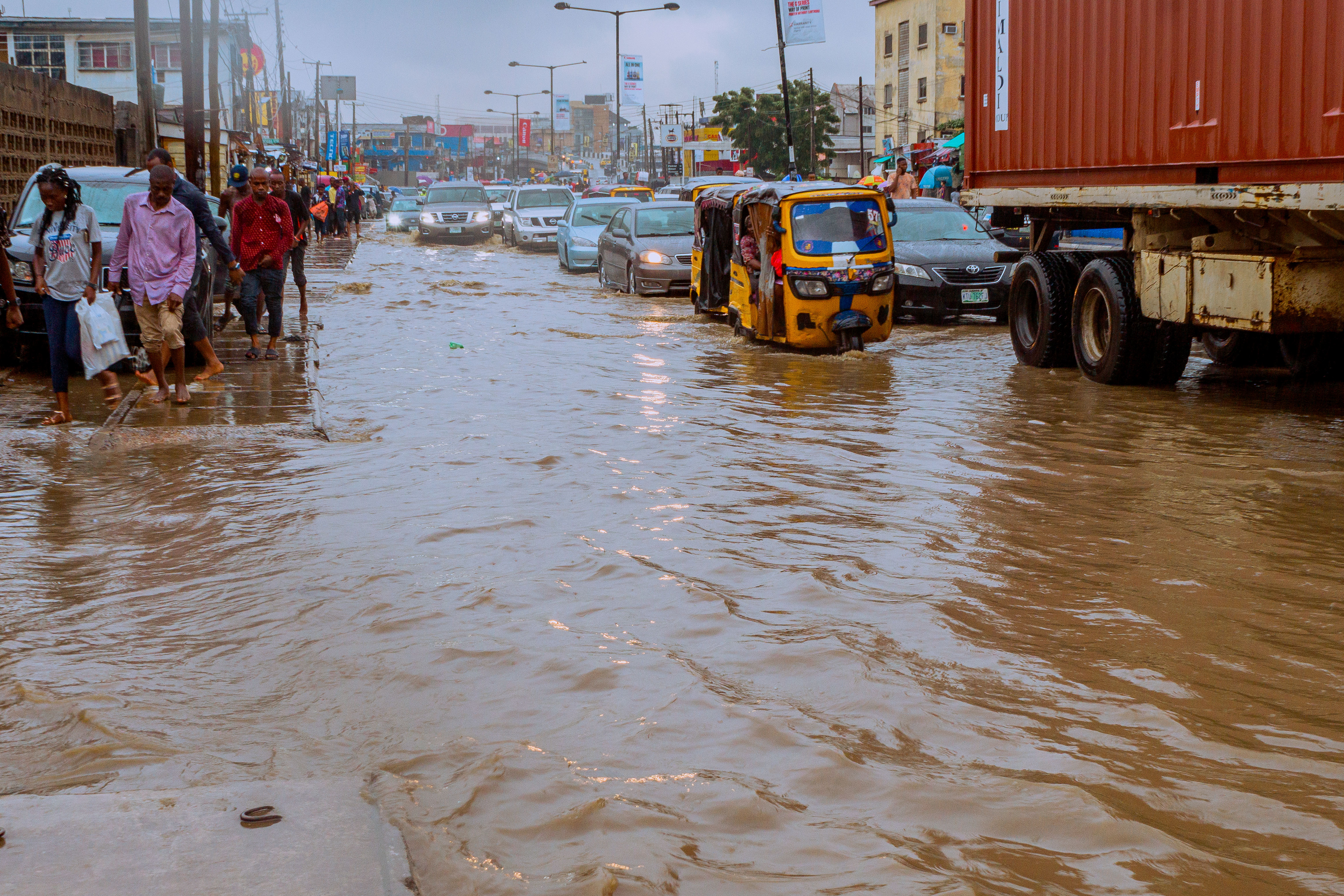
Flood in Nigeria

== Causes ==
The 2023 Nigeria floods was caused by climate change and heavy rainfall. Most often, climate changes causes flooding in Nigeria, it causes a lot of damages to properties and kills a lot of people. In the Oba-Ile neighborhood of Akure, the capital of Ondo State, numerous places were flooded earlier in 2023, and a resident was carried away by a flood on her way back from work.

== Flooding by location ==
=== Ondo state ===
In the Oba-Ile neighborhood of Akure, the capital of Ondo State, numerous places were flooded earlier this year 2023, and a resident was carried away by a flood on her way back from work.

=== Kwara ===
The heavy downpour which leads to flood that wash away the bridges in Odo-Ase community in Oke Ero Local Government Area kwara state.

=== Adamawa ===
Five individuals from various communities in Adamawa perished in September due to flooding. In Adamawa's Fufore, Yola South, and Mubi South LGAs, a number of homes and infrastructure were inundated.Akingbade stated that the emergency operation center had been activated to facilitate the coordination of operations and that the agency had started a comprehensive evaluation of the flood situation in Adamawa."Many people and communities have been impacted by the flooding in Adamawa," he stated.

=== Zamfara ===
Many house were destroyed by flood in the capital city of zamfara gusau, many roads and properties was also havoc by the heavy downpour in the state.

=== Lagos ===
The part of Agege, Ikorodu, Lagos Island, Ikeja are also affected with the flood and many properties were distroyed.

=== Other states ===
Other affected states included Kano State, Kaduna State, Gombe State, and Taraba State.
