= Yahaya Zakari Abdullahi =

Nigerian academic

Yahaya Abdullahi Zakari
- Born: Gusau
- Citizenship: Nigeria
- Occupation: Academic

Academic background
- Education: Usmanu Danfodiyo University; Shiga University

Academic work
- Discipline: Economics
- Institutions: Federal University Gusau; Zamfara State University

Yahaya Abdullahi Zakari is a Nigerian professor of economics and the current Vice Chancellor the Zamfara State University. He is a former Deputy Vice Chancellor of Federal University Gusau and has membership with the Nigerian Economic Society (NES) and Japan Society for International Development.

== Early life education ==
Yahaya Zakari was born in the year 1970 in Gusau the capital of Zamfara state. Zakari started his early education at Nizamiyya primary school Gusau between 1975-1981. He obtained his secondary education from CASS sokoto between 1981-1986. Zakari obtained his Bachelor, Masters and Maters of Business Administration from Usmanu Danfodiyo University Sokoto in 1993, 1999 and 2002 respectively. In 2007, he obtained his doctorate from Shiga University, Japan in Economics.

== Career ==
Zakari started his academic career in 1995 as an assistant lecturer at the Department of Business Studies, Federal Polytechnic Kaura. In 1996, he became a graduate assistant at Usmanu Danfodiyo University Sokoto and in 2012 he became a professor of Economics. In 2015, Zakari joined Federal University of Gusau where he became the deputy vice chancellor and February 11, 2021 he was appointed as the Vice Chancellor of Zamfara State University.
