= Roberts Ogunduyile =

Nigerian educator and academic administrator

Prof. Sunday Roberts Ogunduyile
- Born: Ondo state
- Citizenship: Nigerian
- Education: Amadu Bello University Zaria
- Occupations: Educationist, lecturer

Sunday Roberts Ogunduyile is a Nigerian educator and an academic administrator. As a professor of Industrial Design, he has served as Dean of School of Environmental Technology at the Federal University of Technology, Akure (FUTA) and as Director of FUTA Business Development Company. He is currently Vice Chancellor of Ondo State University of Science and Technology.

== Early life and education ==
Roberts Ogunduyile is a native of Ondo State. He received his B.A (1980), M.A (1985), and PhD (1996) in industrial design from Ahmadu Bello University in Zaria. He also has a postgraduate qualification in education (1983).

== Career ==
In 2017, Ogunduyile was appointed as vice chancellor of Ondo State University of Science and Technology by Governor Olusegun Mimiko. In July 2017, he disclosed that technological advancement will be his priority as head of the institution.

Ogunduyile is affiliated with the following societies: the Nigerian Society of Education through Art (SNEA), Nigerian Association of Educational Media and Technology (NAEMT), Nigerian Association of Textile Technology, Fabrics and Garment Designers (NATT), Society of Nigerian Artists (SNA) Secretary, Association of African Industrial Designers (AAID), Arts Council of African Studies Association (ACASA)

== Publications ==
In 2008, Ogunduyile wrote a paper on Art and Design Practices in Nigeria: The Problem of Dropping Out, which revealed that the professional status of academic graduates of art and design courses were shaky and many of the individuals had deviated from their original field of interest. The paper also differentiated between the institution-trained and non trained artists, based on the terms of their understanding of the profession. In 2016, he wrote an article Online and Offline Shopping Motivation of Apparel Consumers in Ibadan Metropolis, Nigeria which compares both online shopping and Offline shopping related with Nigeria citizens especially those at Ibadan. He also wrote some other articles which includes Relationship between the Use of Language on Billboard Advertisements and Consumers’ Urge to Purchase Products in Lagos State, Nigeria, Culturally Inspired Design Education: A Nigerian Case Study and Crafts engagement in the economic survival of South-Western Nigerian rural women

== Awards ==
He won a cash award for best logo design for cocoa producing countries by Cocoa Producers Alliance (COPAL) in 2000.
