= Muazu Abubakar =

Nigerian Professor of Toxicology

Muazu Abubakar Gusau

3rd Vice Chancellor of Federal University, Gusau
- Incumbent
- Assumed office 2021

Personal details
- Citizenship: Nigeria
- Education: University of Surrey, United Kingdom
- Occupation: Academic

Muazu Abubakar Gusau is a professor of toxicology and the third vice chancellor of the Federal University of Gusau.

== Education ==
Muazu Abubakar Gusau bagged his doctorate degree from the University of Surrey in the United Kingdom.

== Career ==
Muazu Abubakar Gusau was a professor at the Usman Danfodiyo University when he contested for the Vice-Chancellorship position at the Federal University of Gusau. On 10 December 2020, he was announced by Hon. Yissa Ezekiel Benjamin as the third vice chancellor out of the 19 professors who contested for the position.
