= Ebitimitula Nicholas Etebu =

Nigerian Academic

Vice Chancellor
- In office 2018–2024
- Appointed by: Seriake Dickson
- Succeeded by: Dimie Ogoina

Commissioner of Health
- In office 2016–2018

Ebitimitula Nicholas Etebu is a Nigerian professor of pathology and former vice-chancellor of Bayelsa Medical University.

== Career ==
Etebu started his career as a lecturer in health sciences at the University of Port Harcourt. In 2018 and 2024, he was appointed as acting vice-chancellor and later he became the vice-chancellor of Bayelsa Medical University.

== Personal life ==
He married Ongoebi Maureen Etebu, a professor, industrial engineer, and vice-chancellor of Nigeria Maritime University.
