= African Aviation and Aerospace University =

Aviation University in Abuja, Nigeria

- (AAAU)
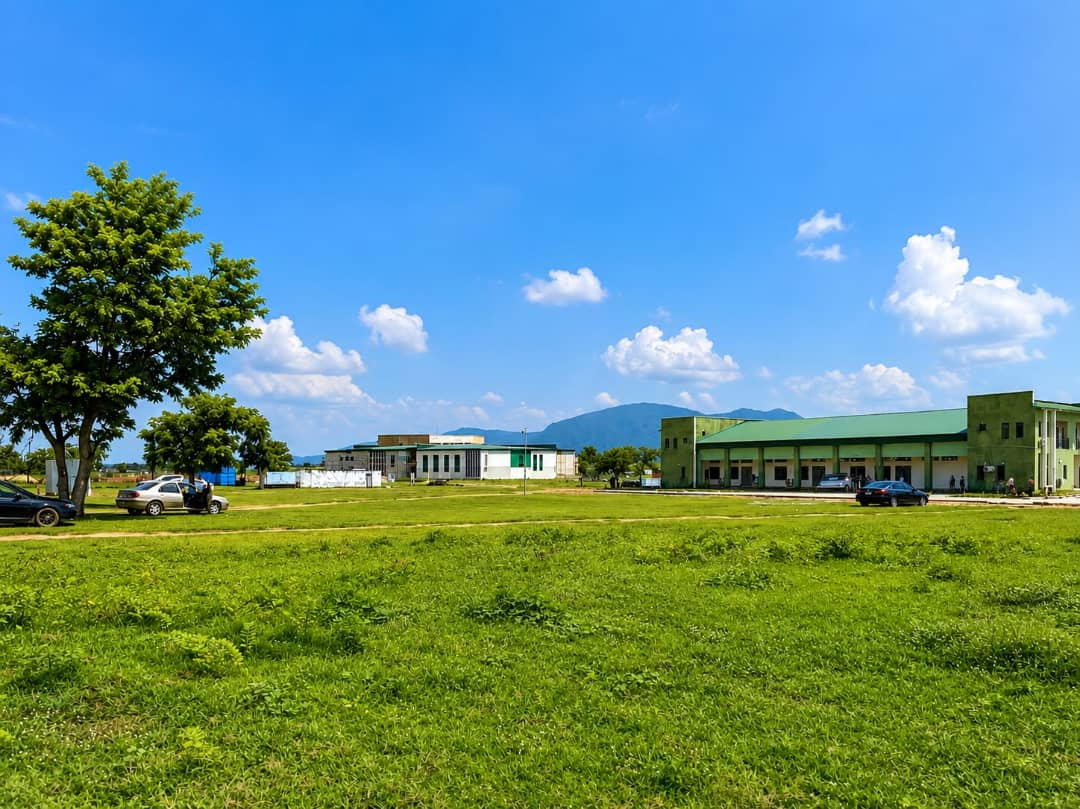
- Festus Keyamo Building
- Other names: AAAU, Abuja
- Type: Federal
- Established: 2022
- Parent institution: Federal Ministry of Aviation (Nigeria)
- Accreditation: National Universities Commission (NUC); International Civil Aviation Organization (ICAO); World Meteorological Organization (WMO)
- Academic staff: Mustapha Sheikh Abdullahi ,Vice Chancellor
- Undergraduates: 500+ Students
- Postgraduates: 150+ Students
- Location: Bill Clinton Drive, Airport Road, Abuja, Nigeria
- Language: English
- Colors: Green; White
- Website: www.aaau.edu.ng
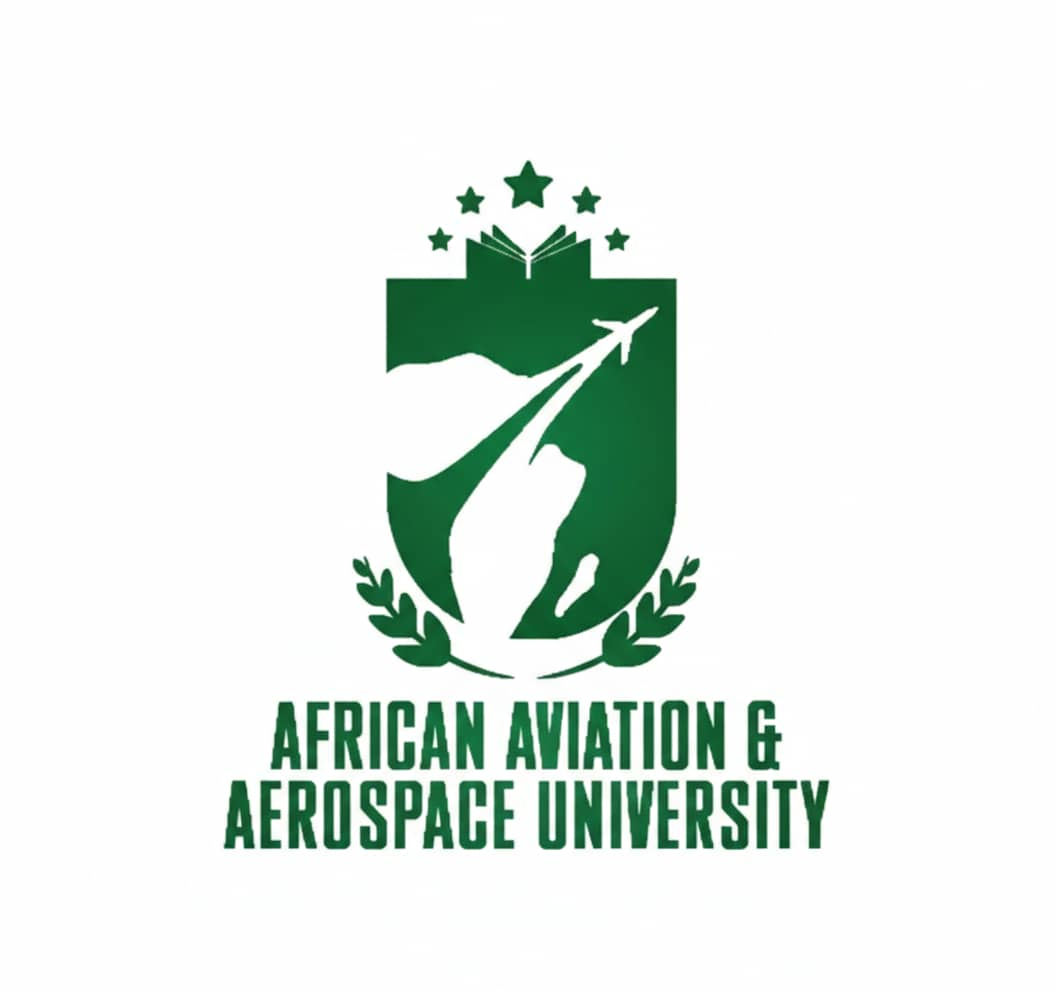

African Aviation and Aerospace University (AAAU) is a Federal University located in Abuja, Nigeria. It was founded by the Nigerian Government under the Federal Ministry of Aviation (Nigeria). AAAU offers Degree in Aeronautical Engineering, Aviation Business, and Meteorology.

== Overview ==
The African Aviation and Aerospace University (AAAU), Abuja, is a specialised Nigerian university focused on Aviation, Aerospace, Environmental Science, and related fields. The university was established in 2022 in response to the growing need for highly skilled professionals, advanced research, innovation, and university-level education within Africa’s aviation and aerospace industries.

== Faculties ==
- School Of Flying (Future Programmes)

 Flight Training 
 Standard Flight Operations 

- Faculty Of Engineering (Future Programmes)

 Aircraft Engineering
 Space Technology
 Electrical and Electronics 
 Mechanical Engineering
 Energy Engineering

- Faculty Of Aviation Management ( Available Programme)

 Aviation Business 

- Faculty Of Environmental Science and Climate Change (Available Programme)

  Meteorology and Climate Change

== Partners ==
- Embry Riddle Aeronautical University
- International Civil Aviation Organization
- Nigerian Safety Investigation Bureau
- Caliphate Aviation Centre
- École Nationale de l’Aviation Civile
- Gulf Aviation Academy
- University College of Aviation Malaysia
- Nigerian Institute of Transport Technology
- Nigerian College of Aviation Technology
- World Meteorological Organization
- Civil Aviation University of China
- Nigerian Space Research and Development Agency
- Atom Aviation Training Services
- Tertiary Educational Trust Fund
- Nigerian Meteorological Agency

== Awards ==
Recent Major Awards & Honors

- Most Promising Aviation Training Institution

15th NIGAV Awards (April 2026)

- Most Promising Aviation Career Development Institution

14th NIGAV Awards (2025)
