= Najeem Usman Yasin =

Nigerian trade unionists (born 1956)

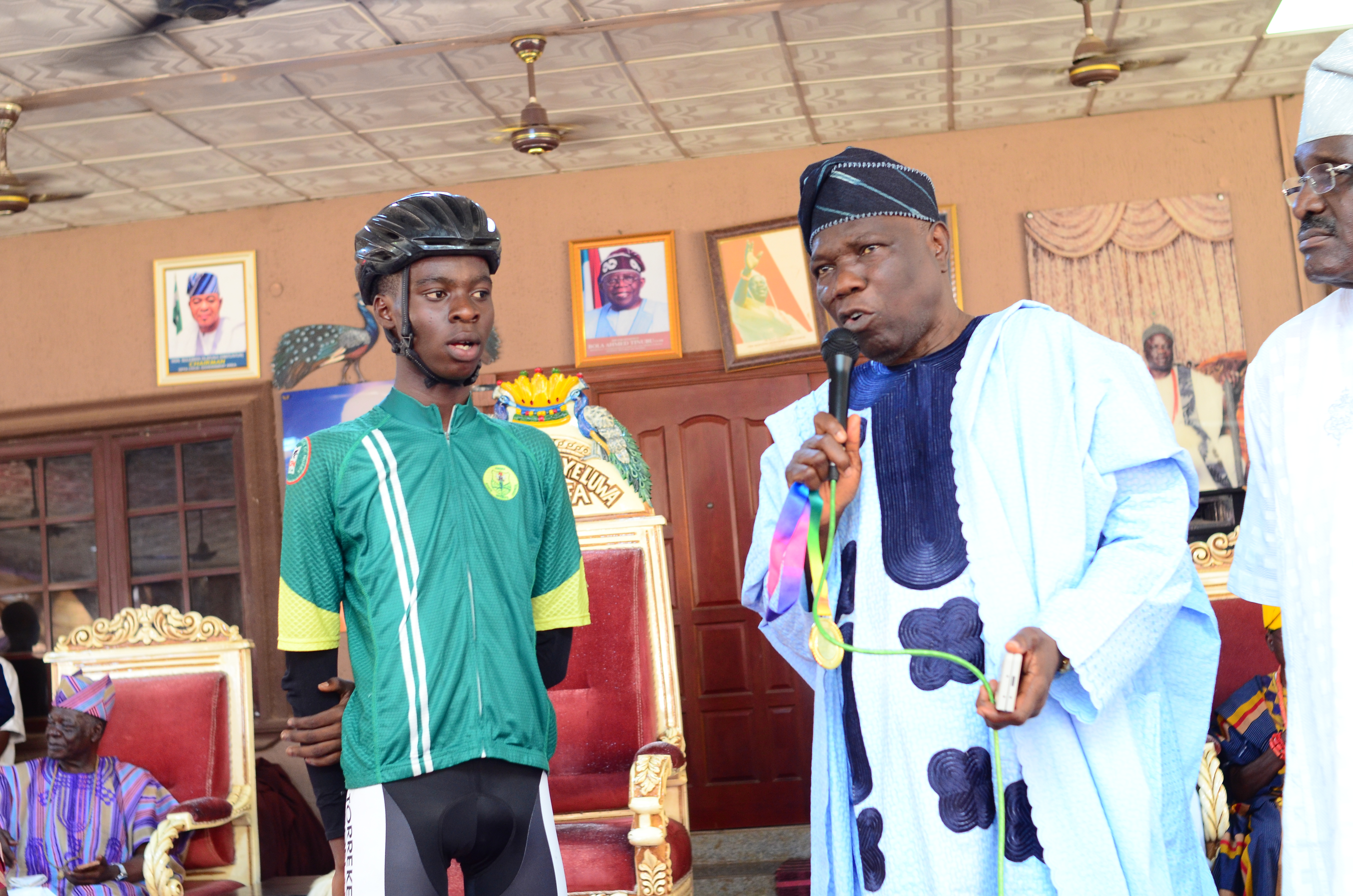
- Born: Najeem Usman Yasin; 15 April 1956 (age 70); Offa, Kwara State
- Citizenship: Nigeria
- Education: Taraba State University
- Occupation: Trade unionists
- Organization(s): National Union of Road Transport Workers, Nigeria Labour Congress,International Transport Workers’ Federation
- Notable work: Member of the Board of Trustees of the National Union of Road Transport Workers
- Title: Makama Gusau
- Board member of: National Union of Road Transport Workers
- Parents: Alhaji Usman Akanji Abiola Yasin (father); Alhaja Asande Usman Yasin (mother)

Alhaji Dr. Najeem Usman Yasin (born 15 April 1956) popularly known as Najeem Yasin is a Nigerian trade unionist and a member of the Board of Trustees of the National Union of Road Transport Workers. Prior to his appointment, he had previously served two terms as national president of National Union of Road Transport Workers and as Deputy President of the Nigeria Labour Congress.

== Early life and education ==
Najeem Yasin was born to the family of Alhaji Usman Akanji Abiola Yasin and her mother is Alhaja Asande Usman Yasin on 15 April 1956 in Zamfara, Nigeria. He originally hails from Offa. He was a former National president of Offa Descendants Union and the Makama of Gusau he was honoured with Doctorate degree at Taraba State University

== Career ==
Yasin is a Nigerian trade unionist and businessman. He was the Chief Executive Officer of Yasin Travel and Tour. He is currently serving as the Chairman of the Board of Trustees of the National Union of Road Transport Workers. He previously served two terms as President of the National Union of Road Transport Workers and as National Vice President of the Nigeria Labour Congress. He started his career in transport as a conductor in the old Sokoto State, now under Zamfara State, before becoming a driver and later joining the union executive as State Organizing Secretary and then as State Secretary prior to his emergence as the National President of the union.

=== International ===
Yasin has served as the Vice President of the International Transport Workers’ Federation (ITF) and Chairman of the ITF African Region
