= Bello Shehu =

Nigerian neurosurgeon (born 1958)

BB Shehu

2nd Vice-Chancellor of Federal University, Birnin Kebbi
- In office 2017–2022
- Preceded by: Prof LS Bilbis

Personal details
- Born: Bello Bala Shehu; 13 February 1958 (age 68)
- Education: Ahmadu Bello University
- Profession: Academician, Neurosurgeon

Bello Bala Shehu (born 13 February 1958) is a Nigerian academician and neurosurgeon. He was appointed as the vice chancellor of The Federal University Birnin-Kebbi (FUBK) in 2017 and previously served as the provost of the university's College of Health Sciences. Before his appointment as the VC, he was Chief Medical Director of the Usmanu Danfodiyo University Teaching Hospital, Sokoto, the Chief Medical Director of the National Hospital, Abuja and Medical Director, Federal Medical Centre, Birnin-Kebbi.

== Early life and education ==
Shehu was born on 13 February 1958, in Birnin-Kebbi, Nigeria. He is a graduate of Ahmadu Bello University in Zaria. He was trained as neurosurgeon at the Royal Victoria Hospital, Belfast in Northern Ireland, and Cork University Hospital in Cork, Ireland, as well as Oldchurch Hospital in Romford, England before returning to Nigeria as a trainer to young neurosurgeons.

== Membership ==
BB Shehu is a fellow of the West African College of Surgeons, Royal College of Surgeons, Ireland, American College of Surgeons, and National Postgraduate Medical College of Nigeria.
