= Jeremiah Ojediran =

Nigerian Academic

Jeremiah Oludele Ojediran
- Born: 13 January 1955 (age 71)
- Citizenship: Nigerian
- Occupation: Academician
- Spouse: Mrs. Ekiyor Ojediran

Academic background
- Education: University of Ibadan

Academic work
- Discipline: Agricultural engineer
- Institutions: Bells University of Technology,

Jeremiah Oludele Ojediran (born 13 January 1955) is a Nigerian academic and the fourth Vice-Chancellor of Bells University of Technology between 2016 and 2026. He is a member of the Council for the Regulation of Engineering in Nigeria (COREN) and a fellow the Nigerian Society of Engineers and the Nigerian Institution of Agricultural Engineers.

== Early life and education ==
Ojediran was from Ogbomoso, in Oyo State, Nigeria. He obtained his first degree in Engineering from the University of Ibadan and obtained his doctorate degree in agricultural engineering

== Academic career ==
Ojediran began his career at Federal Ministry of Land Resources in Kaduna but later moved to the then Polytechnic of Sokoto, Birnin-Kebbi in 1980 where he served as the acting head of department and dean. In 1990, based on the recommendation of professor Folagbade Aboaba, he joined Ladoke Akintola University of Technology (LAUTECH) at that time, it was called Oyo State University of Technology (OSUTECH) where he also served as Deputy Dean, Acting Dean and Deputy Vice-Chancellor from 2008 to 2010. In 2004, he was elevated to the rank of Professor of agricultural engineering and eventually became the acting Vice-Chancellor appointed by the Osun State government.

In 2016, he was appointed Vice-Chancellor of Bells University of Technology, Ota, Ogun State for a two tenure and he was eventually succeeded by Professor Abel Olajide Olorunnisola on 1 August 2026.

Ojediran is a member of the Council for the Regulation of Engineering in Nigeria (COREN), a fellow of the Nigerian Institution of Agricultural Engineers and the Nigerian Society of Engineers.

== Personal life ==
Ojediran is married to Mrs. Ekiyor Ojediran.
