= Adesola Ajayi =

Nigerian academic

Vice-Chancellor of First Technical University, Ibadan
- Incumbent
- Assumed office 9 May 2022
- Preceded by: Ayobami Salami

Personal details
- Born: Adesola Ajayi
- Education: Obafemi Awolowo University,Christian Albrecht University
- Profession: Academic

Adesola Ajayi is a professor of crop science and the second Vice-Chancellor of First Technical University in Nigeria. He was appointed by the senate council as the VC on the 9 May 2022 for a 5 years tenure.

== Career ==
Ajayi was the deputy vice-chancellor of First Technical University before his appointment as the Vice-Chancellor replacing the first VC of the school, Ayobami Salami whose tenure ended on the 8th of May, 2022. He was appointed as the Vice-Chancellor of First Technical University, Ibadan after the position was advertised on newspapers where 14 professors applied and 8 were shortlisted, after which he emerged as the winner following some exercises conducted by the senate selection board and joint council.
