= Auwal H Yadudu =

Nigerian academic (born 1953)

- Born: Auwal H Yadudu; 1953 (age 72–73); Funtua, Katsina State
- Education: Ahmadu Bello University
- Occupations: Professor; Vice chancellor
- Notable work: Legal adviser to the late head of state, General Sani Abacha; Dean of the Faculty of Law at Bayero University; Vice-chancellor of the Federal University, Birnin Kebbi, Kebbi State, Nigeria.

Auwal Yadudu (born 1953) is a Nigerian academic. He is a professor of law and the current vice-chancellor of the Federal University, Birnin Kebbi, Kebbi State, Nigeria.

== Early life ==
Yadudu was born in Funtua, Katsina State. He earned his diploma in law in 1978 from Ahmadu Bello University in Zaria. He proceeded to obtain his Bachelor of Laws there in 1979. He later earned his Master of Laws in 1982 and Doctor of Judicial Science from Harvard Law School in the United States in 1985.

== Career ==
He served as dean of the Faculty of Law at Bayero University. Yadadu served as the legal adviser to the late head of state, General Sani Abacha. He also served as the deputy chairman of the National Conference Standing Committee on Law, Judiciary and Human Rights.

== Family ==
He was married to hajia Zainab Awalu and they had eight children. They had been together for many decades. On 8 January 2023, his wife died after a brief illness in a US hospital.
