= Temi E. Ologunorisa =

Nigerian climate scientist and academic

- Citizenship: Nigerian
- Occupations: Lecturer, climate scientists
- Spouse: Omolola Victoria Ologunorisa Akinola

Temi E. Ologunorisa is a Nigerian climate scientist. He served as Professor of Meteorology and Climate Science at the Federal University of Technology in Akure, Ondo State, Nigeria since 2016. He also teaches geography as an adjunct professor at Liberty University in Lynchburg, Virginia, and Kansas City Kansas Community College in Kansas, both in the United States. He formerly served as the executive director of the Center for Black Culture and International Understanding, an organization connected with UNESCO, in Osogbo, Nigeria (2015–2016), where concerns of black empowerment and diaspora studies take center stage. He is also serving as the current Vice Chancellor at Olusegun Agagu University of Science and Technology, Okitipupa, Nigeria.

== Career ==
Ologunorisa earned his BSc (Hons) in geography from the University of Ibadan in Nigeria in 1988, his Msc in Environmental and Resource Planning from the Faculty of Environmental Science at the University of Jos in 1991, and his PhD in climatology from the University of Port Harcourt in Nigeria in 2002. He also holds minor degrees in geology and botany.

He was appointed a professor at Osun State University in October 2007. By accepting this position, Ologunorisa became the first professor to be appointed by Osun State University, where he had previously held honorably positions such as Chair of the Department of Geography and Resource Management (2007–2012), Pioneer Dean of the Faculty of Social Sciences (2013–2015), First Elected Provost of the College of Management and Social Sciences (2011–2013), Head of the Okuku Campus of Osun State University (2011–2013), and Chairman of the Committee of Provosts, In 2011, he also gave the university's First Inaugural Lecture.

In the field of flood hydroclimatology, Ologunorisa is regarded as a global expert. The US government awarded him the "Scholar of Extraordinary Ability Award" in 2018 due to the caliber and scope of his studies in climate science (Flood Hydroclimatology). The prize bestows on its winners the right to live permanently in the United States. He has nearly 100 publications to his name, including 60 articles in national and international peer-reviewed journals, 20 chapters in edited books, two books, three monographs, five edited books, 20 published conference proceedings, and six technical reports, demonstrating his extensive publication. Together with collaborators, he has received about $400,000.00 in grants.

Ologunorisa served as a visiting professor at McMaster University in Hamilton, Canada (2010), a visiting professor at Tokyo Metropolitan University in Japan (2009), a visiting scholar at the National University of Singapore (2012), an honorary visiting professor at Flinders University in South Australia (2009), and a visiting scientist at the University of Witwatersrand in South Africa (2012).

== Awards and honors ==
Ologunorisa has received a special invitation to join the American Association for the Advancement of Science (AAAS), in 2003. He was the second person from Africa to serve on the International Editorial Advisory Board of the International Journal of Meteorology, U.K., after winning the international nomination. He has positions on the editorial boards of CATENA, published by Elsevier; International Journal of Biometeorology; Natural Hazards; JAMBA, published by North-West University, Potchefstroom, South Africa; and Journal of Applied Geography, published by Springer. He served as Editor-in-Chief of the Journal of the Nigerian Meteorological Society (Journal of Meteorology and Climate Science) from 2008 to 2010, Editor-in-Chief of the Journal of Earth and Atmospheric Sciences from 2018 to 2021, Associate Editor of the Journal of the Association of Nigerian Geographers from 2004 to 2005, and Editor of the Nigerian Journal of Tropical Geography.

Olgunorisa belongs to the American Geophysical Union, the International Association of Hydrological Sciences, the Royal Meteorological Society, the UK's Tornados and Storm Research Organization, the UK's Association of Nigerian Geographers, and the UK's Annals of the Association of American Geographers.

== Personal life ==
He is married to Omolola Victoria Ologunorisa Akinola.
