= Crawford University =

University in Igbesa, Ogun State, Nigeria

Coordinates: 6.5288°N 3.1358°E

- Crawford Hall, University of Mysore.jpg
- Motto: Knowledge with Godliness
- Type: Private University
- Established: 2005
- Parent institution: The Apostolic Faith Mission
- Chancellor: Rev. Isaac Adigun
- Vice-Chancellor: Professor Solomon Olanrewaju Makinde.
- Pro-Chancellor: Professor Felicia Alu Moh
- Faculty: College of Natural and Applied Sciences, College of Business and Social Sciences, College of Arts and Communication Studies.
- Location: Igbesa, Ogun State, Nigeria
- Campus: Faith City, Ketu Adie Owe, Igbesa Ogun State, Nigeria.
- Website: http://www.crawforduniversity.edu.ng
- Location within Nigeria

Crawford University is a private Christian University in Igbesa, Ogun State in Nigeria. It is owned by the Apostolic Faith Mission.

== History ==
Crawford University was established in 2005 by Paul Akazue, the then leader and third Overseer for the Apostolic Faith work across Africa. Crawford is located deep in the forest of Igbesa, Ogun state Rev. Paul Akazue was the Proprietor and the first installed Chancellor of the Crawford University. He died in May 2010.

== Vice Chancellors ==
- Professor Moses Toye Ige (June 2005 - September 2010)
- Professor Samson Ayanlaja (October 2010 - September 2015)
- Professor Isaac Rotimi Ajayi FNIP (October 5, 2015 - October 4, 2020)
- Professor Reuben Jiya Kolo (October 2020 – 2025)
- Professor Solomon Olanrewaju Makinde, MNAE, FLIPAN ( October 6, 2025 - Present)
