= Abdulrahman Asipita Salawu =

Nigerian academic

Vice-Chancellor of Confluence University of Science and Technology
- Incumbent
- Assumed office 2023
- Preceded by: Salawu Sadiku

Personal details
- Born: Abdulrahman Asipita Salawu
- Profession: Academic

Abdulrahman Asipita Salawu is a professor and the incumbent Vice-Chancellor of Confluence University of Science and Technology. He was appointed in 2023 after the tenure of his predecessor, Salawu Sadiku.

== Career ==
Salawu is a professor of Materials and Metallurgical Engineering and was an active member of the Technical and Implementation Committees before his appointment as the Vice-Chancellor in 2023.
