= Peter Olapegba =

Nigerian academic (born 1970)

14th Vice-chancellor of University of Ibadan
- Incumbent
- Assumed office November 2026
- Preceded by: Kayode Adebowale

Personal details
- Born: Peter Olamakinde Olapegba; January 26, 1970 (age 56) Ibadan, Oyo State, Nigeria
- Education: University of Ibadan
- Occupation: Academic, university administrator, psychologist

Peter Olamakinde Olapegba (born January 1970) is a Nigerian psychologist, academic, and university administrator. He is a professor of psychology at the University of Ibadan. In July 2026, he was appointed the 14th Vice-Chancellor of the University of Ibadan and is expected to assume office on 1 November 2026.

== Background and education ==
Olapegba was born in Igbole quarters of Igboora, a town in Oyo state, Nigeria on the 26 January 1970. He started his education at Anglican Church primary school, Ilutitun Ondo state Nigeria and later St. Pauls African Primary School, Lanlate , Oyo State, where he obtained his Primary School Certificate in 1981. He thereafter attended Lanlate High School where he obtained his West African School Certificate in 1986. He thereafter proceeded to the University of Ibadan where he obtained his Bachelor of Science (B.Sc) degree in Psychology in 1997, a Master of Science (M.Sc) degree in Social/Personality Psychology in 1999 and his Doctor of Philosophy (Ph.D) in Applied Social Psychology in 2008.

== Career ==
Olapegba was appointed the 14th, Vice Chancellor of University of Ibadan on the 22 of July 2026, to succeed professor Kayode Oyebode Adebowale with effect from 1 November 2026. He joined the University of Ibadan as an assistant lecturer in 2000 and was promoted to professor in 2014. He had held several leadership positions within the institution including the Dean of the faculty of Social Sciences, Director of Alumni Relations and just before his appointment as the Chancellor, Olapegba was the deputy vice-chancellor (administration) of the university.

He is a member and fellow of several professional bodies. He is member of Social Science Academy of Nigeria, Nigerian Psychological Association,America Psychological Association, International Association of Applied Psychology (IAAP), Society for Personality and Social Psychology (SPSP) among others.

== Personal life ==
Olapegba is married with children.

== See also ==
- University of Ibadan
- List of vice chancellors in Nigeria
