= Oluwole Banjo =

Nigerian Academic

Oluwole Sikiru Banjo
- Born: Oru-Ijebu
- Citizenship: Nigeria
- Occupation: Academic
- Known for: 5th Vice Chacellor of Tai Solarin University

Academic background
- Education: University of Ibadan; Ogun State Ujniversity

Academic work
- Discipline: Wild Life and Ecotourism Management
- Institutions: Tai Solarin University

Oluwole Sikiru Banjo is a Nigerian professor of Wild Life and Ecotourism Management and former vice chancellor of Tai Solarin University of Education.

== Early life and education ==
Oluwole was born in Ijebu, Ogun State into the family of Alhaji Ayoola Banjo. He obtained his first degree from Ogun State University. He bagged his second degree in Personnel Psychology and bagged his doctorate in Wild Life and Ecotourism Management.

== Career ==
Banjo began his academic career in 1990 serving as a lecturer II at the then Tai Solarin College of Education. In 2012, he became a professor at the same institution. He also served as the deputy vice chancellor of the institution and served as the first dean of College of Vocational and Technology Education (COVTED).

== Memberships and awards ==
In 2026, he received a fellowship award from The Institute of Educational Leadership Practitioners of Nigeria (IELPN).
