= Sunday Paul Bako =

Nigerian academic

- Born: 1962 (age 63–64); Takum, Taraba State
- Occupation: Vice Chancellor Taraba State University
- Title: Professor
- Awards: Best Performing Vice Chancellor of the Year 2018

Academic background
- Education: Ahmadu Bello University Zaria

Academic work
- Discipline: Botanist
- Institutions: Taraba State University

Sunday Paul Bako (born 10 March 1962) is a Nigerian academic, researcher, and the third Vice Chancellor of Taraba State University, Jalingo.

== Early life and education ==
Sunday was born in Takum, Taraba State, on 10 March 1962. He obtained his first degree, B.Sc. (Botany) in 1986, his second degree, M.Sc. in 1990, and his third degree, Ph.D. (Plant Eco Physiology) in 2000 at the Ahmadu Bello University, Zaria.

== Career ==
Sunday Paul Bako began his career as a graduate assistant in 1987 at Ahmadu Bello University, Zaria. In 2006, he was promoted to the rank of Professor. Before his appointment as the Vice Chancellor of Taraba State University, Jalingo, he was the Vice Chancellor of Kwararafa University, Wukari.

== Administrative career ==
Sunday's administrative journey began when he was the Vice Chancellor of Kwararafa University, Wukari before he was appointed on March 1, 2022, as the Vice Chancellor of Taraba State University, Jalingo.

== Membership ==
He is a member of Botanical Society of Nigeria (BOSON) and the Ecological Society of Nigeria (EcoSON).

== Award ==
In 2018, he was awarded by Rotaract Club District 9125 as the Best Performing Vice Chancellor of the Year.

== Publications ==
Sunday has, as a researcher, contributed to the world of knowledge with over 120 publications; some of these are:

- Effects of Plant Age, Ascorbate and Kinetin Applications on Nitrate Reductase Activity and Leaf Protein Content of Maize (Zea mays L.) Plants Grown under Heat Stress
- Occurrence and Distribution of Aquatic Macrophytes in Relation to the Nutrient Content in Sediments of Two Freshwater Lake Ecosystems in the Nigerian Savanna
- Trace Metal Contents of the Emergent Macrophytes Polygonum sp.and Ludwigia sp. In Relation to the Sediments of Two Freshwater Lake Ecosystems in the Nigerian Savanna
