= Kayode Soremekun =

- Born: Kayode Soremekun
- Occupations: A Nigerian Academic, Secomd substantive vice chancellor of Federal University Oye Ekiti, Ekiti state.

Kayode Soremekun is a Nigerian academic, author, and the third vice chancellor of Federal University Oye Ekiti, Ekiti State. He assumed duty after the sacking of professor Isaac Asuzu by President Mohammadu Buhari who took over from Professor Chinedu Nebo, the pioneer Vice Chancellor

== Early life ==
Soremekun attended Nigeria's premier secondary grammar school, King's College Lagos, from 1967 to 1971. He attended the University of Ife now Obafemi Awolowo University where he obtained a B.A. English/History and a M.Sc. and Ph.D. in International relations. The Ph.D. was on Nigeria's petroleum policy and international relations. Soremekun undertook postdoctoral studies at the Institute of Social Studies in The Hague, Netherlands and the University of Maryland College Park, US where he studied international law and the US foreign policy process, respectively.

== Career ==
Soremekun worked in several universities in Nigeria, including Obafemi Awolowo University, University of Lagos, Covenant University and the National Open University of Nigeria.

During tenure as Vice Chancellor in Federal University Oye, he added eleven Faculties. It offers virtually all the courses on offer in Nigeria's First Generation Universities. He was commended by the University Council, and very much the same commendation was in his exit letter from the university.

He retired from Obafemi Awolowo University as Dean. In his memoirs he referred to the fact that a refurbishment of the Faculty of Administration took place courtesy of the funds that he was able to source from Nigerian Breweries Limited. Faculties including Law, Social Sciences, and Education followed suit.

== Works ==
Soremekun has edited several books, including Governance and Democratization in Nigeria (1995), and Nigeria's Second Republic (1988).

He also worked as a staff writer in political affairs, for Federal Radio Corporation of Nigeria, and for Times International and Daily Times of Nigeria. He served on the editorial board of Daily Times Lagos. He was an editorial training instructor for Times Newspaper Training Centre, Daily Times Lagos. He was a visiting editorial board member of The AM News, a pro-democracy, quasi-guerilla newspaper during military rule in Nigeria. He worked as a visiting editorial board member of The Guardian and The Compass newspapers. Prior to his assumption of office as Vice-Chancellor he served as chairman of the editorial board of Business Day, a daily business newspaper in Nigeria.

Soremekun has published journal articles on inter-related areas of conflict, petroleum politics, and energy resources.

He has around 50 peer-reviewed publications. Soremekun served as External Examiner to the University of Ghana, Legon. He has also served as a Visiting Lecturer in the Peace Studies Program in the Universitat Jaime 1 in Castellon, Spain.

== Recognition ==
- Scholarship student in Kings College, Lagos. (1967 -1971)
- National Scholar Award, (1973 - 1976)
- Ford Foundation Scholar (1991)
- Senior Fulbright Research Scholar (2003)
- Resident Rockefeller Scholar in Bellagio Italy (2003)
