= Haruna Dantoro Dlakwa =

Nigerian Academic

Acting Vice-Chancellor of Bayero University
- Incumbent
- Assumed office April 2024

Personal details
- Born: Haruna Dantoro Dlakwa
- Profession: Academic

Haruna Dantoro Dlakwa is a professor and the immediate acting Vice Chancellor of Borno State University located in Maiduguri, Nigeria. He was appointed by the Borno Governor, Babagana Umara Zulum upon the recommendation of the school's governing council at her 10th meeting held on the 15th of April, 2024.

== Career ==
He was the Deputy Vice-Chancellor Academic at BUK before his appointment as the Acting Vice-Chancellor of the school in 2024.
