= Zamfara State University =

Public university in Zamfara State, Nigeria

- Type: Public
- Established: 2018
- Founder: Abdul'aziz Yari
- Vice-Chancellor: Prof. Yahaya Zakari Abdullahi
- Location: Talata Mafara Zamfara, Nigeria. 12.569853°N 6.0448891°E

Zamfara State University is a public higher learning institution located in Talata Mafara, Zamfara State, Nigeria. It was established in 2018. The university was founded and established in 2018 by the then Ex-governor of Zamfara State, Abdul'aziz Yari for the expansion of higher learning education in the state.

== Library ==
On January 4, 2015, the Federal University Gusau Library opened its doors at the university's permanent location with just over 4,000 books and 265 publications (local and international). The majority of the gifts for the collection came from Book Aid for Africa and the Sir Emeka Offor Foundation, followed by contributions from Prof. A. D. Forbes and Allen Forbes, the Gusau Institute, and a few other well-known organizations and people.

Currently, the main library is housed in the newly constructed Multipurpose Hall, which is close to the University Medical Center and the Faculty of Humanities & Education. Three faculties and seventeen departments within the university are served by the library. The library’s collection includes about twenty one thousand six hundred and eighty six (21,686) volumes of books and about one thousand five hundred and fifty five (1,555) volumes of periodicals/serials, which are made up of domestic and international journals, newsletters, magazines, bulletins, and other publications.

== Courses offered ==
Basic Medical Sciences.

1. B.Sc. Physiotherapy
2. B.Sc. Nursing
3. B.Sc. Public Health
4. B.Sc. Human Diet and Nutrition

== See also ==
Academic libraries in Nigeria
