= Edward Olanipekun =

Nigerian academics

Vice-Chancellor of Ekiti State University
- In office 2019–2024
- Preceded by: Olubunmi Ajayi
- Succeeded by: Joseph Babatola Ayodele

Personal details
- Born: Edward Olorunnisola Olanipekun
- Education: University of Ibadan, Bayero University Kano
- Profession: Academic

Edward Olorunnisola Olanipekun is a professor of Industrial Chemistry and the Vice-Chancellor of Ekiti State University between 2019-2024. ICT University, Yaounde, Cameroon honoured the former VC with a lifetime award alongside Olusegun Obasanjo in 2021. Olanipekun was honoured by the Center for Ethics and Self Value Orientation of Nigeria (CESVO) with gold medal of University Administrator of Nigeria, Integrity Icon of Nigeria (IION) and a Certificate of Excellence in Ethical Leadership award in 2022. The 1982 set of Mary Immaculate Grammar School, Ado-Ekiti honoured his 5 years tenure in office with a luncheon in August 2024.

== Career ==
Olanipekun was promoted to a professor in 2003, he was the former Dean of the School of Post Graduate Studies of Ekiti State University and the former Chairman, Ilorin Zone of Academic Staff Union of Universities. He was appointed the Vice-Chancellor in 2019 by the former state Governor, Kayode Fayemi following the removal of Olubunmi Ajayi, who was the Acting Vice-Chancellor in 2018.
