= Abiola Ajimobi Technical University =

State University in Oyo, Nigeria

Coordinates: 11°04′N 7°42′E

- Former names: First Technical University, Ibadan
- Type: State, Technical
- Established: 2017
- Chancellor: Tunde J Afolabi
- Vice-Chancellor: Adesola Ajayi
- Academic staff: 1000+
- Location: Ibadan, Oyo State, Nigeria
- Campus: Urban
- Colours: Orange and Green
- Nickname: TECH-U
- Website: tech-u.edu.ng

Abiola Ajimobi Technical University formerly known as the First Technical University, Ibadan is a state-owned and the first technical University in Nigeria located in Oyo state. It was approved by National Universities Commission in 2012. The University was renamed Abiola Ajimobi Technical University by Seyi Makinde in honour of the immediate past Governor of Oyo State, Abiola Ajimobi.

== History ==
TECH-U was approved as a University by the Nigerian University Commission in 2012 with new students admitted in September 2013, the First location put in place by Ajimobi was Ibadan Expressway. On the 10th of February 2021, NUC approved 13 courses in the First Technical University, Oyo State with the school being the first accredited for Forensic science aside Nigerian Defence Academy. The other courses approved her environmental and engineering courses.

== Administration ==
First Technical University has a Chancellor as its ceremonial head while a Vice-chancellor carry out the administrative work in the school. The tenure of office is usually five years non-renewable years.

Vice chancellors
		Tenure	Profession
1	Ayobami Salami	2017–2022	Environmental consultant
2	Adesola Ajayi	2022–2027	Plant Scientist
