= Vincent Ado Tenebe =

Nigerian agronomist

Professor Vincent Ado Tenebe
- Born: August 17, 1958 (age 68); Kaduna, Nigeria
- Citizenship: Nigeria
- Education: Ahmadu Bello University (MSc); Abubakar Tafawa Balewa University (Ph.D)
- Children: 5
- Scientific career
- Fields: Agronomy

Vincent Ado Tenebe (born 17 August 1958) is a Nigerian agronomist. He is the former vice chancellor of Taraba State University, Jalingo, and also the former vice chancellor of National Open University of Nigeria.

== Early life and education ==
He was born in Kaduna, Nigeria, on August 17, 1958. He obtained his Primary School Leaving Certificate from St. Patrick Primary school Maiduguri between 1965 and 1971. He obtained his West African School Certificate in 1976 from Government Secondary School, Yerwa, Maiduguri, Nigeria. He bagged his first degree, B.Sc. (Agric) cum laude, and second degree, M.Sc. in agronomy at Ahmadu Bello University, Zaria; and he earned his Ph.D. in agronomy at Abubakar Tafawa Balewa University, Bauchi.

== Career ==
Vincent Ado Tenebe started as a graduate assistant in 1984 at Abubakar Tafawa Balewa University. In 1988, he was made the head of the university farm. In 1995, he became the head of the department of Crop Production of the institution. In 2003, he became a professor of agronomy at the African University of Science and Technology, Bauchi.

== Administrative career ==
Vincent became deputy vice chancellor of National Open University on 7 March 2008. He became the second vice chancellor of National Open University of Nigeria, on October 14, 2010. In 2017, he became the vice chancellor of Taraba State University.

== Membership and fellowship ==
In 1986, he became a member of Agriculture Society of Nigeria (ASN) 1986. A year later, he became a member of Farm Management Association of Nigeria. In 2002, he became a Fellow of the Institute of Cost Management (FCM). In 2012, he became a Fellow of the National Institute for Education and Research (FNIER) and in the same year he became a Fellow of Nigeria Society for Experimental Biology (FNISEB). A year later, he became a Fellow of the Association of Nigerian Teachers (FASSONT). In 2014, he became a Fellow of the Chartered Institute of Human Capital Development of Nigeria and in 2015, he became a Fellow of Biotechnology Society of Nigeria (FBSN).
