= Salawu Sadiku =

Nigerian academic

Vice-Chancellor of Confluence University of Science and Technology
- In office 2020–2023

Personal details
- Born: Salawu Sadiku
- Profession: Academic

Salawu Sadiku is a professor who was the first Vice-Chancellor of Confluence University of Science and Technology. He was appointed in 2020 by the Kogi State Government following the establishment of the institution.

== Career ==
Sadiku was appointed as the first vice-chancellor of Confluence University of Science and Technology in 2020 by Yahya Bello in 2020. He was replaced by Abdulrahman Asipita Salawu, a professor of Materials and Metallurgical Engineering in 2023.
