= Folagbade Aboaba =

Nigerian academic (1933–2023)

Folagbade Olajide Aboaba
- Born: 8 March 1933; Lagos
- Died: 21 January 2023 (aged 89); Lagos
- Citizenship: Nigeria

Academic background
- Education: University of Ibadan; Colleges of Durham University; University of Wisconsin–Madison

Academic work
- Discipline: Agricultural engineering.
- Institutions: University of Ibadan

Folagbade Olajide Aboaba (8 March 1933 – 21 January 2023) was a Nigerian emeritus professor of agricultural engineering. He was the founding pro-chancellor and chairman of the Governing Council of Redeemer's University, and an assistant general overseer of the Redeemed Christian Church of God (RCCG).

== Early life and education ==
Aboaba was born on 8 March 1933 in Lagos, Nigeria, to Mr and Mrs J. B. Aboaba. He attended C.M.S. Grammar School, Lagos, between 1944 and 1949. He obtained his first degree in agricultural engineering from the University College, Ibadan, in 1959. He obtained his master's degree in agricultural engineering from King's College, University of Durham, in 1962. In 1971, he bagged his PhD in agricultural engineering from the University of Wisconsin–Madison in the United States.

== Academic career ==
Aboaba started his lecturing career in 1964 as a part-time lecturer in agricultural engineering at Obafemi Awolowo University, Ile-Ife. In 1965 he joined the University of Ibadan, where he remained until he retired in 1992. In 1975, he became the first dean of the Faculty of Technology at the University of Ibadan, and in 1976 he became a professor of agricultural engineering and eventually became an emeritus professor.

== Membership and fellowship ==
Aboaba was one of the founding members of the Nigerian Institution of Agricultural Engineers (NIAE), a member of the American Society of Agricultural and Biological Engineers (ASABE) and a fellow of the Institution of Agricultural Engineers in the United Kingdom.

== Redeemer's university ==
Aboaba served as the first pro-chancellor and chairman of the Governing Council of Redeemer's University from 2005 to 2013.

== Religious life and death ==
Aboaba was an assistant general overseer and a member of the Board of Trustees of the Redeemed Christian Church of God.

Aboaba died on 21 January 2023, at the age of 89 in Lagos, some weeks before his 90th birthday, after a brief illness.
