= Ademola S. Tayo =

Nigerian professor of Development Education

- Citizenship: Nigeria
- Education: University of Ibadan
- Occupation: Academic

Ademola S. Tayo is a Nigerian professor of Development Education who was the president and vice-chancellor of Babcock University ending his tenure in 2025.Tayo is also a fellow of Chartered Institute of Administration's College of Fellows.

== Education and career ==
Ademola S. Tayo is a graduate of Agricultural Economics in University of Ibadan. After graduating, Tayo began a colporteuring programme in 1989 in Sweden and 1993 in Norway where he completed his master's and PhD program in Development Education particularly in Religious Education.

Tayo was employed at Babcock University upon his return in 1999 and soon became a full professor. At Babcock University, Tayo have served as the Director of Academic Planning, Head of department, Dean of the Postgraduate School and a visiting professor to University of Eastern Africa and served as an Interim vice-chancellor at Adventist University of Cosendai in Cameroon.

== Personal life ==
Tayo met his wife in 1987 and got married in 1994. He went on to become the president of Babcock University.
