= Akinwale Coker =

Nigerian academician and former Vice-chancellor

- Occupation: Academic

Academic background
- Education: University of Ibadan; Obafemi Awolowo University

Academic work
- Discipline: Civil and Biomedical Engineering
- Institutions: University of Ibadan; Moshood Abiola University of Science and Technology

Akinwale Oladotun Coker is Nigerian professor of Civil and Biomedical Engineering and a Vice-chancellor of Moshood Abiola University of Science and Technology (MAUSTECH) Abeokuta in Nigeria.

== Early life and education ==
Akinwale was born in Abeokuta, Ogun state Nigeria on the 11 September, 1966. He obtained his primary school leaving certificate from St. Murumba Catholic Primary School at Ile-Ife in 1977. He obtained his secondary school certificate from John's Grammar school,Okey Atan Ile-Ife in 1982. He bagged his bachelor degree in civil engineering at the University of Ibadan in 1987. He obtained his MSc also in civil Engineering at Obafemi Awolowo University, Osun State in 1991. In 2002, he obtained his doctorate in environmental Engineering in University of Ibadan. In 2004, with a MacArthur Foundation Fellowship, he did his postdoctoral training at the Institute of Environmental Medicine and Hospital Epidemiology of the University of Freiburg Hospital in Germany, between February and July.

== Career ==
Akinwale started his career as a Grade II lecturer in department of civil engineering at University of Ibadan, Nigeria in 1991. In 2002, he became a senior lecture and he became a professor in 2010. In 2019, he was appointed as a Vice chancellor of Moshood Abiola of University of Science and Technology Ibadan in 2019.

== Selected publications ==
- Coker, A., Sangodoyin, A., Sridhar, M., Booth, C., Olomolaiye, P., & Hammond, F. (2009). Medical waste management in Ibadan, Nigeria: Obstacles and prospects
- Coker, A. O., Awokola, O. S., Olomolaiye, P., & Booth, C. (2008). Challenges of urban housing quality and its associations with neighbourhood environments: Insights and experiences of Ibadan City, Nigeria.
- Coker, A. O., Achi, C. G., Sridhar, M. K. C., & Donnett, C. J. (2016). Solid waste management practices at a private institution of higher learning in Nigeria.
