= Taraba State University =

Public university in Jalingo, Nigeria

Coordinates: 8.90021°N 11.31686°E

Taraba State University, Jalingo
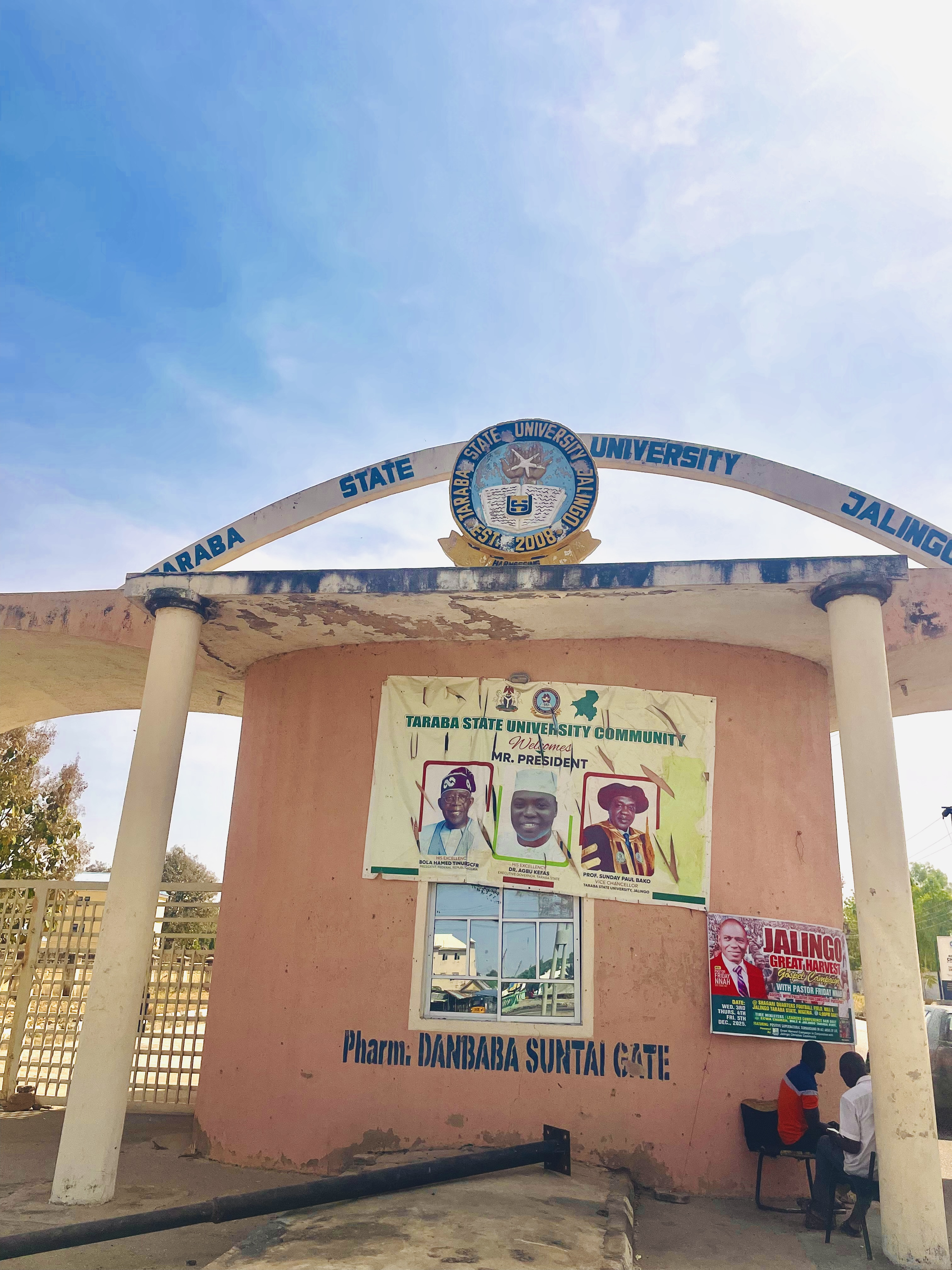
- Motto: Harnessing Nature's Gift
- Type: Public
- Established: 2008
- Accreditation: NUC
- Chancellor: Jeremiah Useni
- Vice-Chancellor: Sunday Paul Bako
- Location: Jalingo, Taraba State, Nigeria
- Campus: Urban
- Website: www.tsuniversity.edu.ng

Taraba State University also known as TSU is located in Jalingo, Taraba State Nigeria. The university was established by the Taraba State Government in 2008 to widen access to university education and promote economic growth and development in the state particularly and the country at large.

== Structure ==
The academic structure of the university consists of faculty-organized research units and relevant teaching and research support units. The department is the basic unit of academic organization aimed at enhancing interaction between related disciplines in the university. Though each unit of academic discipline is an organizational entity, they all have common teaching and research interests through the spirit of cooperative and interdisciplinary research and the development of group effort.

The administrative set up of a school is centered on the Dean's Office, while the departments concentrate essentially on academic matters and pursuits. The overall affairs of the university are guided by the council in policy and financial matters, while the senate determines all academic matters.

The vice-chancellor is the chief executive of the university and supervises the academic and administrative operations of the university under the directive and /or advice of relevant committees. Such committees include the council and its committees, the senate and its committees, council/senate joint committees, faculty boards, administrative committees and other statutory committees.

== Convocation ==
In 2018, Taraba State University conducted its first convocation ceremony which consisted of the 1st, 2nd, 3rd, 4th and 5th sets of graduates in this arena of this academia totaling 5900 students. Out of these students, 29 graduated with First Class Honors, 1006 Second Class Upper Division, 2083 Second Class Lower, 1850 with Third Class while 32 graduated with passes.

As of 2022, Taraba State University had conducted its 6th, 7th, 8th and 9th combined convocation ceremony where graduates sets of Taraba State University totaling 8,585 out of which 49 graduated with 1st Class Honors, 2,416 with Second Class Honors (Upper Division), 3,983 Second Class Honors (Lower Division), 790 Third Class (Honors) and 20 Pass Degrees.

The occasion also encompassed the conferment of Honorary Doctorate Degrees to four dignitaries who have shown themselves as role models in all ramifications and impacted people. They include Senator Ifeanyi Okowa, The Executive Governor, Delta State, Mahmud Mohammed, Former Chief Justice of Nigeria, Najeem Usman Yasin and Paul Tarfa (Executive Chairman, North East Development Commission).

== Vice chancellors ==
The first Vice Chancellor of the University at inception was Ahmed Usman Jalingo who served from 2008 to 2010. He died in March 2011. Following that, Michael Noku served as Acting Vice Chancellor until in January 2012, when the second vice chancellor, Mohammed Sani Yahaya took over the office until again when Catherine Musa Ashashim took over as Acting Vice Chancellor in October, 2016 to 28th February, 2017. On 1st March 2017, Vincent Ado Tenebe joined the list as the 3rd vice chancellor of the university. However, on 1 March 2022, Sunday Paul Bako became the Vice Chancellor, and he is the current Vice Chancellor of the university.

== Gallery ==
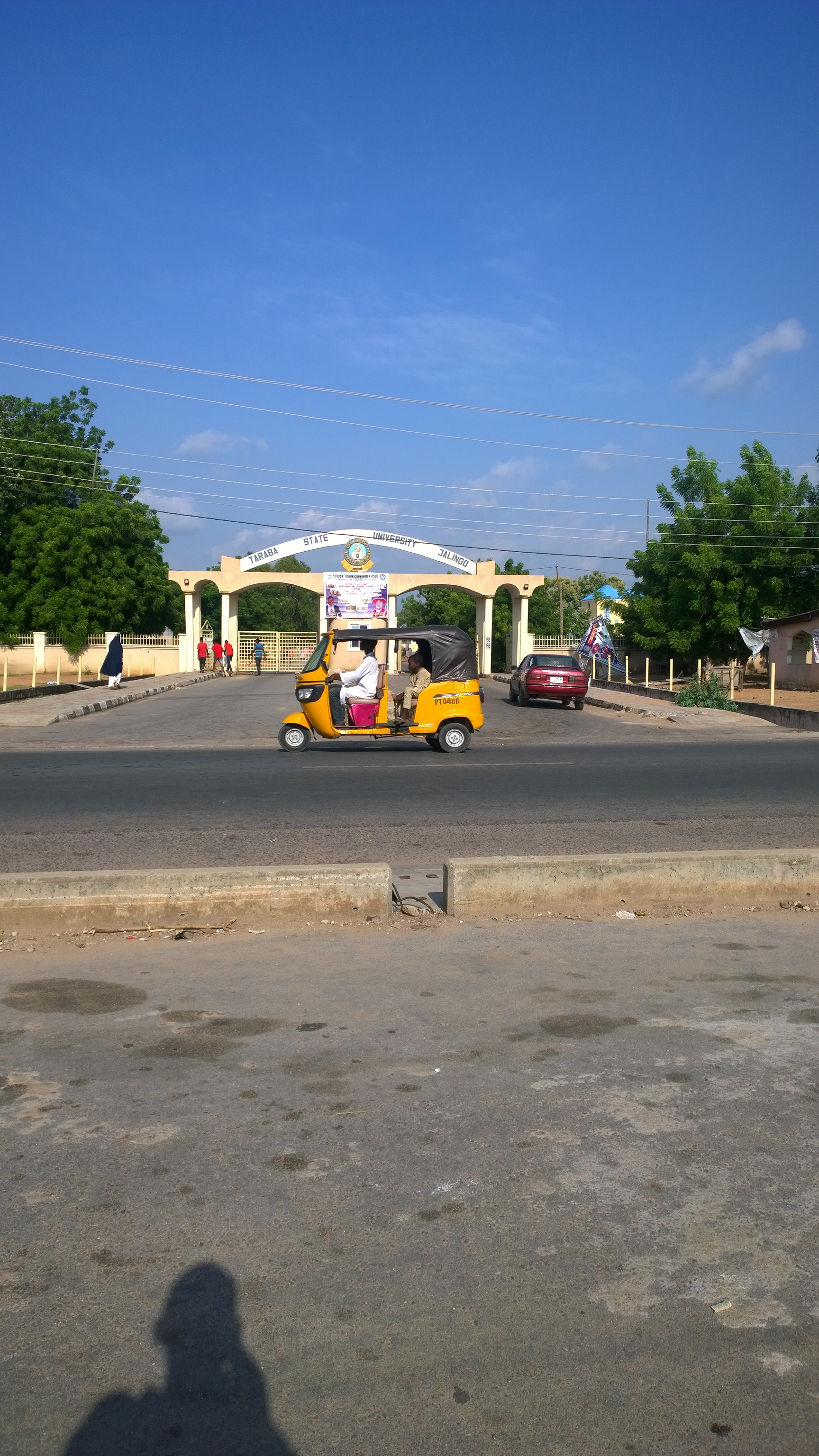

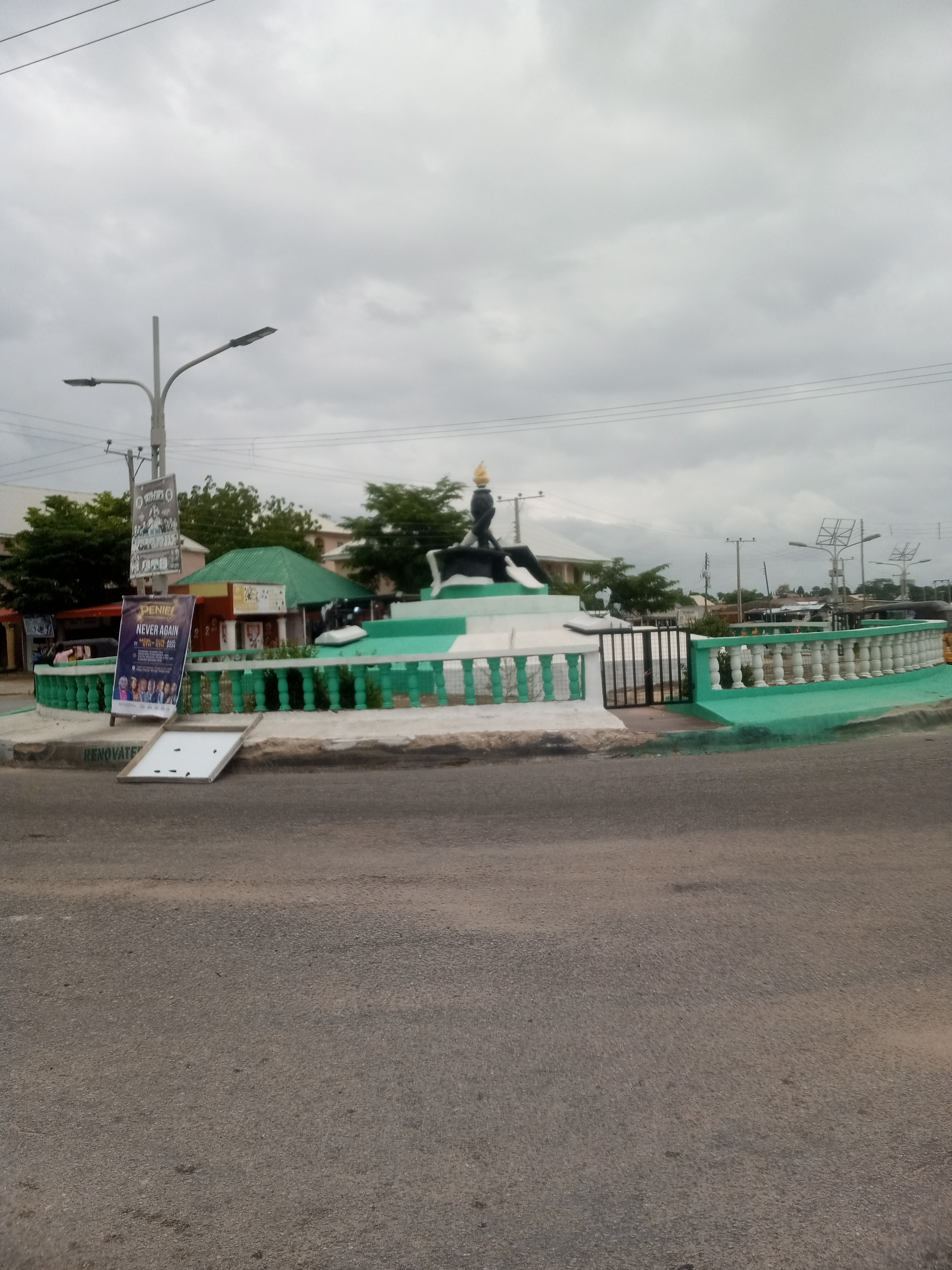

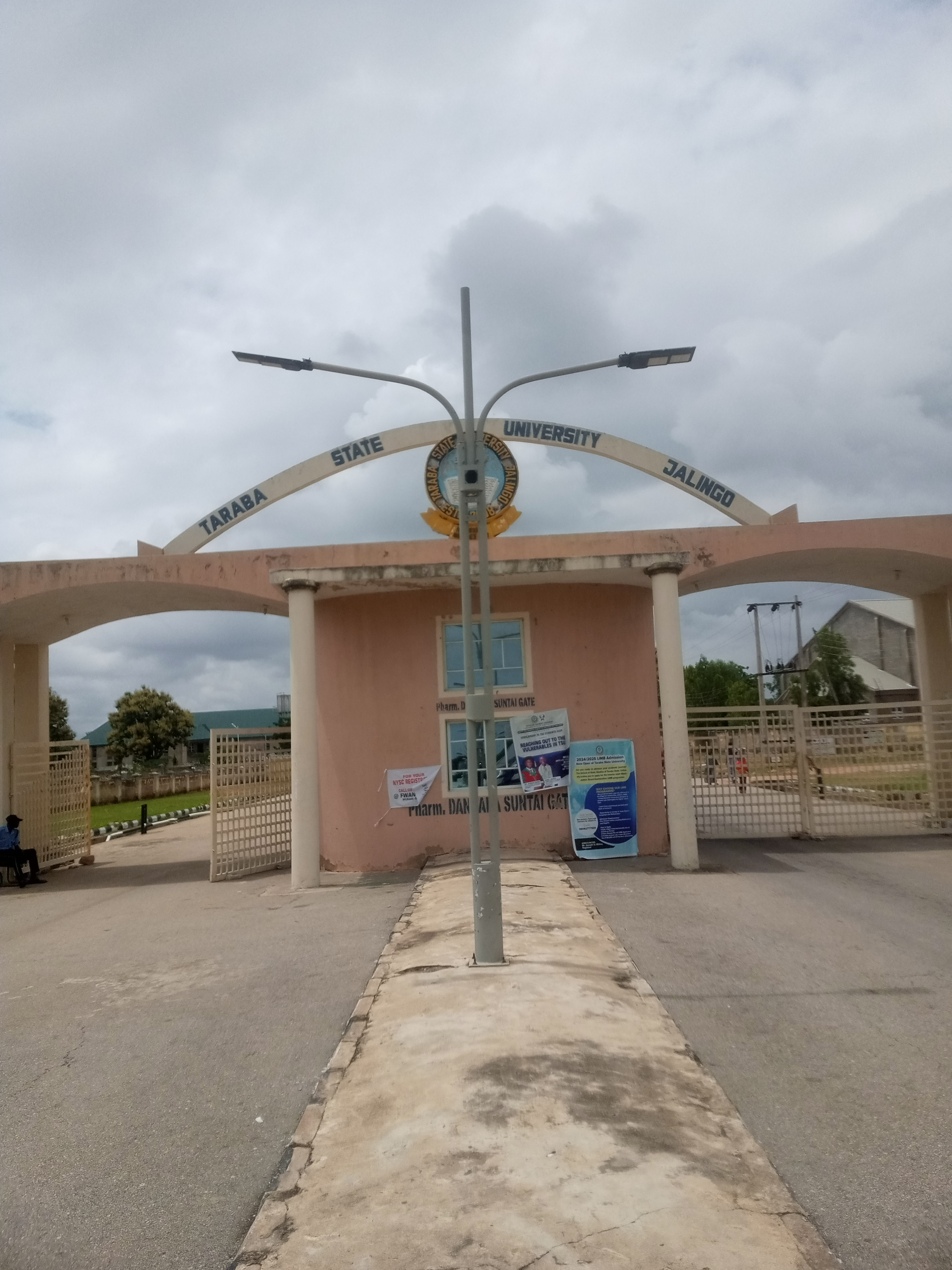

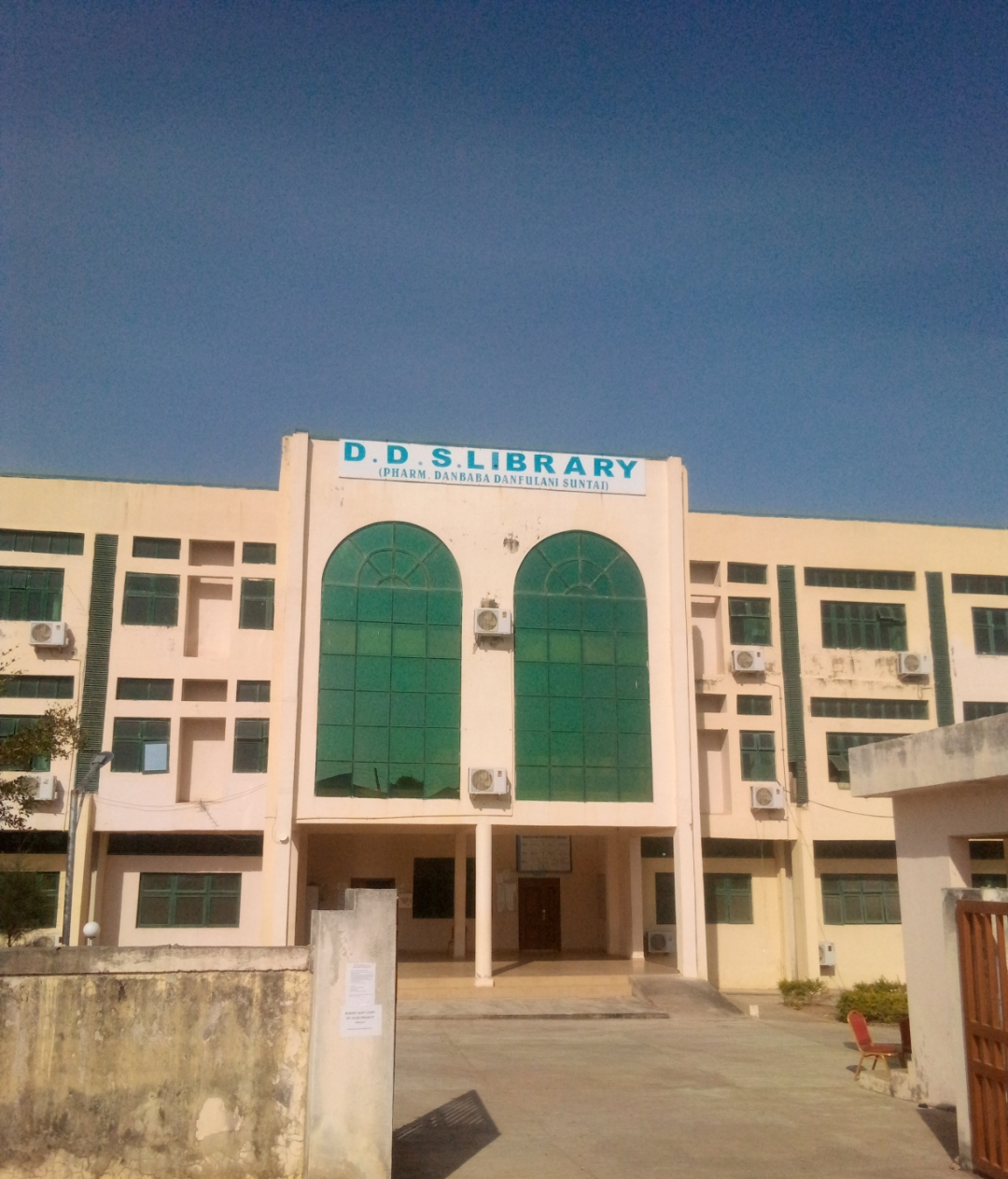
D.D.S Library taraba state University

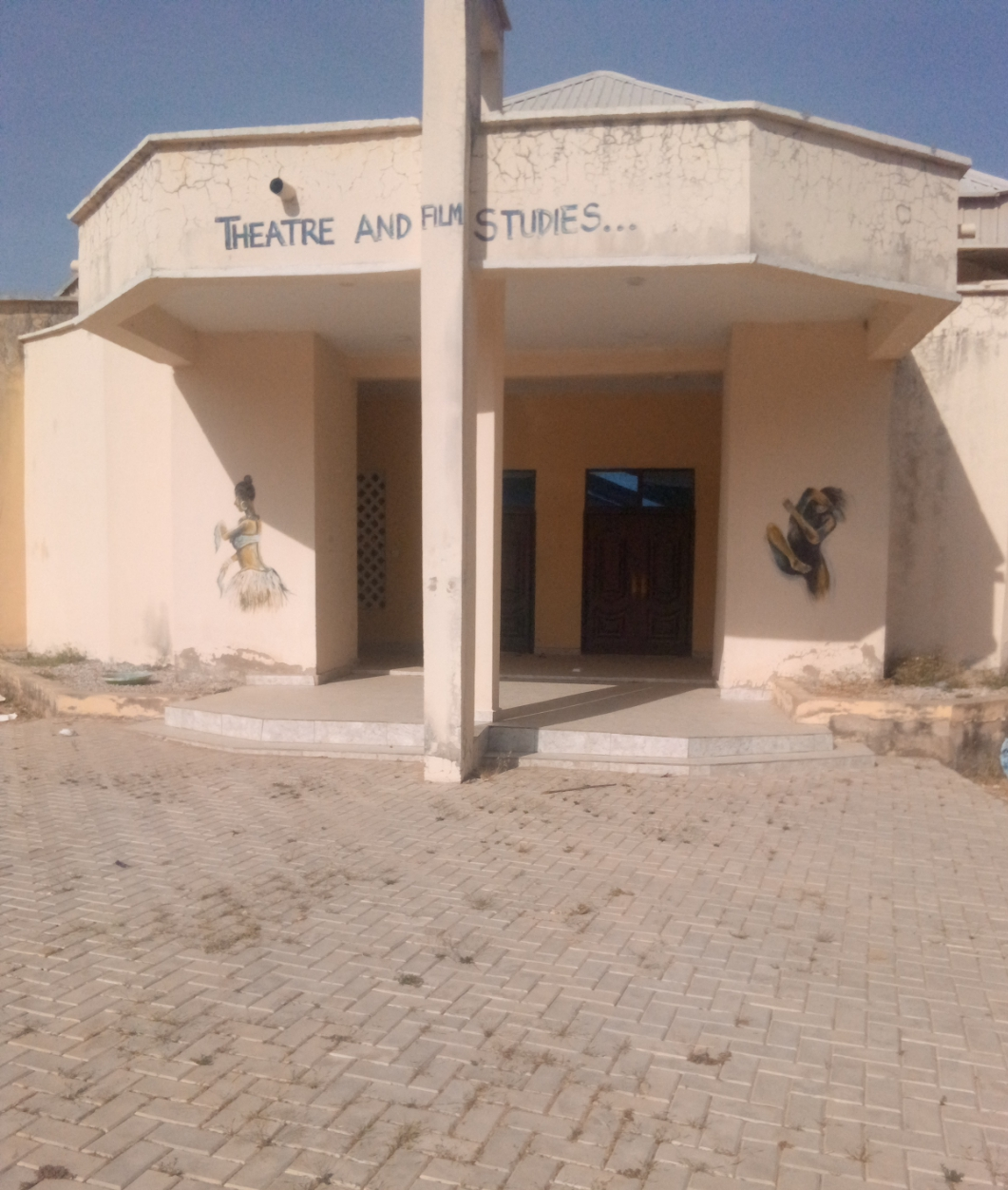
Theater Arena taraba state university

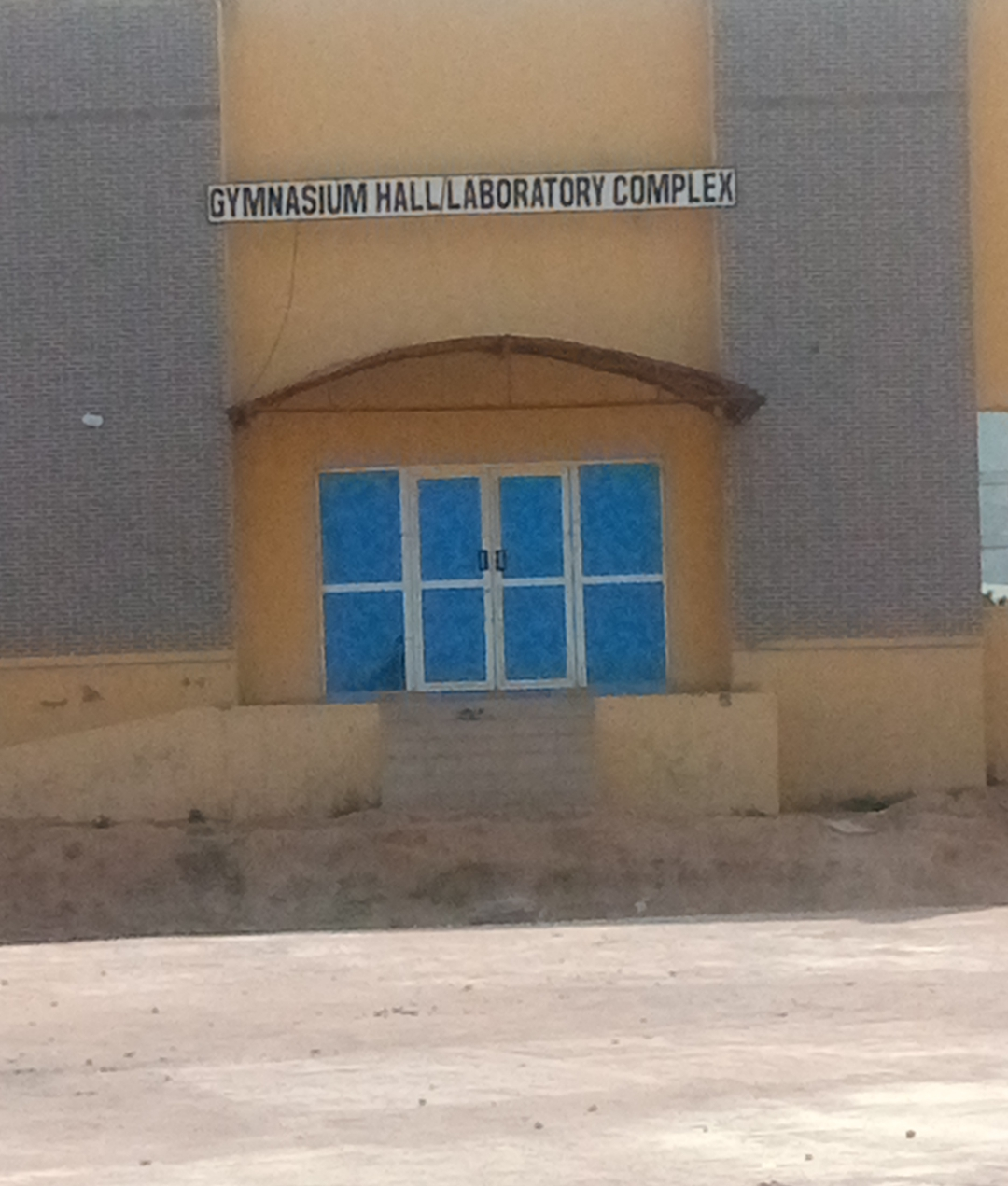
Gym unit taraba state university
