= Mustapha Sheikh Abdullahi =

Nigerian professor of International diplomacy

First Vice-Chancellor of the African Aviation and Aerospace University

Personal details
- Born: February 21, 1991 (age 35) Zaria, Kaduna State, Nigeria
- Education: Ahmadu Bello University; Nottingham Trent University
- Occupation: Public Servant
- Profession: Academic

Mustapha Sheikh Abdullahi born on 21 February 1991, he is a Nigerian professor of International Relations , and the First Vice Chancellor of African Aviation and Aerospace University.

== Early life and background ==
Abdullahi was born and raised in Zaria, Kaduna State, Nigeria. He obtained his first degree in International Relations from the Ahmadu Bello University and proceeded to the Nottingham Trent University, United Kingdom to Earned an MSc in Management and International Business. Abdullahi serves as the pioneer Registrar and current Vice-Chancellor of the African Aviation and Aerospace University (AAAU) in Abuja, Nigeria. As the chief administrative executive, he has spearheaded the institution's growth from its foundational planning stages into a specialized Pan-African academic hub dedicated to solving Africa’s aging aviation workforce challenges.

== Awards ==
Aviation Academic Excellence Award 15th NIGAV Awards (April 2026)
