= Samuel Edoumiekumo =

Nigerian Professor of Economics and VC of NDU

Samuel Gowon Edoumiekumo

Vice chancellor of Niger Delta University
- Incumbent
- Assumed office 2018
- Preceded by: Humphrey Ogoni

Acting Vice Chancellor of Niger Delta University
- In office 2017–2018
- Succeeded by: Prof. Allen Aziba-Odumosi Agih

Deputy Vice Chancellor of Niger Delta University

Personal details
- Born: Samuel Gowon Edoumiekumo; April 30, 1970
- Party: Non-Partisan

Samuel Gowon Edoumiekumo (born 30 April 1970) was a Nigerian professor of Economics who was the former deputy Vice Chancellor of Niger Delta University and the 4th substantive Vice Chancellor of same school.

== Background and early life ==
Samuel Edoumiekumo obtained his First School Leaving Certificate from Akeindenowei primary school, Toru Angiama 1982 and his West Africa school certificate from Ajeromi Ifelodun High School, Lagos 1988. He held a Bachelor of Science Degree, a Master of Science Degree and two Doctor of Philosophy Degrees which he obtained from the University of Port Harcourt and the University of Nsukka in the field of Economics.

== Career ==
On 17 May 2017, the then Bayelsa State Governor, Seriake Dickson approved the appointment of Samuel Edoumiekumo as Acting Vice Chancellor following the expiration of the tenure of the former Vice Chancellor, Prof. Humprey Ogoni. On May 2, 2018, he was appointed the 4th substantive Vice Chancellor of the school until 2023 where he handed over to Prof. Allen Aziba-Odumosi Agih He was also the Chairman of the Committee of Vice-Chancellors of Nigerian Universities.
