= Confluence University of Science and Technology =

Nigerian Technical University

- Type: State, Technical
- Established: 2020
- Vice-Chancellor: Abdulrahman Asipita Salawu
- Location: Okene, Kogi, Nigeria
- Campus: Urban
- Colours: Brown and White
- Website: custech.edu.ng

Confluence University of Science and Technology is a technical university located in Kogi State. The institution received full approval from the Nigerian University Commission for all its courses in 2024.

== History ==
On 19 August 2020, the Kogi State Assembly passed a bill to establish another institution in the state alongside the existing ones. In 2024, the NUC approved Medicine, Law, and other core courses to be taught at the school. In February 2024, Anatomy, Physiology, and other medical-related courses were also approved.

In December 2024, the conversion of the Reference Hospital, Okene, into the Confluence University of Science and Technology (CUSTECH) Teaching Hospital was signed into law by Ahmed Usman Ododo and passed by the Kogi State House of Assembly.

== Library ==
To support teaching, learning and research, the University Library was established in March 2021 with few numbers of staff, which include the University Librarian, one Librarian II and two other supporting staff. The University Library had six hundred (600) volumes of books at the initial take off, but now it has grown to over one thousand collections

== Abduction case ==
On 13 May 2024, students were abducted on campus while they were in the school premises studying for their first-semester exam. The kidnappers entered a classroom, fired gunshots and abducted several students during the attack.

In early May 2024, an undisclosed number of students were rescued by the Kogi State Government after an encounter with the kidnappers at their hideout.

The management of Confluence University of Science and Technology declared a three-day break to mourn the students killed during the attack.

== Admission ==
The school holds admission for students through the Joint Admissions and Matriculation Board (JAMB) for 50 courses across 8 faculties in the university, with the minimum JAMB score being 140.

== Administration ==
Confluence University of Science and Technology has a Chancellor as its ceremonial head, while a vice-chancellor carries out the administrative work in the school. The tenure of office is usually 4 non-renewable years.

Vice chancellors
		Tenure	Profession
1	Salawu Sadiku	2020–2023	Structural Engineer
2	Abdulrahman Asipita Salawu FNSE, FNME	2023–2028	Materials and Metallurgical Engineer
