= Okechukwu Onuchukwu =

Nigerian professor

Vice chancellor of Ignatius Ajuru University of Education
- Incumbent
- Assumed office 2021
- Preceded by: Professor Ozo-Mekuri Ndimele

Personal details
- Born: Okechukwu Onuchukwu Rumuohia , Rivers State
- Party: Non-Partisan
- Spouse: Joy Chika Okey Onuchukwu

Okechukwu Onuchukwu is a Nigerian professor of economics and currently the acting vice chancellor of Ignatius Ajuru University of Education, Rivers State. A position that the Government of Rivers State, through the office of the Governor and Visitor to the institution, appointed him on the 18th of November 2021.

Inaugural Lecture Titled

War of Supremacy between Unemployment and Inflation, who is the loser?

His inaugural lecture which focused on the War of Supremacy between Unemployment and Inflation, who is the loser? Noted that basically, it is the general public (the Society) that is actually the loser. Noting that there are two micro-economic evils existing side-by-side in the same economy, referred to as stagflation (stagnation and inflation). Inflation index plays a key role in the economy of a nation. In a normal theory, with high inflation we may have more employment and vice versa. However, we also have another situation where some challenges arises like fall in prices, less demand, and low income generation; here high inflation will results to low employment. A New Zealand economist, A. W. Philip developed the Philip’s curve which shows an inverse relationship between unemployment and inflation; hence whenever there is an increase in inflation, we experience less employment and vice versa. This curve enable us predict and control the economic projections. However, this curve doesn’t explain what is happening in the developing countries where there is an increase in inflation as well as an increase in unemployment. In this case, the masses become the losers

== Early life and background ==
Okechukwu graduated from the University of Port Harcourt in 1990 where he studied Economics and also graduated from the same school with a master's degree in economics in 1994.

He went on to obtain a Doctorate of Economics from the University of Port Harcourt in 1998.

== Career ==
Okechukwu has served as the Dean, Faculty of Social Science, University of Port Harcourt.

He has also served as the Director, University of Port Harcourt Business School and the Head of Economics Department, University of Port Harcourt.

He was appointed by the Governor Nyesom Wike administration in 2021 as the acting Vice chancellor of Ignatius Ajuru University of Education. His appointment took effect after the successful completion of the tenure of the past Vice Chancellor, Professor Ozo-Mekuri Ndimele. His appointment as the 3rd substantive vice Chancellor of the University was confirmed at the end of his tenure by the Governing council of the university in November 2026 and dated back to November 17th, 2021.
