= Federal University of Health Sciences, Azare =

Health-focused university in Nigeria

Coordinates: 11.670°N 10.219°E

Federal University of Health Science Azare
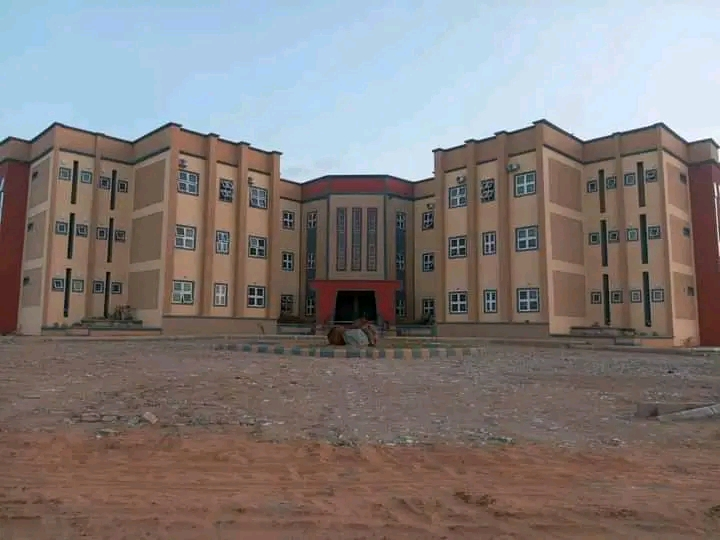
- Type: Public university
- Established: 2021
- Founder: Federal Government of Nigeria
- Accreditation: National Universities Commission
- Vice-Chancellor: Professor Bala Muhammad Audu
- Location: Azare local government area, Bauchi State
- Campus: Urban
- Language: English language
- Website: fuhsa.edu.ng

Federal University of Health Science, Azare (FUHSA) is a public university located at north eastern Nigeria. The university was established in 2021 with 760 pioneer student for the 2021/2022 and 2022/2023 merged academic sessions.

The university is located in Azare, the headquarters of Katagum Local Government Area in Bauchi State, Nigeria; founded under the administration of Muhammadu Buhari as one of the eleven new Federal Universities Established by Buhari's Administration across the six geo-political zones.

== Faculties and school ==
- Basic Medical Sciences
- Dentistry
- Allied Health Sciences
- Basic Clinical Sciences
- Clinical Sciences
- Integrated Health Sciences
- Sciences

== courses ==
The courses offered in Federal University of Health Science Azare include

1. Medicine and Surgery (M.B.B.S)
2. BDS Dentistry
3. Nursing Sciences
4. Human Nutrition and Dietetics
5. Radiography
6. Optometry
7. Audiology
8. Dental Therapy
9. Biostatistics
10. Physiotherapy
11. Environmental Health
12. Information Technology and Health Informatics
13. Anatomy
14. Biochemistry
15. Environmental Health
16. Physiology
17. Pharmacology
18. Public Health
19. Biology
20. Biostatistics
21. Biotechnology
22. Chemistry
23. Mathematics

== Administration ==
=== Chancellor ===
The pioneer chancellor of the university is Emir of Argungu Alhaji Sama'ila Muhammad Mera appointed in 2021

=== Vice-chancellor ===
The pioneer vice chancellor of the university is Professor Bala Mohammed Audu
