= Bayelsa Medical University =

University in Yenagoa, Nigeria

- Type: Public
- Established: August 2018
- Vice-Chancellor: Prof. Dimie Ogoina
- Total staff: 300+
- Students: 1000+
- Location: Yenagoa, Bayelsa State, Nigeria
- Website: bmu.edu.ng

Bayelsa Medical University (BMU) is located in Yenagoa, Bayelsa State in Nigeria. It was established in 2019 by then-governor of Bayelsa State, Seriake Dickson.

== Faculties ==
- Faculty of Clinical Sciences
- Faculty of Health Sciences
- Faculty of Basic Medical Sciences
- Faculty of Sciences
- Faculty of Pharmaceutical Sciences

== Faculty of Clinical Sciences ==
- Medicine and Surgery
- Dentistry

=== Approval of MBBS programme ===
The Medical and Dental Council of Nigeria gave approval to the school's MBBS program in 2024. This enables students to participate in the medical board exam for the qualification of students and smooth running of the program.

== Faculty of Health Sciences ==
- Nursing
- Optometry
- Physiotherapy
- Medical Laboratory Science
- Public Health
- Human Nutrition and Dietetics
- Community Health
- Radiography & Radiation Science
- Health Information Management
- Health Care Administration & Hospital Management

== Faculty of Basic Medical Sciences ==
- Human Anatomy
- Human Physiology
- Biochemistry

== Faculty of Sciences ==
- Physics with electronics
- Chemistry
- Microbiology
- Biology
- Mathematic
- Statistics

=== Librarian ===
The university librarian is Dr. Abraham Etebu.

== See also ==
- Academic libraries in Nigeria
- Federal University of Health Sciences, Azare
