= Ayobami Salami =

Nigerian academic and VC

Pioneer Vice-Chancellor of First Technical University, Ibadan
- In office September 2017 – May 2022

Personal details
- Born: Ayobami Salami
- Education: Obafemi Awolowo University
- Profession: Academic

Ayobami Salami is a professor, research consultant and the pioneer Vice-Chancellor of Ajimobi Technical University formerly known as First Technical University located in Ibadan,Oyo State.

== Career ==
He was the Deputy Vice-Chancellor Academic at Obafemi Awolowo University, the Vice-Chancellor of OAU and the Director, Institute of Ecology and Environmental studies before his appointment as the pioneer Vice-Chancellor of Ajimobi Technical University by the Oyo State Government in 2017 for a 5-year tenure.

== Controversy ==
There was protest in Obafemi Awolowo University when he was appointed as the Vice-Chancellor of the school before the end of tenure of his predecessor, Bamitale Omole who was accused of dishonesty. The Senior Staff Association of Nigerian Universities (SSANU) and the Non-Academic Staff of the school were also displeased with the appointment with claim that the appointment was illegal and an imposition of position on the university as a whole.
