= Federal University Oye Ekiti =

Public university in Oye-Ekiti, Nigeria

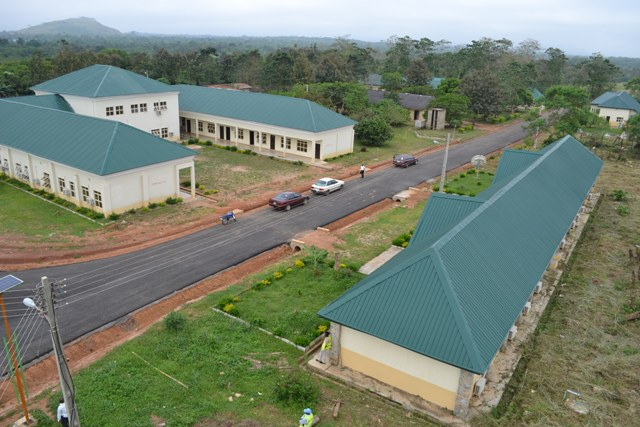
- Motto: Innovation and character for national transformation
- Type: Public
- Established: 2011
- Chairperson: Mohammed Yahuza
- Chancellor: Àtá Ígálá of the Igala Kingdom
- Vice-Chancellor: Joshua Olalekan Ogunwole
- Postgraduates: 1,500
- Location: Aare Afao Road, Oye, Ekiti, Ekiti, Nigeria; 7.7795923°N 5.3154551°E
- Campus: Oye Campus and Ikole Campus
- Colours: Green, white and gold
- Website: https://fuoye.edu.ng/

Federal University Oye Ekiti is a government-owned and operated Nigerian university. The university has two campuses located in the ancient cities of Oye-Ekiti and Ikole-Ekiti. The university was founded in 2011 as one of the federal universities established by the federal government of Nigeria during the administration of President Goodluck Jonathan.

== Undergraduate ==
Federal University Oye Ekiti offers undergraduate programmes in the fields of Agriculture, Arts, Law, Management Sciences, Social Sciences, Engineering, Education, Pharmacy, College of Medicine and Sciences.

The university has twelve faculties and a school of postgraduate studies.

Federal University Oye-Ekiti is poised towards the advancement of education in Nigeria especially in all the fields of interest. Since 2011, offers have been given to students across relevant educational backgrounds to undertake studies in all the faculties in the university. The school had its first graduating set in 2015, with its first convocation in April 2017.

Federal University Oye-Ekiti (FUOYE) was one of the nine federal universities established by the government of Nigeria, pursuant to an executive order made by the former President of Nigeria Dr. Goodluck Ebele Jonathan.

FUOYE's pioneer Vice Chancellor was Professor Chinedu Ostadinma Nebo, and was succeeded by Professor Kayode Soremekun, who was appointed by President Buhari in 2016. The current Vice-chancellor of the school is Professor A.S Fasina.

The varsity has two campuses at Oye-Ekiti and Ikole-Ekiti with the total population of 43000 student, and Faculties with over 58 Departments, namely:

- The Faculty of Agriculture (Agricultural Economics and Extension, Fisheries and Aquaculture, Soil and land management, Animal Production and Health, Crop Production and Horticulture, Food Science Technology, Water Resources and Meteorology, Tourism and hospitality).
- The Faculty of Basic Medical Sciences (Anatomy, Medical laboratory science, Physiology, Nursing, and Radiography and Radiation Sciences).
- The Faculty of Engineering (Agricultural and Bio-Resources Engineering, Civil Engineering, Computer Engineering, Electrical and Electronics Engineering, Mechanical and Mechatronics Engineering, Material and Metallurgical Engineering)
- The Faculty of Social Sciences (Demography and Social Statistics, Economics and Development Studies, Psychology, Sociology, Peace and Conflict Resolution, Political Science, Mass Communication)
- The Faculty of Arts/Humanities (English and Literary Studies, Theatre and Media Arts, History and International Relations, Linguistics)
- The Faculty of Science (Animal and Environmental Biology, Biochemistry, Geology, Computer Science, Geophysics, Industrial Chemistry, Mathematics, Microbiology, Physics, Plant Science and Biotechnology, Chemistry, Environmental Management and Toxicology )
- The Faculty of Education (Adult Education, Mathematics Education, English Education, Biology Education, Library and Information Science, Chemistry Education, Business Education, Agricultural Education, and Educational Management) With the total population of 4000, 2022/2023 session
- The Faculty of Management (Accounting, Finance, Public Administration, Business Administration).
- The Faculty of Law
- The Faculty of Pharmacy
- The Faculty of Medicine (Medicine and Surgery)

The university is looking forward to the start of another faculty in the next academic session, namely; Environmental Science, whose department includes; Architecture, Building, Estate Management, Surveying and Geoinformatics, Quantity Surveying, Urban and Regional Planning with required infrastructures being put in place.

The first vice-chancellor of the new university was Chinedu Nebo succeeded by Kayode Soremekun and the current vice-chancellor is Professor Abayomi Sunday Fasina.

== See also ==
- List of universities in Nigeria
- Education in Nigeria
