= Nigerian Meteorological Agency =

Nigeria government agency

- Abbreviation: NiMet

Agency overview
- Formed: 2003

Jurisdictional structure
- Federal agency (Operations jurisdiction): Nigeria
- Operations jurisdiction: Nigeria
- Legal jurisdiction: Nigerian Meteorological Agency
- Governing body: President of Nigeria
- Constituting instrument: Act of the National Assembly NiMet (Establishment) ACT 2003
- General nature: Federal law enforcement

Operational structure
- Headquarters: Bill Clinton Drive, Nnamdi Azikiwe International Airport, FCT,Abuja
- Agency executive: Prof. Charles Anosike, Managing Director/Chief Executive

Website
- https://nimet.gov.ng/about

Nigerian Meteorological Agency is an agency of Federal Republic of Nigeria with an oversight of national meteorological services which include providing expert advice to the Federal Government on meteorological matters, formulating and interpreting policy frameworks, and disseminating critical weather and climate forecasts to ensure the safe and efficient operation of aircraft, ships, and offshore oil installations.

== History ==
The Nigerian Meteorological Agency (NiMet) was formed in 1887 when meteorological services started in Nigeria at Akassa, Bayelsa State. The agency expanded to other parts of the country, with offices in Ilorin (1907), Lokoja (1909), Zungeru (1911), and Kano (1949). In 2019, a bill to repeal the 2003 act was introduced, and in 2022, the NiMet establishment act 2003 was replaced, granting the agency sole authority to grant approvals and licenses for meteorological stations and related matters. Today, NiMet is a leading provider of weather and climate services in Nigeria.

== Functions ==
The NiMet performed the functions of oversight of national meteorological services which include providing expert advice to the Federal Government on meteorological matters, formulating and interpreting policy frameworks, and disseminating critical weather and climate forecasts.

== Directorate ==
- Directorates
- Weather Forecasting Services
- Applied Meteorological Services
- Human Resource Management and Administration
- Engineering and Technical Services
- Finance and Accounts
- Research and Training
- Legal Services
- Public Affairs and Consumer Protection
- Corporate Services

== See also ==
- List of government space agencies
- Nigeria EduSat-1 (launched in 2017)
- Federal Ministry of Aviation (Nigeria)
