= Isaac Rotimi Ajayi =

Nigerian academic

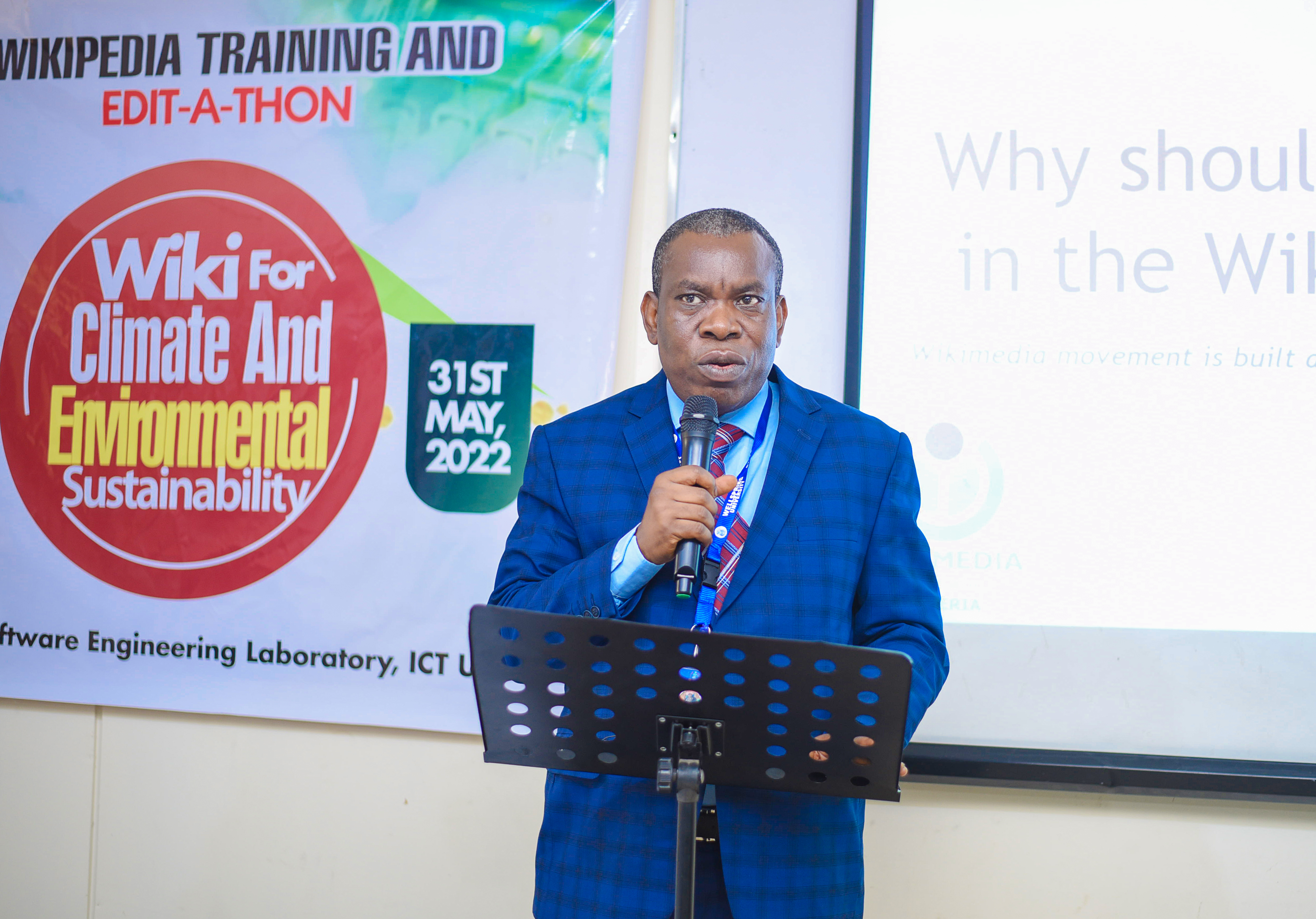
Prof._Isaac_Rotimi_Ajayi

Issac Rotimi Ajayi (born 20 March 1965) is a Nigerian physicist who serves as the Vice Chancellor of Wellspring University.

== Early life and education ==
Ajayi was born in Ondo State, Nigeria. He started his primary education at the St. James' Primary School in Akure and had his secondary education at the Ebun Ogunyimika College, Atosin, Idanre, both in Ondo State, Nigeria. He went on to study Physics in the University of Ibadan where he obtained his Bsc in 1983.

He then went for M.Sc. in Radiation & Health Physics and finally Ph.D respectively in 1990 and 1994 from the University of Ibadan in which he both obtained.

== Career ==
Ajayi started his careers as an Assistant Lecturer in Ondo State University in 1990. He then became the Professor of Radiation and Health Physics in the Department of Physics and Electronics through a promotions in Adekunle Ajasin University Akungba-Akoko.

== Research ==
Ajayi's primary His primary research interest is in Radiation Dosimetry, Radioecology and Radiation Transport. and he has published academic journals globally.

Ajayi has coauthored/authored at least 50 articles in referenced scholarly journals with 5 books, and more than 20 other publications.

== Appointments and service ==
Due to his kind of personality, Ajayi has indulged in various services of interests, he has received some appointments. One of which he served as External Examiner to the Federal University of Technology, Akure and the Ladoke Akintola University of Technology, Ogbomoso. He was also appointed as a Regular Associate of the UNESCO International Centre for Theoretical Physics, Trieste, Italy in 2006 and then served as Visiting Research Scientist to the Centre from 2006 -2013. He was also a visiting Research Professor at the Institute of Environmental Physics, University of Bremen, Germany between 2005 and 2007 to add to the list. Professor Ajayi is the ex Coordinator of the National Space Research and Development Agency (NARSDA) in which he funded research projects in Adekunle Ajasin University, Akungba - Akoko. Ajayi has also served on the NUC accreditation panel to university programmes.
