= Joshua Olalekan Ogunwole =

Nigerian scientist

MSSSN Joshua Olalekan Ogunwole

Vice-chancellor, Bowen University
- In office 1st of August, 2018. – 31st July, 2023
- Preceded by: Professor Matthews Ojo
- Succeeded by: Professor Jonathan O. Babalola

Personal details
- Born: 23 July 1967 (age 59) Ibadan
- Education: Ahmadu Bello University
- Occupation: Lecturer, Researcher.
- Profession: Soil Science

Joshua Ogunwole was born in Ibadan on 23 July 1967. He is a Nigerian soil scientist who currently serves as the fifth substantive vice-chancellor of Federal University Oye-Ekiti (FUOYE). He had previously served in the same role as the fourth substantive Vice-Chancellor of Bowen University.

== Education and career ==
Ogunwole has his first, second and third degree from Ahmadu Bello University, Zaria. Between the years 1990 - 1992, he served as manager of Yula farm, Kaduna.

Ogunwole taught in the department of Crop Production and Protection, Federal University, Dutsin-Ma between Dec 2013 - Mar 2016, and served as Director of the University Advancement and Linkages.

He is a Professor of Soil Physics, Department of Soil Science & Land Resource Management, Federal University Oye-Ekiti, until his appointment as a Vice-Chancellor of Bowen University.

== Networks and awards ==
In 2004, Joshua Ogunwole received research merit award for sustainable agriculture, from the Schweisfurth foundation and support Africa international of Germany.

In 2012, at Ahmadu Bello University Zaria, he successfully organized an International Workshop on Soil Physical Processes in West Africa.

Ogunwole was admitted to the College of Research Associates of the United Nations University – Institute for Natural Resources for Africa in 2015. He is a member of soil science society Nigeria.

== Projects ==
Projects include:

- Tracking the fate of pulse-labeled carbon and nitrogen in Pearl Millet residues, freshly incorporated, into soils
- Evaluation of Maize-Desmodium-Soybean Cropping Effect on Soil Quality and Crop Yields in an Alfisols of Northern Guinea Savanna, Nigeria (which he researched with other six professors).
- He is also one of the eight collaborators on the research project titled Soil properties Characterisation.

== Research papers and articles ==
Joshua Ogunwole had written over 60 research paper and article, notable among them are:

- contribution of Jatropha curcas to soil quality improvement in a degraded Indian entisol.
- Soil organic carbon, nitrogen and phosphorus distribution in stable aggregate of an Ultisol under contrasting land use and management history.
