= Muhammad Abdulazeez (academic) =

Nigerian Professor of Physics and VC

Muhammed Abdulazeez

Vice-Chancellor of Abubakar Tafawa Balewa University
- In office 26 April 2019 – 26 April 2024

Personal details
- Born: Muhammed A. Abdulazeez
- Profession: Academic

Muhammed Ahmad Abdulazeez is a professor of physics and the former Deputy Vice-Chancellor and the Vice-Chancellor of Abubakar Tafawa Balewa University between 2019 and 2024.

== Career ==
Mohammed is a professor of physics and the former Deputy Vice-Chancellor, Administrative of Abubakar Tafawa Balewa University. In 2019, he was appointed the Vice-Chancellor of the school at the 26th Council meeting of the joint selection and Senate board for a tenure of 5 years. Following the end of his tenure in 2024, Sani Usman Kunya is elected as the Acting Vice-Chancellor pending the election of a new VC for the academic session, 2025.

Mohammed is an innovative leader who has proposed different projects to the school community such as the creation of office of Deputy Vice-Chancellor for Research and the need for drug tests for staffs and students.

== Projects commissioned ==
In 2020, he commissioned 4 TETFUND projects including Central Laboratory Block, College of Medicine (Phase II) located at Gubi Campus, Clinical Complex at ATBU Teaching Hospital and building of the Center for Science, Technology, Entrepreneurship Development.
