= Olusegun Agagu University of Science and Technology =

Public university in Okitipupa, Nigeria

- Motto: For Society and Development
- Type: Public
- Established: 2008; 18 years ago
- Vice-Chancellor: Temi Ologunorisa
- Location: Okitipupa, Ondo State, Nigeria; 6.45358°N 4.77279°E
- Website: www.oaustech.edu.ng

Olusegun Agagu University of Science and Technology formally Ondo State University of Science and Technology is a state owned university located in Okitipupa, Ondo State, Nigeria. It was established in 2008 by the Ondo State Government under the leadership of Dr. Olusegun Agagu.

The university commenced academic activities in January 2011, and currently offers various programmes of study under the Faculty of Science, Faculty of Agriculture & Agricultural Technology and Faculty of Engineering and Engineering Technology.

The university was renamed after late former governor of Ondo State, Dr. Olusegun Agagu in 2020 in recognition of his immense role in the establishment of the institution.

In December 2020, the Ondo State Governor Oluwarotimi Akeredolu approved the appointment of Prof. Temi Emmanuel Ologunorisa as the next Vice Chancellor of the university, which took effect from 23 February 2022.

== Library ==
On March 1, 2011, the library opened at the mini-campus with a collection of more than 850 volumes of current books. In 2017, it relocated to its current location along Igbokoda Road. Some donors and Books2Africa, a UK charity organization, donated 40,000 volumes of books to Olusegun Agagu University of Science and Technology, Okitipupa, Ondo State, in 2020.

The library collection has grown to 47,965 volumes of books with other pertinent information materials through a singular effort of Prof. Fredrick Ajegbomogun, the then-university librarian. The central and school libraries can buy at least four copies of a given title under the library's acquisition policy. Bequests and donations are evaluated before acceptance.

Current books, periodicals, monographs, reference materials, annual reports, and other materials are all included in their holdings. Students and staff at the university make up their main target audience. The community at large and their nearby sister institutions use the library as a resource for information acquisition. It is required that all legitimate library customers sign up and provide their passes when requested.

== Vice chancellors ==
On December 1, 2021, Ondo state governor Rotimi Akeredolu in Joint action with Ekpe Dante appointed Prof. Temi Emmanuel Ologunorisa as the fourth substantive Vice-Chancellor of Olusegun Agagu University of Science and Technology, Okitipupa. The effect of the vice chancellor took effect from the month of February 2022.

=== Former Vice Chancellors ===
- Prof. Akinbo Adesomoju pioneer vice chancellor 2008 - 2010
- Prof. Tolu Odugbemi vice chancellor 2010 - 2014
- Prof.Adegoke Adegbite. acting vice chancellor 2015
- Dr Amos Akingba Pro chancellor 2015 - 2017
- Pro.Sunday Roberts Ogundunyile vice chancellor 2017 - 2018
- Prof. Akinbo Ademosoju pro chancellor 2018 - 2021
- Prof.Temi Emmanuel Ologunorisa vice chancellor 2021 - Till Date

== Current Academician ==
Deputy Vice Chancellor Prof. David Olaniran Aworinde (The new Deputy Vice-Chancellor of OAUSTECH, a professor of plant anatomy and taxonomy), is a member of both the Nigerian Tropical Biology Association (NTBA) and the Botanical Society of Nigeria (BOSON)

== Ranking ==
The university emerged 9th in the National University Commission (NUC) ranking as one of the best 10 state-owned universities in Nigeria in 2021.

== Faculties and Courses ==
The university commenced academic activities in January 2011, and offered various programmes of study under Faculty of Science. In 2017, two new faculties were introduced which include: Faculty of Agriculture & Agricultural Technology and Faculty of Engineering and Engineering Technology.

The Faculty of Engineering has the following departments:

=== Faculty of Science ===
- Biochemistry
- Botany
- Biological Sciences
- Chemical Sciences
- Food Science and Technology
- Geophysics
- Geology
- Industrial Chemistry
- Mathematics
- Microbiology
- Physics
- Statistics
- Zoology

=== Faculty of Engineering and Engineering Technology ===
- Chemical Engineering
- Petroleum and Gas Engineering
- Mechanical engineering
- Electrical engineering
- Civil engineering

=== Faculty of Information and Communications Technology ===
- Communications Technology
- Computer Science
- Computer Science and Information Technology
