= Federal University, Birnin Kebbi =

Federal university in Kebbi, Nigeria

- Type: Public
- Established: 2013; 13 years ago
- Vice-Chancellor: Professor Prof. Muhammad Zaiyan-Umar
- Location: Birnin Kebbi, Kebbi State, Nigeria
- Campus: Urban
- Website: Official website

Federal University, Birnin Kebbi is a university based in Birnin Kebbi, Kebbi State, Nigeria. It was established on 18 February 2013, alongside Gusau and Gashua by the Federal Republic of Nigeria under the leadership of President Goodluck Ebele Jonathan, GCFR, in line with the policy of the Government for establishing a Federal University in each of the states that did not have one across the federation.

== Staff ==
Mr. Abubakar Aliyu is a Registrar of Federal University, Birnin Kebbi who receives all the university admission inquiries. The Vice-Chancellor of the university is Professor Muhammad Umar.

== History ==
The University was established in 2013 by the federal government of Nigeria. Professor Lawal Suleiman Bilbis, FNSMB, a Professor of Biochemistry and former Deputy Vice-Chancellor Academic at Usmanu Danfodiyo University Sokoto was appointed as the pioneer Vice Chancellor of the University while Ibrahim Abubakar Mungadi, FCAI, was appointed as the Registrar.

Academic activities began in November 2014, for the 2014/2015 academic session with a students’ population of 507 and academic staff strength of 102. Accordingly, maiden and second matriculation took place on 5 March 2015, and 9 February 2016, with a total of 507 and 972 Undergraduate sworn in, respectively.

The University currently has three faculties and a College of Health Sciences and offer a total of twenty-four (24) degree programmes. The University has six (6) directorates which include, Academic Planning, Physical Planning, Research and Innovation, ICT Directorate, Entrepreneurship and CSBE Directorate. The University just recently toward the ends of the year 2017 had the substantive leadership, where the federal government approved the appointment of Prof. Bello Bala Shehu as the new university vice-chancellor; Prof. B.B Shehu is a Medical Practitioner of neural science, he was also the former Chief Medical Director of the National Hospital, Abuja.

The university is maintaining two sites, the takeoff site and the permanent site, the takeoff site maintains the School for Basic and Remedial Studies and Females Hostels at Kalgo; whereas, the permanent site maintains the major campus capacity buildings at Unguwar Jeji (a village 4 kilometers away from the takeoff site.)

== University facilities ==
The university has the following facilities:

- University Library
- University Sport Facilities/Activities
- University Housing

== University services ==
The university provides the following services:

- Financial Aid
- Study Abroad
- Distance Learning
- Academic Counselling
- Career Services

== Library ==
The university library is established to support the academic activities of the university through the acquisition and organization of information resources such as books, periodicals, online and offline data bases. the current university Librarian is called Sabiu Lawal and the library used Library integrated management system that ease all the job of the librarians and make information retrievals easy.

== Faculties ==
The University currently operates six (6) faculties.

Arts	Management Science	Social Science
1. History & International Relations	1. Accounting; 2. Business Administration	1. Economics; 2. Geography; 3. Political Science; 4. Sociology; 5. Demography & Social Statistics
Sciences	Environmental Science	College of Health Science
1. Applied Geophysics; 2. Biochemistry & molecular Biology; 3. Biology; 4. Computer Science; 5. Mathematics; 6. Pure & Industrial Chemistry; 7. Microbiology; Botany& zoology: 1. Physics with Electronics	1. Architecture; 2. Building Technology; 3. Quantity Surveying	1. Nursing Sciences; 2. Anatomy; 3. Medicine and Surgery; 4. Physiology

== Facultys ==
- Faculty of Arts
- Faculty of Management Science
- Faculty of Social Science
- Depa
- Faculty of Architecture
- Medicine and surgery MBBS
- Pharmacy
- Nursing

== University location ==
The University is located along Kalgo-Bunza Road; PMB 1157 Birnin Kebbi Nigeria.

== See also ==
- List of universities in Nigeria
- Education in Nigeria
