= Federal University, Gusau =

University in Nigeria

Federal University Gusau
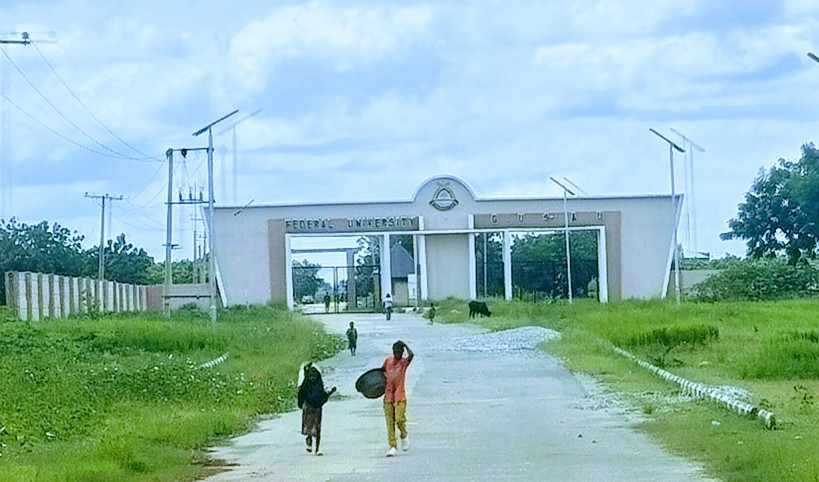
- Type: Public University
- Established: 2013
- Chancellor: Emir of Anka (current ceremonial chancellor)
- Vice-Chancellor: Prof. Tukur Adamu
- Location: Gusau, Zamfara State, Nigeria
- Campus: Permanent site along Gusau–Zaria Road
- Colours: Blue and White
- Nickname: FUGUS
- Website: fugusau.edu.ng

Federal University Gusau, also known by the acronym FUGUS, located in Gusau Zamfara State, Nigeria was one of the last 6 proposed new universities in 2010.

The implementation of the first phase of the proposal started in February, 2011, with the establishment of nine Universities, while the second phase involving the remaining three universities including Federal University Gusau was established in 2013, during the presidency of Goodluck Jonathan. with three faculties, Humanities and Education, Management and Social Science, and Science.

== Library ==
The Library was established in 2014 but started operations in September, 2015 when academic activities started in the university. It was initially located in a block of classroom with few shelves and reading tables that can accommodate 50 readers at a time. The initial collection was 350,000 volumes of books and journals donated by John Allen & Allen. The Library was then headed by an experienced professional Chief Library Officer in the person of Mal. Dantani Ruwa Ambursa who came from Usmanu Danfodiyo University Library, Sokoto. The Library got a large number of books and journals from Emeka Offor Foundation, Gusau Institute and some personalities in the society. It also started enjoying the TETFund Library Intervention starting with 2016 & 2017, respectively. With this development, the number of books and journals increased astronomically to about 298,000 volumes . The main library is located in multipurpose hall beside the faculty of humanity and education which is serving four faculties with seventeen departments. The E- library section has both online and offline databases which:

- EBSCOHOST
- HINARI
- AGORA
- OARE
- CALIBRE (offline)

Library Services

- Circulation services
- loan services
- Photocopying
- User guide education
- Reference service
- Internet Search services

== Faculties and Departments ==
S/N	Faculty	Department
1.	Humanities	1. Arabic and Islamic Studies; 2. English and Literature; 3. History and International Studies; 4. Languages and Culture
2.	Education	1. Educational Foundation; 2. Science Education
3.	Science	1. Biological Sciences; 2. Geological Sciences; 3. Mathematics; 4. Physics; 5. Computer Science
4.	Management and Social Sciences	1. Accounting/Finance; 2. Business Administration; 3. Economics; 4. Public Administration; 5. Political Science; 6. Sociology

== 2023 Kidnapping ==
On 22 September 2023, 24 students, 10 workers and one security guard were kidnapped from the university by gunmen.

== See also ==
- List of universities in Nigeria
- Education in Nigeria
