= List of Nigerian entrepreneurs =

Notable Nigerian entrepreneurs, businesspeople of Nigerian nationality or with Nigerian citizenship.

- Sowemimo Abiodun
- M. K. O. Abiola
- Mike Adenuga — Founder, GLOBACOM
- Taiwo Afolabi
- Dangote
- Femi Otedola
- Mahmood Ahmadu
- Ayobami Akindipe
- Chiamaka Aniakor
- Ganiyu Akanbi Bello
- Demola Aladekomo
- Folorunsho Alakija
- Rommel Asagwara
- Chief E.O. Ashamu
- Tonye Briggs-Oniyide
- Tonye Cole – co-founder of Sahara Group
- Mfon Ekpo
- Aliko Dangote – Chairman, Dangote Group
- Theophilus Danjuma
- Shafi Edu
- Mr Eazi – Singer, songwriter, and entrepreneur
- Francis Edo-Osagie
- Tony Elumelu — Founder, Tony Elumelu Foundation
- Thomas Etuh
- Morenike Molehin
- Godwin Maduka, Founder of Las Vegas Pain Institute and Medical Center
- Chin Okeke
- Orondaam Otto — Founder, Slum2School Africa
- Adesua Etomi
- Samuel Fawehinmi
- Veekee James
- Cletus Ibeto
- Michael Ibru
- Linda Ikeji — Founder, Lindaikejiblog
- Mohammed Indimi
- Anastasios George Leventis
- Dele Momodu – CEO and publisher, Ovation International
- Ben Murray-Bruce – Chairman and Founder, The Silverbird Group
- Joseph James Nantomah
- Jason Njoku – CEO, irokotv
- Genevieve Nnaji
- Ndidi Nnoli-Edozien (born 1972), social entrepreneur
- Chidi Nwaogu
- Mary Nzimiro (1898–1993), businesswoman, politician and women's activist
- Sunny Obazu-Ojeagbase
- Uche Pedro founder and CEO, BellaNaija
- Johnel Nnamani — co-founder, Nnamani Music Group
- Nnamani Grace Odi — co-founder, Nnamani Music Group
- Louis Odumegwu Ojukwu
- Adeola Odutola
- Stella Chinyelu Okoli
- Festus Okotie-Eboh
- Omu Okwei
- Lawrence Omole
- C. T. Onyekwelu
- Samuel Olatunbosun Shonibare
- Seun Osewa
- Bisoye Tejuoso
- Bamanga Tukur
- Ade Tuyo
- Femi Otedola
- Jim Ovia — Founder, Zenith Bank
- Oba Otudeko
- Abdul Samad Rabiu
- Seun Osewa
- Uzoma Dozie
- Funke Opeke
- Dahiru Mangal
- Iyinoluwa Aboyeji
- Don Jazzy — Founder, Marvin Records
- Tejumola Maurice-Diya
- Mathias Ugochukwu
- Daere Akobo – Chairman, PANA Holdings
- BDGX – Founder, Doingx Records, TYO Realtors
- Ugi Augustine Ugi -- Founder, Nugi Group
