= Tejumola =

Nigerian given name

- Gender: Unisex
- Language: Yoruba

Origin
- Origin: Nigerian
- Meaning: "Stare at wealth"
- Region of origin: South-west Nigeria

TejumolaTejumola is a Nigerian given name of Yoruba origin, primarily feminine but used for both genders. The name is made up of the Yoruba words "tẹ" (press), "ojú" (eyes or face), "mọ́" (onto), and "ọlá" (wealth), translating to "stare at wealth." Morphologically, it is written as tẹ-ojú-mọ́-ọlá.

== Notable people with the name ==
- Tejumola Olaniyan (1959 - 2019) Nigerian academic.
- Busola Tejumola – Nigerian media executive.
- Tejumola Maurice-Diya – Nigerian fashion designer
