= Nnadi =

Nnadi is a surname. Notable people with the surname include:

- Chioma Nnadi (born 1980 or 1981), British fashion editor
- Derrick Nnadi (born 1996), American football player
- Iheoma Nnadi (born 1995), Nigerian beauty pageant titleholder
- Tochukwu Nnadi (born 2003), Nigerian footballer

== See also ==
- Nnamdi
