= Nnamani =

- Gender: Male
- Language: Igbo

Origin
- Origin: Igbo
- Meaning: my father’s land or my father’s heritage
- Region of origin: Igboland

Nnamani// is an Igbo name and surname with origins from Igboland. “Nnam” means “my father” while “ani” means “land” or “heritage”. The name is fully translated in English to mean “my father’s land” or “my father’s heritage”.

== Notable people with the surname ==
- Augustine Nnamani, former justice of the Supreme Court of Nigeria
- Chimaroke Nnamani (born 1960), Nigerian politician and doctor
- Emeka Nnamani (footballer) (born 2001), Danish footballer
- Emeka Nnamani (politician), Nigerian businessman and politician
- Johnel Nnamani, Nigerian entrepreneur
- Johnson Nnamani, Nigerian athlete
- Nnamani Grace Odi (born 2001), Nigerian writer and entrepreneur
- Ken Nnamani (born 1948), Nigerian politician
- Ogonna Nnamani (born 1983), American volleyball player
- Samuel Nnamani (born 1995), Nigerian footballer
