= Trinidadian and Tobagonian Canadians =

Canadians of Trinidadian and Tobagonian birth or descent

Trinidadian and Tobagonian Canadians Trinidadiano y Tobagoniano Canadienses Trinidadien et Tobagonien Canadiens
Total population
- 105,966 (by ancestry, 2021 Census); 70,035 (by birth, 2021 Census)

Regions with significant populations
- Ontario: 69,560
- Quebec: 8,585
- Alberta: 7,180
- British Columbia: 6,170
- Manitoba: 3,400

Trinidadian and Tobagonian Canadians are Canadian citizens who are fully or partially of Trinidadian and Tobagonian descent or people born in Trinidad and Tobago. There were 105,965 Trinidadian and Tobagonian Canadians in 2021, with the majority of them living in Toronto, Peel Region (Mississauga and Brampton), and Durham Region (Pickering, Ajax, Whitby and Oshawa).

== History ==
Trinidadians and Tobagonians first to immigrate to the country in substantial numbers during the 1920s, when several hundred individuals arrived to work in the mines of Nova Scotia, the shipyards of Collingwood, Ontario, and Halifax, Nova Scotia, as well as serving as personal attendants in the East.

== Demographics ==
Population by ancestry by Canadian province or territory (2016)
Province	Population	Source
Ontario	59,560	
Quebec	6,585	
Alberta	5,180	
British Columbia	4,170	
Manitoba	2,400	
Saskatchewan	415	
Nova Scotia	325	
New Brunswick	145	
Newfoundland and Labrador	95	
Northwest Territories	25	
Prince Edward Island	25	
Yukon	20	
Nunavut	10	
Canada	78,965	

== Notable Trinidadian and Tobagonian Canadians ==
=== Activists ===
- Nicholas Marcus Thompson, activist
- Charles Roach, lawyer and co-founder of the Black Action Defence Committee

=== Athletes and sportspeople ===
- Stephen Ames, PGA golfer
- Ian Beckles, football player
- Sydney Boisselle, soccer player
- Josh Byrne, lacrosse player
- Andre De Grasse, sprinter
- Marisa Dick, gymnast
- Sam Gellard, ice hockey player, (WHA)
- Glenroy Gilbert, sprinter
- Gary Goodridge, kickboxer and mixed martial artist
- Stephen Hart, retired soccer player and current coach, former head coach of the Canada and Trinidad and Tobago men's national teams
- Joey Haywood, streetballer
- Atiba Hutchinson, soccer player
- Cory Joseph, basketball player
- Devoe Joseph, basketball player
- Kris Joseph, basketball player
- Maurice Joseph, basketball coach
- Arin King, soccer player
- Jamaal Magloire, retired basketball player and current coach
- Kenndal McArdle, ice hockey player
- Andrew McNeilly, bobsledder
- Naz Mitrou-Long, basketball player
- Darnell Nurse, ice hockey player, Edmonton Oilers
- Kia Nurse, basketball player and analyst
- Richard Nurse, football player
- Sarah Nurse, ice hockey player
- Greg Ranjitsingh, soccer player
- Jillian Richardson, track and field athlete
- Randy Samuel, soccer player, represented Canada at the 1986 FIFA World Cup
- O. J. Santiago, football player
- Adrian Serioux, soccer player
- Luke Singh, soccer player
- Dayne St. Clair, soccer player
- Ryan Telfer, soccer player
- Rick Titus, soccer player
- Nigel Wilson, baseball player, Florida Marlins, Cincinnati Reds

=== Media, film and television ===
- Brandon Ash-Mohammed, comedian
- Sean Cheesman, dancer, choreographer, and television personality
- Antonio Michael Downing, broadcaster, writer and musician
- Lateesha Ector, beauty queen and model
- Farley Flex, music promoter, motivational speaker, and television personality
- LaToya Forever, YouTube personality
- Richard Fung, video artist and filmmaker
- Ian Harnarine, filmmaker
- Ian Hanomansing, broadcast journalist
- Nissae Isen, voice actress
- Tajja Isen, voice actress
- Selwyn Jacob, filmmaker and producer
- Clark Johnson, actor and director
- Taborah Johnson, actress and singer
- Dean Marshall, actor
- Brandon Jay McLaren, actor
- Nathan Mitchell, actor
- Omari Newton, actor
- Shailyn Pierre-Dixon, actress
- Claire Prieto, filmmaker and producer
- RT!, music video director
- Frances-Anne Solomon, filmmaker and producer
- Director X, music video director

=== Musicians ===
- Keshia Chanté, R&B and pop singer
- Trinisha Browne, recording artist
- Anslem Douglas, musician and composer
- Drew Gonsalves, singer-songwriter
- Molly Johnson, singer-songwriter
- Glenn Lewis, R&B singer
- Amanda Marshall, pop singer
- Tre Mission, rapper and producer
- Graph Nobel, singer-songwriter and rapper
- k-os, rapper, producer, and singer
- PartyNextDoor, singer, rapper, and producer
- Serena Ryder, singer-songwriter
- David Rudder, calypsonian

=== Politicians ===
- Bas Balkissoon, MPP for Scarborough—Rouge River
- Bernadette Clement, Mayor of Cornwall, Ontario
- Hedy Fry, MP for Vancouver Centre
- Marci Ien, MP for Toronto Centre, former broadcast journalist
- Belinda Karahalios, MPP for Cambridge
- Ceta Ramkhalawansingh, Toronto city councillor
- Christopher Skeete, MNA for Sainte-Rose

=== Writers ===
- Andre Alexis, novelist
- Neil Bissoondath, novelist and television host
- Shane Book, poet
- David Chariandy, novelist
- Ramabai Espinet, novelist and poet
- Cecil Gray, poet
- Rabindranath Maharaj, novelist
- Shani Mootoo, writer and visual artist
- Liselle Sambury, novelist
- Tasha Spillett-Sumner, graphic novelist

=== Other ===
- Stephen Blizzard, veterinarian, flight surgeon, military official, and first surgical resident at the National Defence Medical Centre
- Joe Fortes, first official lifeguard in the City of Vancouver
- Ahmad Ghany, accused terrorism suspect
- Andil Gosine, artist, curator, and scholar
- Tina Pereira, ballet dancer
- Bruce Poon Tip, entrepreneur

== See also ==
- Canada–Trinidad and Tobago relations
- Caribbean Canadians
- Arawak
- Indo-Canadians
- Chinese Canadians
- Arab Canadians
- Indigenous peoples in Canada
- Trinidadian and Tobagonian Americans
- Trinidadian and Tobagonian British
