= Federal University of Applied Sciences Kachia =

University in Kachia, Nigeria

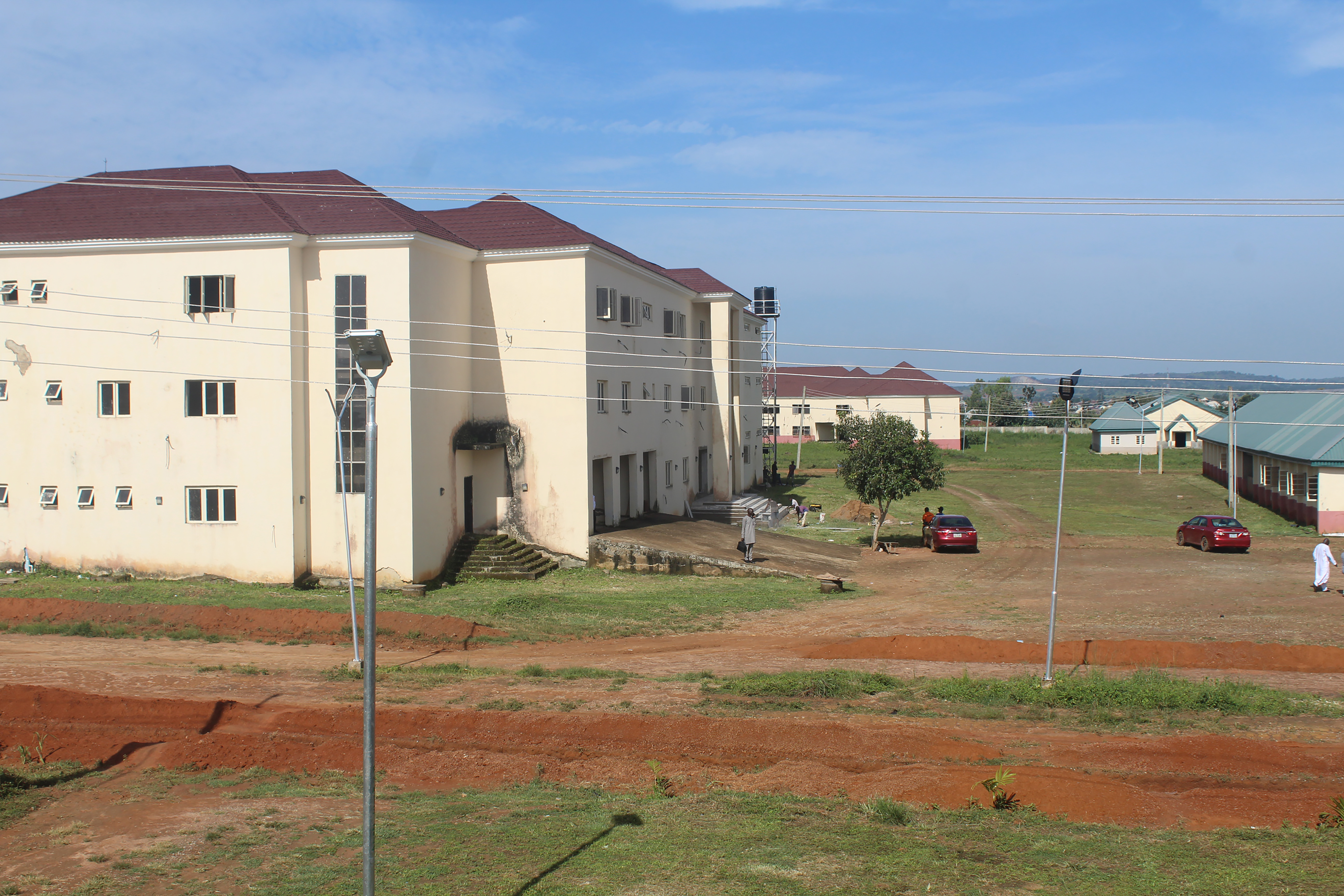
- Former name: Nok University Kachia
- Motto: Knowledge and Innovation for Development
- Type: Public
- Established: 2025
- Vice-Chancellor: William Barnabas Qurix
- Location: Kachia, southern Kaduna, Nigeria; 09°53′00″N 07°58′35″E
- Campus: Suburban
- Website: www.fuask.edu.ng

The Federal University of Applied Sciences Kachia (FUASK), is a public university in Kachia, southern Kaduna State, Nigeria. It was established in 2025 on the seized properties of Nok University (established in 2021 as the first indigenous private university in the state). The university is the first university of applied sciences in Nigeria.

== History ==
The university was first proposed in 2018 to be established as the Federal University of Science and Technology in Manchok. The bill was presented by the then-Senator representing the Kaduna South senatorial district or "Zone 3", Danjuma Laah, but did not materialize during his tenure which ended in 2023. His successor, Sunday Marshall Katung, thereafter pushed the bill further with more intensity. Vanguard Nigeria in an interview with Professor John G. Laah working with the Department of Geography, Kaduna State University (KASU), gathered that the plans had to be adjusted. According to Professor Laah, a representative of the Forum of Southern Kaduna Professors, a bill was pushed in the National Assembly to convert the Federal School of Statistics to the Federal University of Science and Technology in Manchok. However, it was not passed during the tenure of Senator Laah.

With the incoming of Senator Katung, the challenge to seek and have a federal university established within Southern Kaduna where education is the major industry, was picked by him. With many consultations across academic, traditional and political stakeholders in Southern Kaduna including the Academic Staff Union of Universities (ASUU) national body which opposed the idea of the Federal University of Science and Technology, an agreement was reached to have a Federal University of Applied Sciences without any opposition, not a Southern Kaduna University of Applied Sciences, which makes it the first of its kind in Nigeria. The proposed university was to be located in Manchok as initially planned, but it became necessary to change this plan. After further consultations, it was decided that it should be located in Kachia to avoid certain barriers related to the cost of starting a new institution.

Since Nok University already had about five established faculties before it was closed, it was necessary to reduce that cost by starting with a Kachia campus of the school. According to Professor Laah, the founder of Nok University, Anthony Hassan, was consulted as a stakeholder over the decision to convert the university, ceded to the Federal government, for the newly established institution. Kachia has a history of being one of the only two non-capital native authorities alongside Wukari, in Nigeria. It also has a tighter security and more cosmopolitan compared to Manchok, Professor Laah added. The government also had it in mind that the institution should be kickstarted in Kachia, he said. About the naming of the school, the idea of naming it "Federal University of Applied Sciences Nok" was out of point because there was a desire for the word "Nok" to be included in the name and the location of the school happens not to be in Nok village. Instead, naming it "Federal University of Applied Sciences Kachia" or "Federal University of Applied Sciences Manchok" was more appropriate, while "Nok Campus Kachia" could be created as an additional title. Also, naming it after a person at the beginning may dim the profile of the school. The team which met with the Federal government also made a submission that the school has to be located within the Southern Kaduna territory regardless of in what town which could be Kujama, Lere, or Saminaka. Earlier on as a senator, Uba Sani had proposed a bill for a university in the Kaduna Central senatorial district, but had to step it down in support of a university in Southern Kaduna after being approached by them, said Professor Laah.

Those involved in the transition from Nok University to the current institution included General Martin Luther Agwai (retired), Bishop Matthew Kukah, Justice Kumai Bayang Akaahs, and Sen. Sunday Marshall Katung. Others include: Daniel Amos, Rev. John Joseph Hayab, Anthony Hassan, Ali Kalat, Dr. Abdulmalik Durunguwa, Charity Shekari, Deborah Usman, Andrew Yakubu, and others.

Katung also expressed his gratitude to the Nigerian President, Bola Tinubu; Vice President, Kashim Shettima; Senate President, Godswill Akpabio; Governor of Kaduna State, Uba Sani, and all involved in the process.

== Vision and mission ==
=== Vision ===
To become a globally recognized institution in knowledge, skills and innovation.

=== Mission ===
To equip graduates with knowledge and skills for innovation.

== Organization ==
The university's Governing Council and Principal Officers were inaugurated on Friday, March 21, 2025. The Catholic Archbishop of the Sokoto Diocese, Bishop Matthew Kukah, was appointed the chairman of the Governing Council by the Nigerian Minister of Education, Tunji Alausa, who oversaw the inauguration. Bishop Kukah was also announced the Pro-Chancellor of the university. Professor William Barnabas Qurix was appointed Vice-Chancellor, Sanusi Adamu as registrar, Ibrahim Dalhat as bursar, and Prof. Daniel Abubakar was appointed as the university librarian. Other members of the Governing Council include: Thomas Etuh (North-central), Fabian Nwaora (South-east), Prof. Femi Taiwo (South-west), and Zarah Bukar (North-east). It was also announced that the school will commence operations with a comprehensive budgeted amount in September 2025, not only with the initial take-off grant. The Federal Medical Centre, Kafanchan (being converted from a General Hospital) will be its teaching hospital.

The Federal University of Applied Sciences Kachia sits on 270 hectares of land, which is an expansion of the 109 hectares previously owned by Nok University.

== Accreditations and certifications ==
Before the transition to the Federal University of Applied Sciences, Nok University was accredited by the Nigerian Universities Commission (NUC), which also acknowledges the transition. In March 2025, Nigerian Minister of Education, Tunji Alausa, stated that the Joint Admissions and Matriculation Board (JAMB) had been written to, to include the school in its admission portal. Meanwhile, the NUC planned a visit to the school on April 7, 2025, for resource verification. All other processes would commence with the Federal Ministry of Education, afterwards. He added that the courses to be offered by the school will include: Applied Sciences, Chemistry, Computer Science, Environmental Sciences, Medical Sciences, and Physics with Engineering courses soon to come.

== Degree programmes ==
A total of 18 majors, minors and undergraduate programmes were approved by the NUC for its kickstart with the 2025/2026 academic session. The school has a total of seven faculties.

=== Bachelor's programmes ===
==== College of Medicine ====
- BSc Anatomy
- BSc Physiology
- Medicine and Surgery (MBBS)

==== Faculty of Allied Health Sciences ====
- BSc Health Information Management (BHIM)
- BSc Medical Laboratory Science (BMLS)
- BSc Nursing Science (BScN)
- BSc Radiography

==== Faculty of Architecture ====
- BArch Architecture

==== Faculty of Computing ====
- BSc Computer Science
- BSc Cyber Security
- BSc Information Technology
- BSc Software Engineering

==== Faculty of Environmental Science ====
- BSc Environmental Resource Management
- BSc Quantity Surveying

==== Faculty of Pharmacy ====
- Doctor of Pharmacy (PharmD)

==== Faculty of Sciences ====
- BSc Biotechnology
- BSc Industrial Chemistry
- BSc Microbiology

== Security ==
General Christopher Gwabin Musa, the Nigerian Chief of Defence, gave an assurance for the provision of adequate security to the university.

== Criticism ==
The Punch Editorial Board in Nigeria, in a publication on the 7th of January 2025 titled, "New federal varsity a misnomer", stated that the priority of the Nigerian government should be on elevating existing universities in Nigeria to meet global standards instead of creating new ones. They described the establishment of the new university by the Nigerian President, Bola Tinubu, as "political" and a "Greek gift". In response to this, the Kaduna State Chapter of the Middle Belt Forum, represented by Luka Binniyat, said that despite the fact that most of the indigenous skilled and educated workforce being from Southern Kaduna, only one of the 16 federal institutions in Kaduna State is located in Southern Kaduna, which is the Federal School of Statistics Manchok. The others being located in Zaria, in the northern part of the state. He described this as a marginalization which the editorial board should be shocked to discover. The Forum of Southern Kaduna Professors (FOSKAP) spokesman, Prof. John G. Laah, also condemned the criticism by the Punch Editorial Board and added that newspapers should be responsible for exposing discriminations of all forms, especially that having to do with the access to education because every Nigerian deserves it.

== Appraisal ==
In February 2025, the Southern Kaduna People in Diaspora Europe (SOKAPDAE) through its president, Casimir Biriyok, and secretary, Dr. Janet Nake, viewed the move to establish the university as "a victory for justice, equity and fairness in the distribution of educational resources".

== Gallery ==
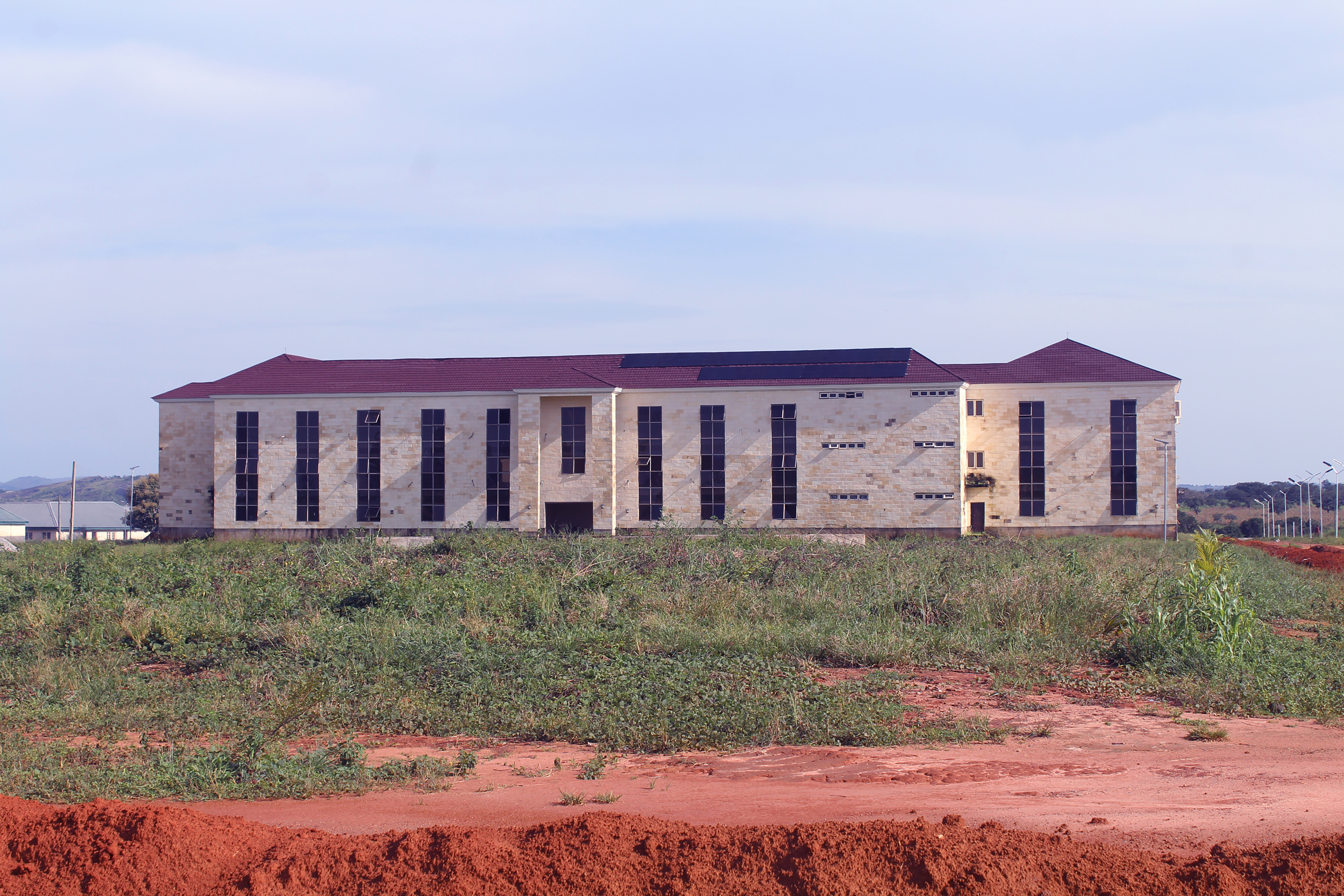
FUASK Admin block posterior

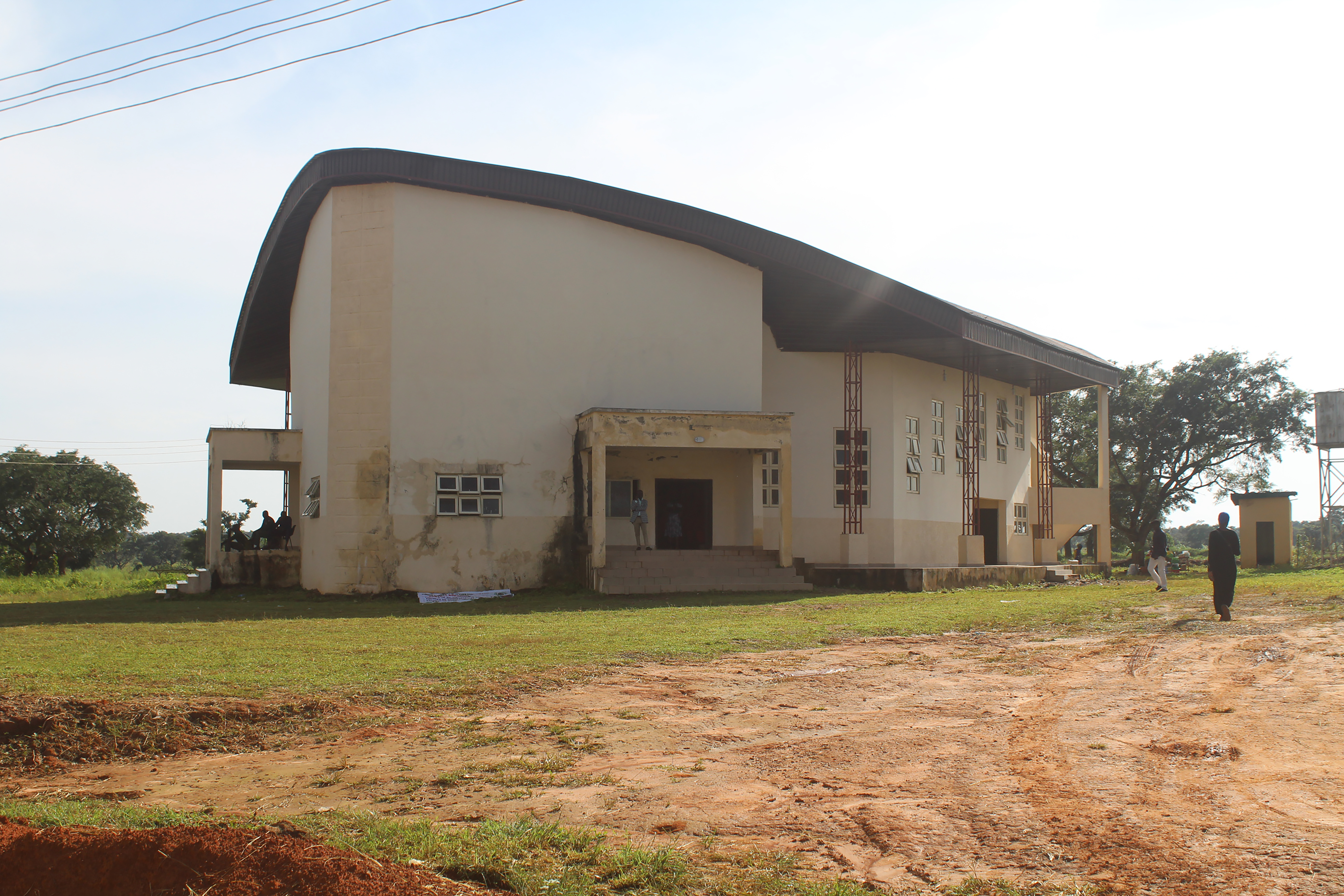
FUASK Auditorium

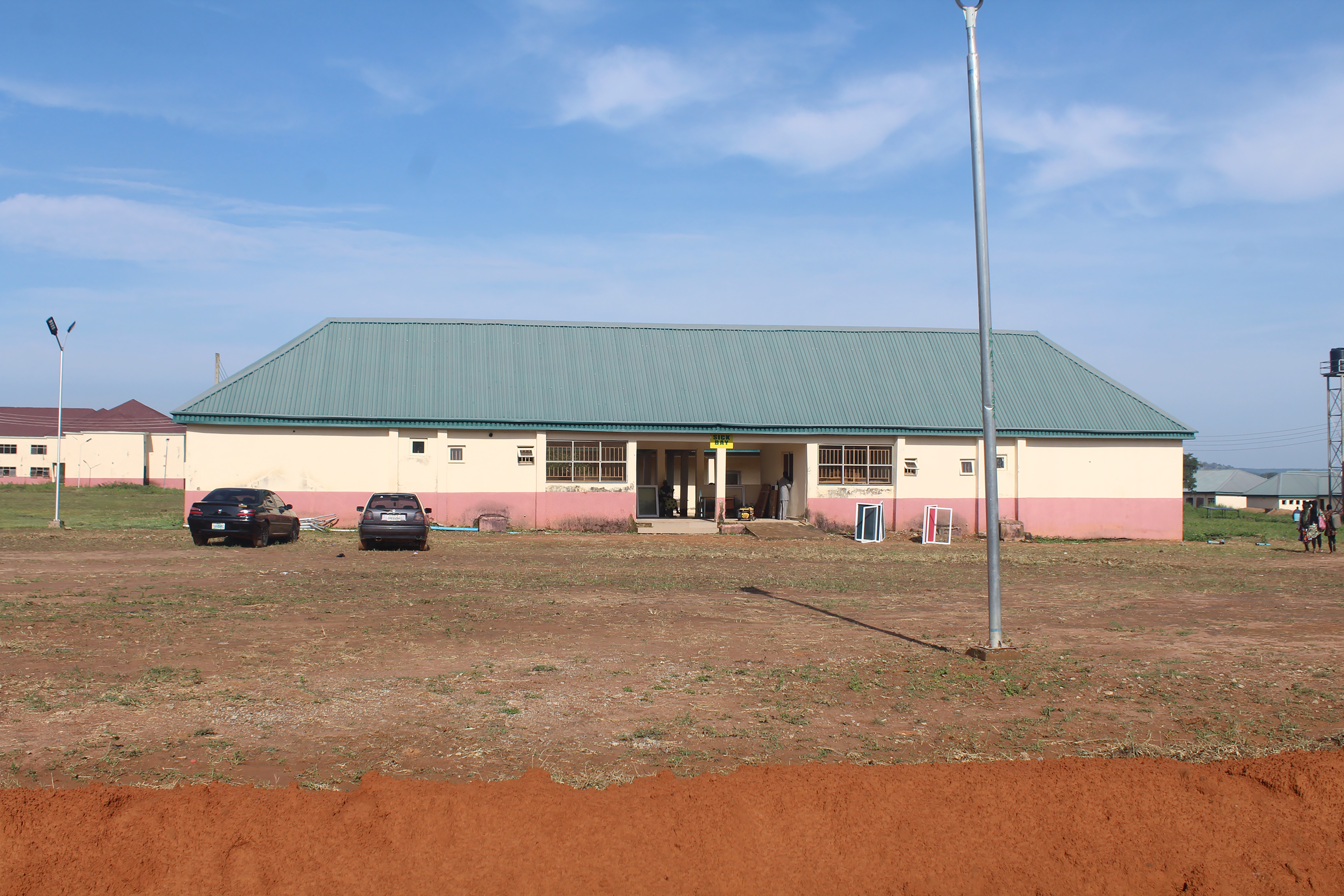
FUASK Sick bay

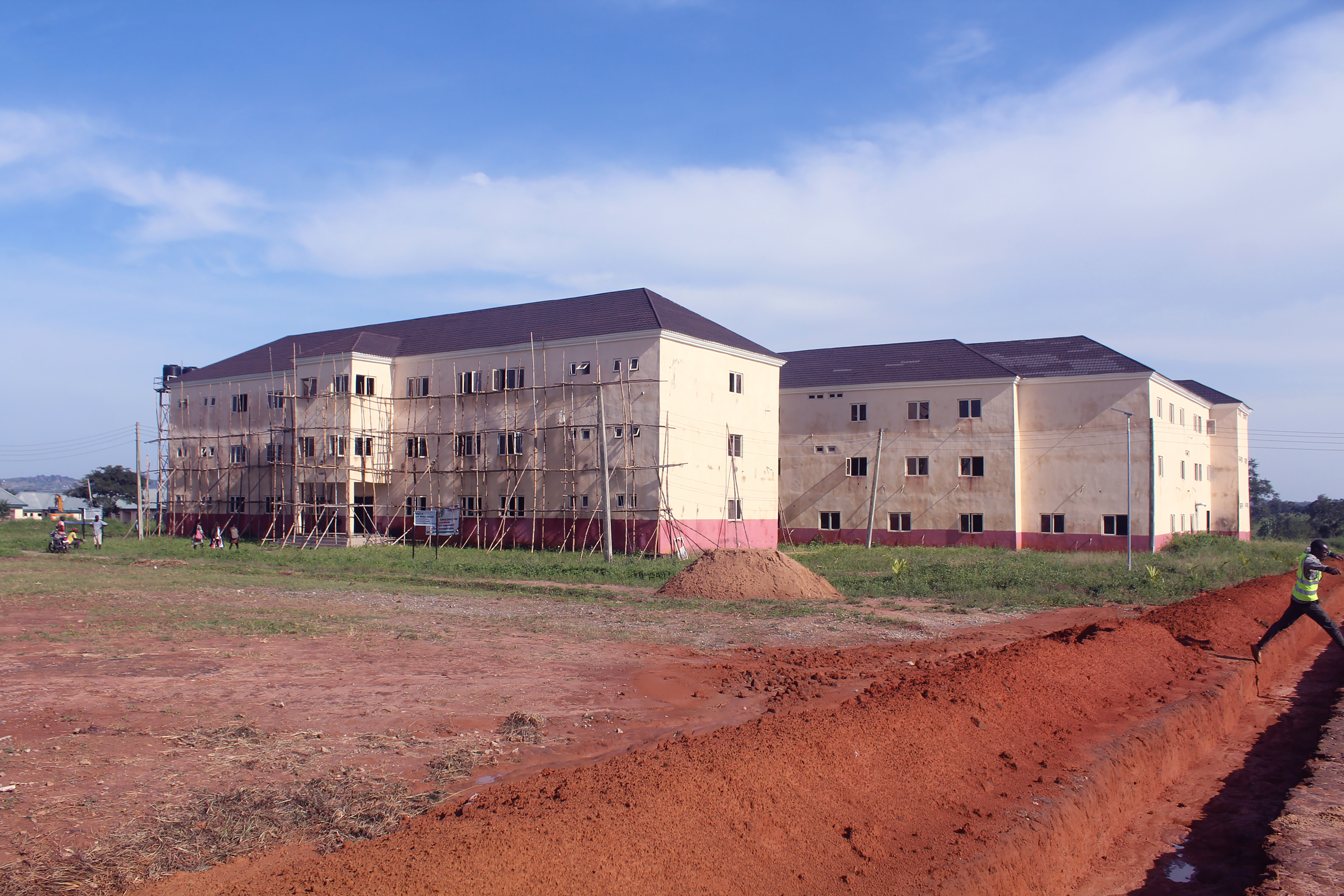
Faculty of Allied Health Sciences and Faculty of Basic Medical Sciences

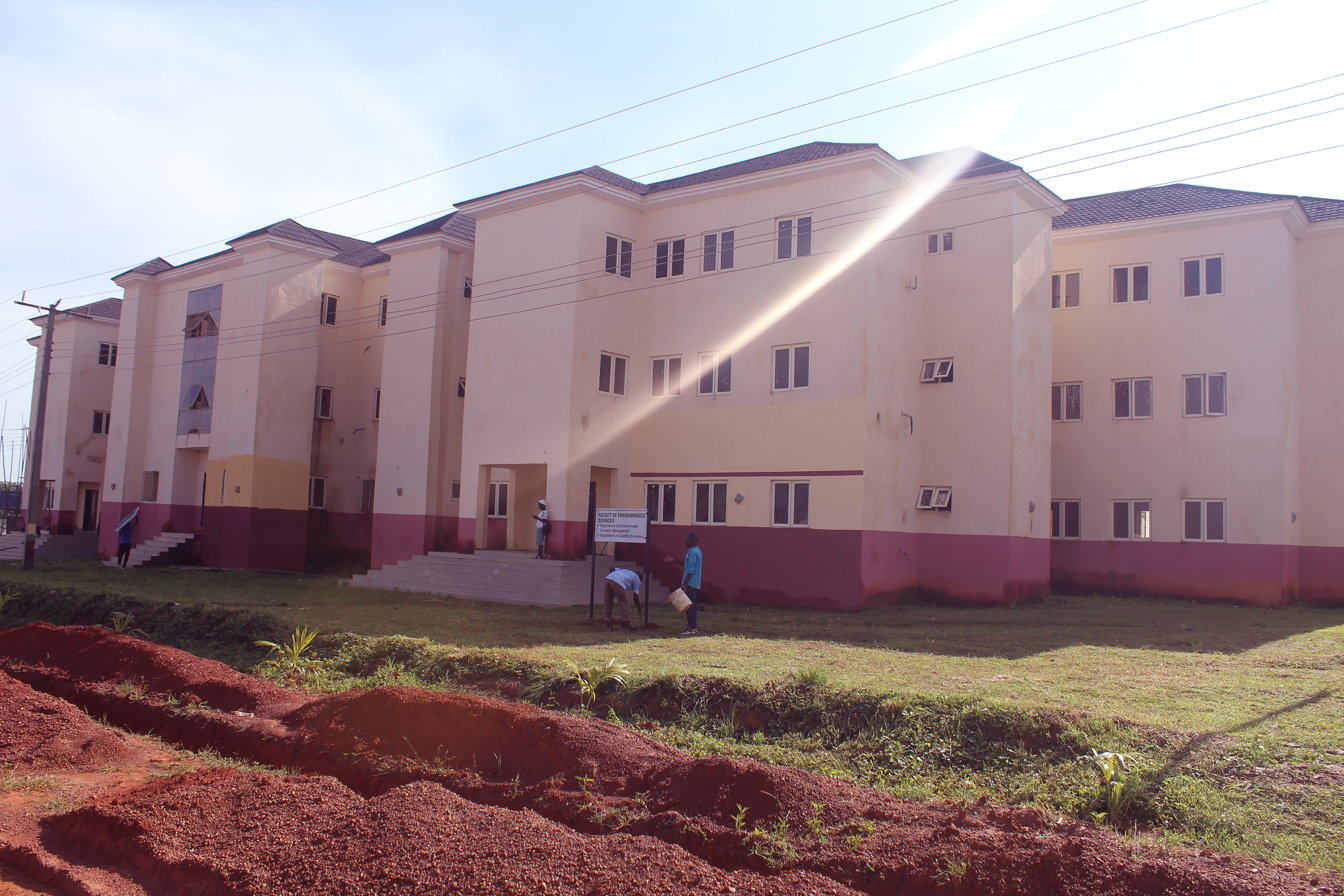
Faculty of Architecture and Faculty of Environmental Sciences

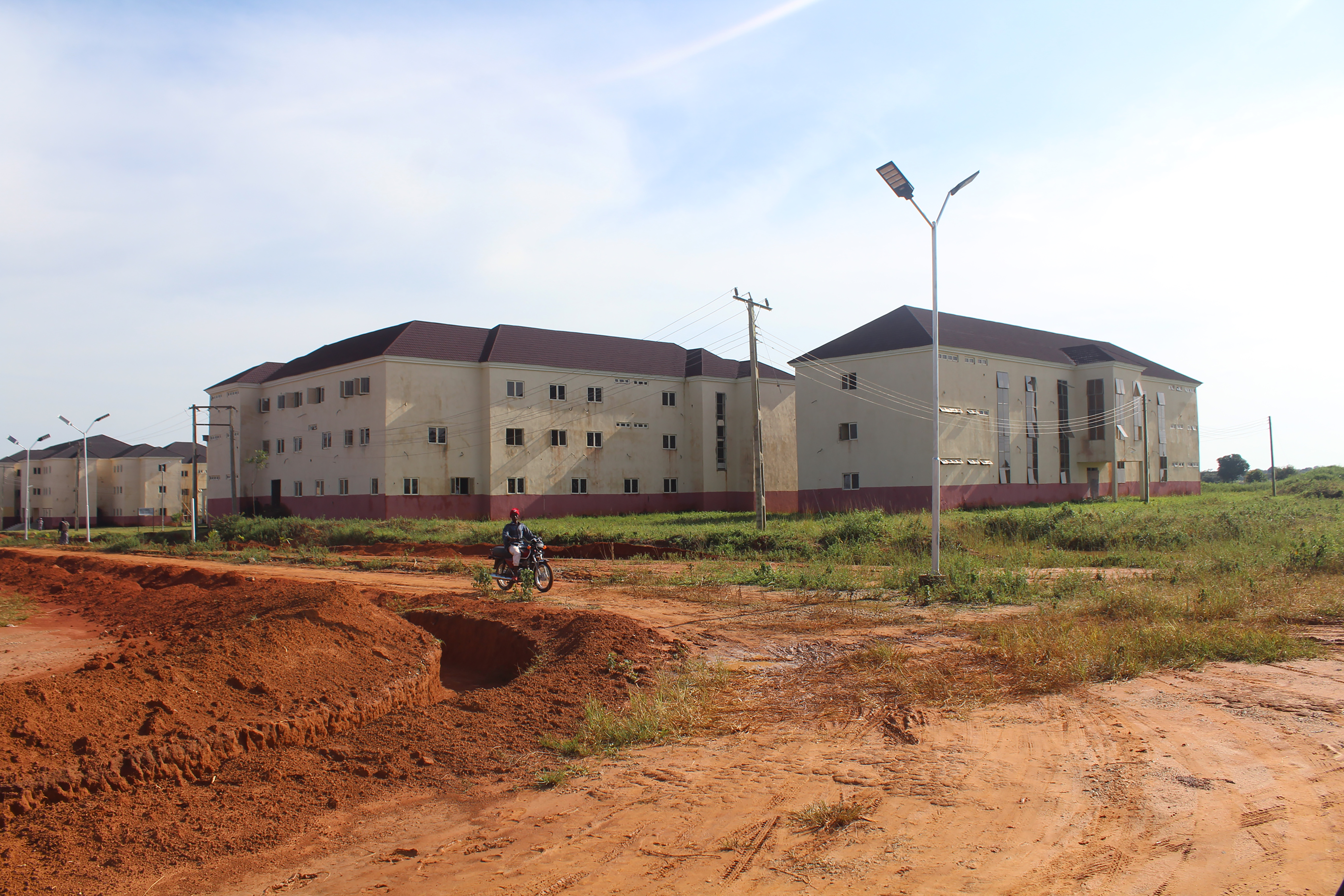
Faculty of Sciences and Faculty of Computing

Registration hall

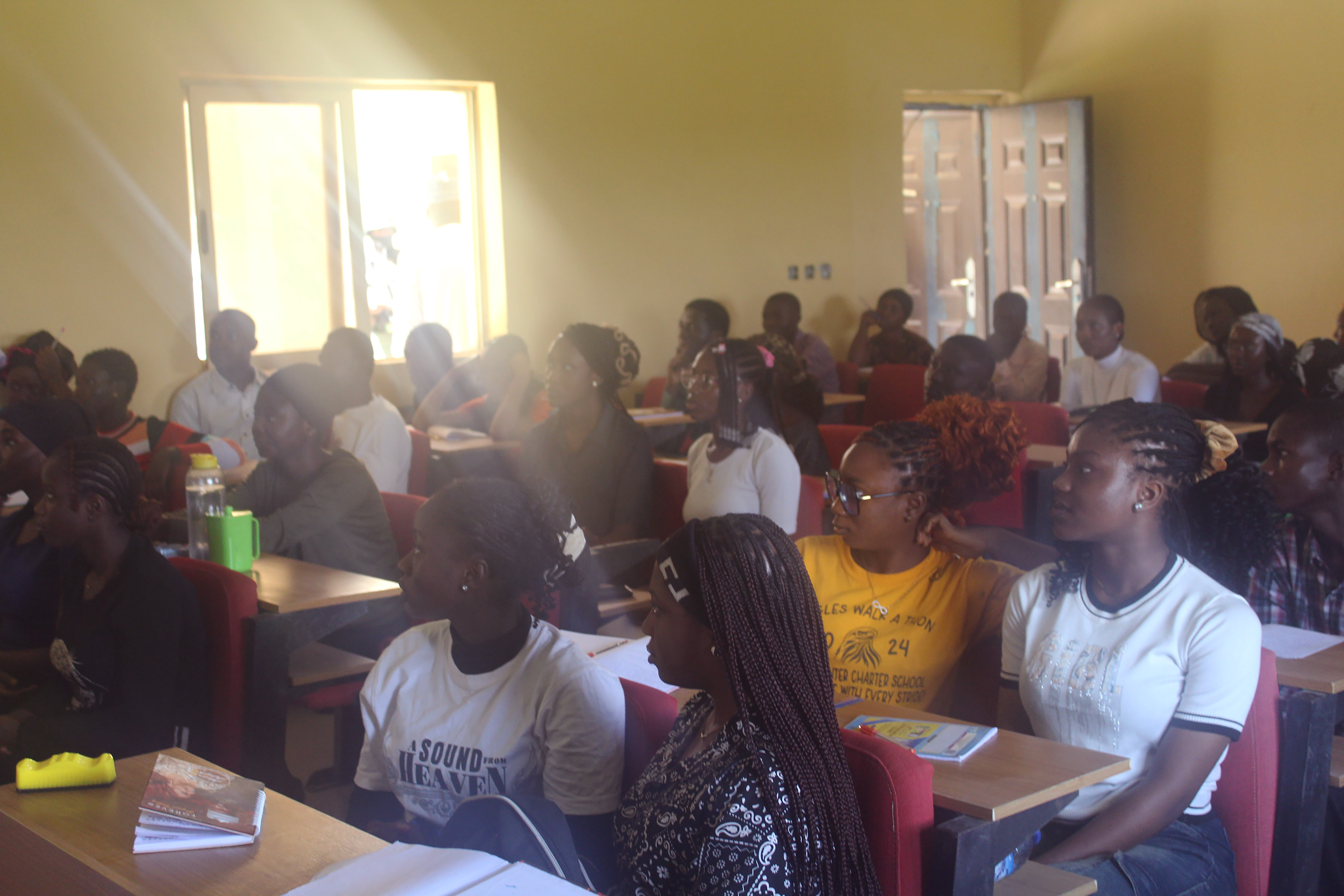
Medical students on the first day of resumption, 29 September 2025

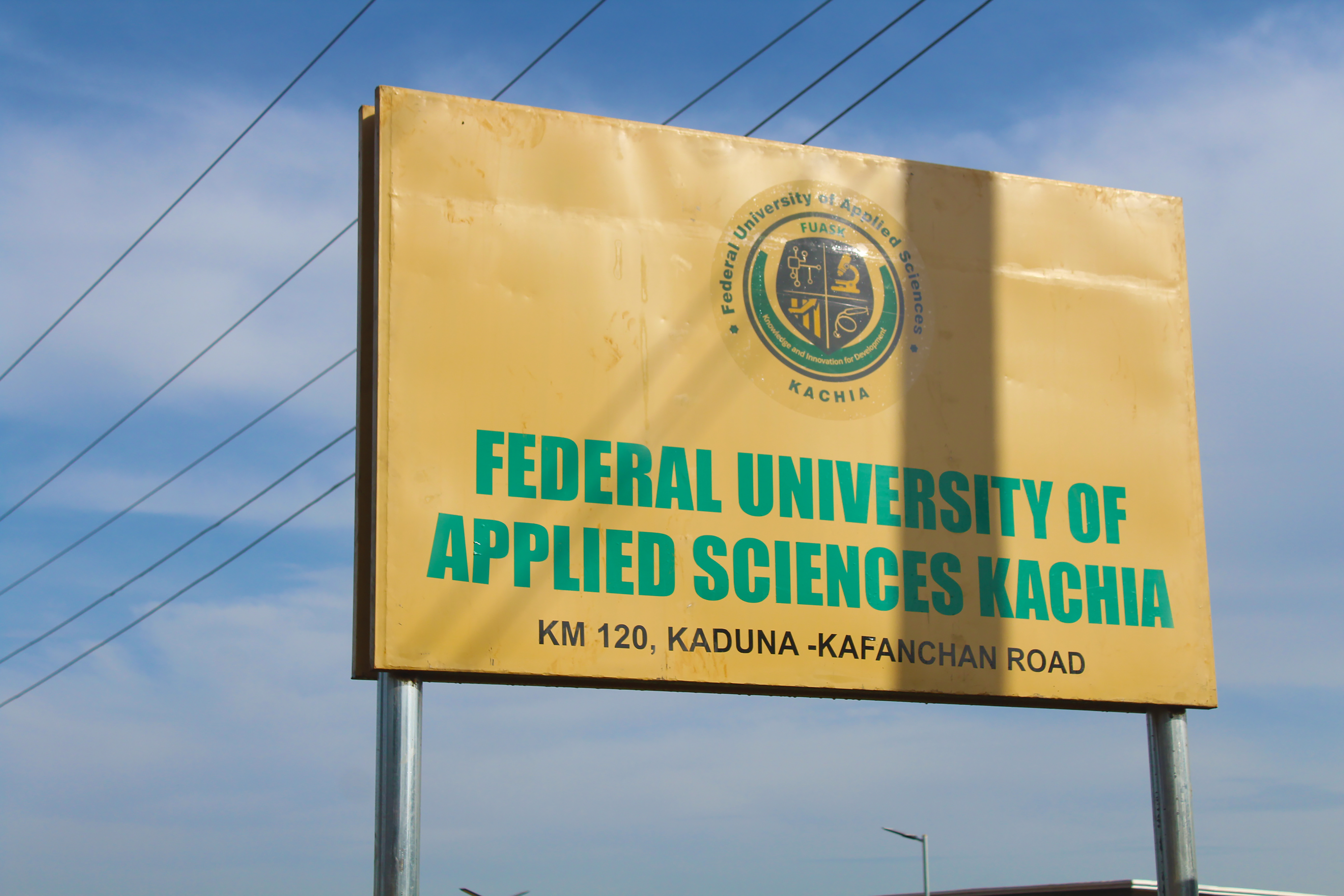
FUASK Signpost on the highway

== See also ==
- List of universities in Nigeria
- Education in Nigeria
