= Asagwara =

- Gender: Male
- Language: Igbo

Origin
- Origin: Nigeria
- Meaning: Unreliable
- Region of origin: South East, Nigeria

Asagwara audio is a Nigerian surname. It is a masculine name and primarily of Igbo origin, which means "unreliable".

== People with the name ==
- Rommel Asagwara (born 1983), Nigerian physician
- Uzoma Asagwara, Canadian politician
