= Trinisha Browne =

Trinidadian-Canadian record executive

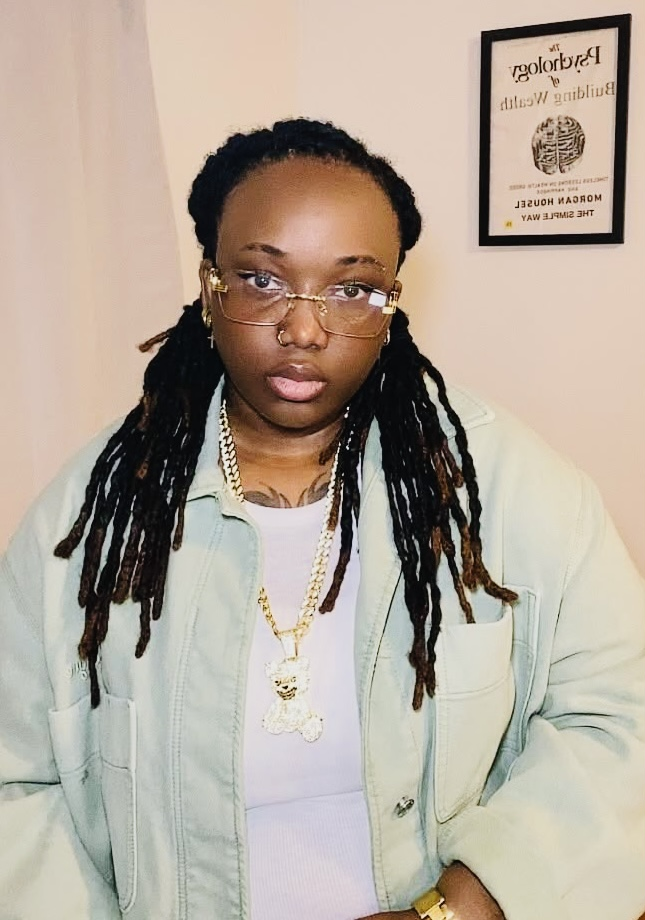
- Portrait of Trinisha Browne
- Born: Kadisha Onika Allen; Trinidad and Tobago
- Citizenship: Trinidadian; Canadian
- Occupations: Record executive; singer-songwriter
- Employer: Nnamani Music Group
- Known for: A&R, Founder & CEO of Browne Records
- Title: Head of A&R
- Musical career
- Origin: Trinidad
- Genres: Afrobeats; R&B; Dancehall; Hip-hop
- Label: Browne Records

Kadisha Onika Allen, known professionally as Trinisha Browne is a Trinidadian-Canadian artiste and music executive who serves as the first Head of A&R at Nnamani Music Group. Within her executive role, she has secured distribution partnerships with Virgin Music Africa. Her contributions as a recording artist were cited by the cultural publication Voir as a significant part of the 2017 Québec’s rap scene.

== Early life ==
Browne was born in Trinidad and Tobago and later relocated to Canada in Montreal, Quebec, where she established her music career. She began writing music as a teenager. She is queer.

== Career ==
Her EP, Thought You Should Know (2017), earned coverage from Vice Québec. In 2018, the cultural magazine Voir ranked Browne’s short album Thought You Should Know at number 43 on its list of the 50 best rap projects of 2017, highlighting her as part of Québec’s emerging rap scene. That same year, she opened with a performance for Azealia Banks at L’Olympia in Montreal. Between 2019 and 2021, she released several projects including Red Roses (2019), Fumbled (2020), and Good Vibes Only, Vol. 1 (2021), which reflected a growing emphasis on Afro-Caribbean and Afro fusion influences. Browne released her debut album Rhythm & Love via SRG-ILS Group in 2024. Her music has received rotation on national broadcasters such as Radio Canada International and CBC Radio.

In 2020, she founded Browne Records, securing distribution partnerships with Universal Music and Virgin Music Africa. Browne performed at the PHI Centre in Montreal, alongside artists such as Pierre Kwenders, Lydia Képinski, Shay Lia, Marie-Pierre Arthur, Imposs among others. The EP Good Vibes Only, Vol. 1 by Trinisha Browne is shown on PalmarèsADISQ with a release date of January 15, 2021. She was ranked among the top acts in the Best Hip Hop Act category of Cult MTL’s 2020 Best of MTL, alongside fellow Canadian artist Backxwash, Alaclair Ensemble, Dead Obies, Nomadic Massive, and FouKi, among others. In 2024, she signed a distribution deal with Universal Music Africa and Virgin Music Africa. That year, she released a song “Matchmade”, featuring Nigerian artist Temmie Ovwasa.

On October 22, 2025, Billboard Canada reported that Trinidadian-Canadian artist Trinisha Browne was appointed as the first Head of A&R at Nnamani Music Group by co-founder Johnel Nnamani.

== Recognition ==
Year	Organization	Category	Note	Ref
2020	Cult MTL Best of MTL	Best Hip Hop Act	Ranked among the top acts	
