= Nnamdi =

Male given name

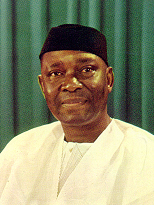
- A picture of Nnamdi Azikiwe c. 1963
- Pronunciation: /ˈnnæmdiː/ (The "n" sound needs to be held for twice as long, like in Italian’s "anno")
- Gender: Male

Origin
- Origin: Igbo
- Meaning: My father lives
- Region of origin: Southeast Nigeria

Other names
- Related names: Nnenna

Nnamdi // is an Igbo male given name. It means "my father lives". Traditionally, boys born after the death of a father, grandfather, or great-grandfather were named Nnamdi, as they were believed to be reincarnations.

Nnamdi is among the most popular names for Igbo boys, owing to its association with Nnamdi Azikiwe, the first prime minister of Nigeria and pioneering nationalist. He was one of the driving forces behind the country’s independence in 1960.

== Notable people with this name ==
- Nnamdi Asomugha (born 1981), American football player
- Nnamdi Azikiwe (1904–1996), Nigerian politician and president
- Nnamdi Kanu (born 1967), British political activist
- Nnamdi Madubuike (born 1997), American football player
- Nnamdi Moweta (born 1958), American radio host
- Nnamdi Oduamadi (born 1990), Nigerian football player
- Nnamdi Ogbonnaya (born 1990), American musician
- Nnamdi Udoh (born 1960), Nigerian businessman
- Kojo Nnamdi (born 1945), American journalist

== See also ==
- Nnamani
