= William Barnabas Qurix =

Nigerian university administrator, educationist, and researcher

- Born: 4 November 1961 (age 64)
- Education: Ahmadu Bello University, Zaria, Nigeria
- Occupations: • Educationist • University administrator • Researcher

William Barnabas Qurix or Williams Barnabas Qurix (born November 4, 1961) is a Nigerian university administrator, educationist, and researcher. He was appointed the pioneer Vice-Chancellor of the Federal University of Applied Sciences Kachia (FUASK) by the Nigerian president, Bola Tinubu, in March 2025. He is a former Vice-Chancellor of Kaduna State University and Bingham University (2018-2024). A month before his appointment at FUASK, he was appointed Chairman Governing Council and Pro-Chancellor of Plateau State University, Bokkos, by the Plateau State governor, Caleb Mutfwang.

== Early life and education ==
Qurix obtained an M.Sc. and a PhD in architecture from Ahmadu Bello University, Zaria. He also obtained a master's degree in law from the University of Jos, in 2001.

Vanguard Nigeria quoted Qurix, stating that after his appointment as the pioneer Vice-Chancellor of the Federal University of Applied Sciences Kachia, saying:

Our mission is to train men and women and equip them with knowledge and skills that can bring transformational development and progress. Indeed, progress and development have come to the people. This requires focus, hard work, partnerships, transnational education and linkages. So, we will knock on the doors of world universities to seek partnerships.

— Bankole, Idowu (26 March 2025). "VC Varsity Kachia Resumes work, says progress development has come to the people". Vanguard News.

== Academic career ==
Qurix worked as a part-time lecturer at Ahmadu Bello University, Zaria, from 1985 to 1986. He was the fourth Vice Chancellor of Kaduna State University, and the former Vice Chancellor of Bingham University, New Karu. Currently, he is the Vice Chancellor of the Federal University of Applied Sciences Kachia (FUASK). He was appointed by President Bola Ahmed Tinubu.
