= Nok University Kachia =

Defunct private university in Kachia, Nigeria

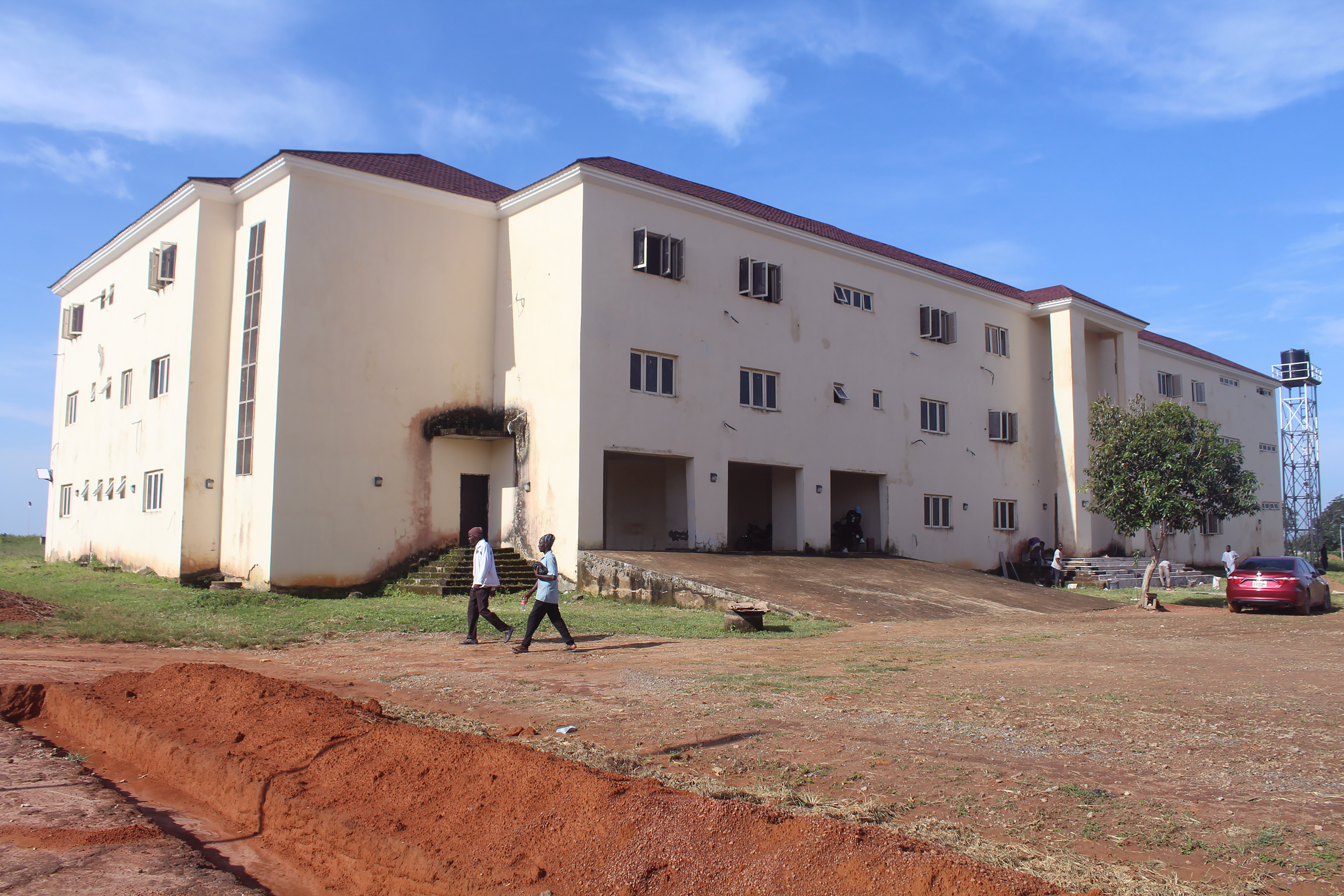
- Type: Private
- Active: 2021–2024
- Location: Kachia, Southern Kaduna, Nigeria; 09°53′00″N 07°58′35″E
- Campus: Suburban
- Nickname: NUK
- Website: nuk.org.ng

Nok University Kachia (NUK), was a private university in Kachia, southern Kaduna State, Nigeria. It was established on February 3, 2021, as the first indigenous private university in the state (the first private university in the state is Greenfield University). Following a legal tussle between the founder of the school, Anthony Hassan, and the Nigerian Federal government agency, the EFCC, an interim forfeiture of all the school assets was granted on June 1, 2022, by a Federal High Court in Abuja and a final order of forfeiture on June 7, 2024. In February 2025, however, its assets were handed over to be used for the newly approved Federal University of Applied Sciences Kachia by the Federal Government of Nigeria.

== History ==
In 2020, the university was proposed to be created by Anthony Hassan to produce self-employed graduates, giving an upper hand to science-related courses. The proposed university was to begin with the faculties of engineering, environmental sciences, and medicine. The proposal to establish the university was approved by the Nigerian federal government, alongside 19 other universities, on February 3, 2021. On March 2, 2021, Bishop Matthew Hassan Kukah inaugurated the university's Governing Board, with himself as its chairman. On April 9, 2021, Professor Ishaya Haruna Nock was appointed Vice-Chancellor and Obadiah Joshua as the Acting Registrar of the university by its Governing Board. On April 26, 2021, the National Universities Commission approved 12 courses for the university's take off. In May 2021, 15 courses were introduced for the commencement of its 2020/2021 academic year.

== Organization ==
The Nok University Kachia was an accredited provider of higher education in Nigeria. As of 2024 when it was closed, the university only offered Bachelor's Degree courses.

It started operations with the 2020/2021 academic session. The school started with four faculties, namely, the Faculty of Basic Sciences, Faculty of Environmental Sciences, Faculty of Sciences and Computing, and Faculty of Research. The school had a total land area of 109 hectares.

Its pioneering Vice-Chancellor was Prof. Ishaya Haruna Nock, and Obadiah Joshua its first registrar.

== Accreditations and certifications ==
Nok University Kachia and its 15 study programs were accredited by the Nigerian Universities Commission. It got registered in Nigeria with the registration number RC 1617510 under the Company and Allied Matters Acts of 1990.

== Degree programs ==
=== Bachelor (undergraduate) ===
Language of Instruction: English

- Anatomy (full-time)
- Architecture (full-time)
- Biotechnology (full-time)
- Computer Science (full-time)
- Cyber Security (full-time)
- Environmental Management (full-time)
- Health Information (full-time)
- Industrial Chemistry (full-time)
- Information Technology (full-time)
- Medicical Laboratory Science (full-time)
- Microbiology (full-time)
- Nursing Science (full-time)
- Physiology (full-time)
- Quantity Surveying (full-time)
- Radiography (full-time)

== Forfeiture ==
The school assets declared to be forfeited by the court included the Senate building, Faculty of Medicine building, Science Deanery building, two Academic buildings, ICT building, a faculty hall and some other buildings.
