= Nnenna =

- Gender: Female
- Language: Igbo

Origin
- Word/name: Igboland
- Meaning: Father's mother

Nnenna // is an Igbo female name that means "father's mother". It is given to girls born after the death of their paternal grandmother, who they are, traditionally, held to be reincarnations of. Similarly, there is Nnenne ("mother's mother"), for the maternal grandmother. The male equivalent is Nnamdi.

== Notable people named Nnenna ==
- Nnenna Freelon (born 1954), American jazz singer
- Nnenna Lynch (born 1971), retired distance track event runner
- Lydia Nnenna Obute, Nigerian-Austrian model
- Nnenna Nwakanma (born 1975), Nigerian activist
- Adaora Nnenna Elonu (born 1990), Nigerian-American basketball player
- Nnenna Okore (born 1975), Nigerian artist
- Ifeoma Nnenna Dieke (born 1981), American-born Scottish footballer
- Nnenna Akwajah (Born 2006), Irish-born Nigerian HR Manager

== See also ==
- Nnena Kalu (born 1966), British-Nigerian artist
