= Canada–Trinidad and Tobago relations =

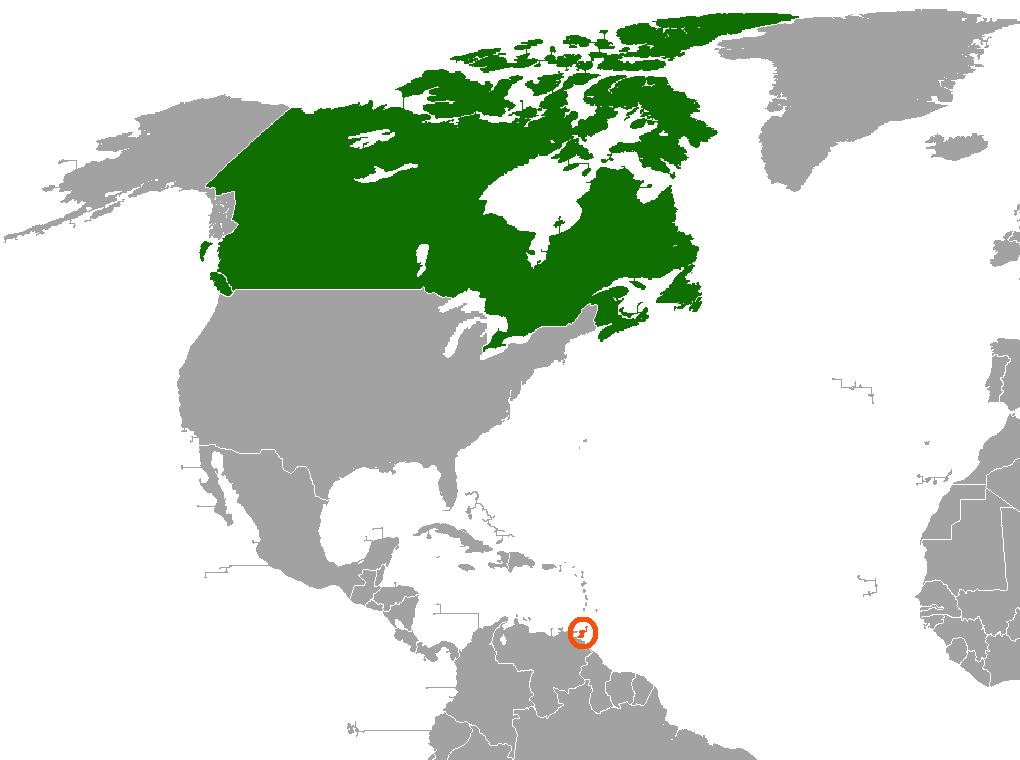

- Canada: Trinidad and Tobago

Canada and Trinidad and Tobago established full diplomatic relations in August 1962 after Trinidad's Independence. Since establishing relations, Trinidad and Tobago Defense Force have trained alongside Canadian Forces. As of 2023, there were an estimated 115,225 Trinidadian and Tobagonian Canadians and 4,000 Canadians living in Trinidad and Tobago, 92% of which hold dual citizenship.

== Education ==
Students in Trinidad and Tobago Universities are eligible for scholarships to Canadian Universities. Tens of thousands of student visas are approved each year by Canada's High Commission.

== Trade ==
Bilateral trade totalled $750 million in 2022 between the two nations. Canada's exports to Trinidad and Tobago amounted to $705 million and included oil, mineral ores, machinery, and food products. Canada imported $330 million worth of goods from Trinidad and Tobago in 2022 which included organic chemicals and food products. Canadian investments in the country are concentrated in Trinidad's petrochemical, oil and gas industries.

== Resident diplomatic missions ==
- Canada has a High Commission in Port of Spain.
- Trinidad and Tobago has a High Commission in Ottawa and a Consulate-General in Toronto.
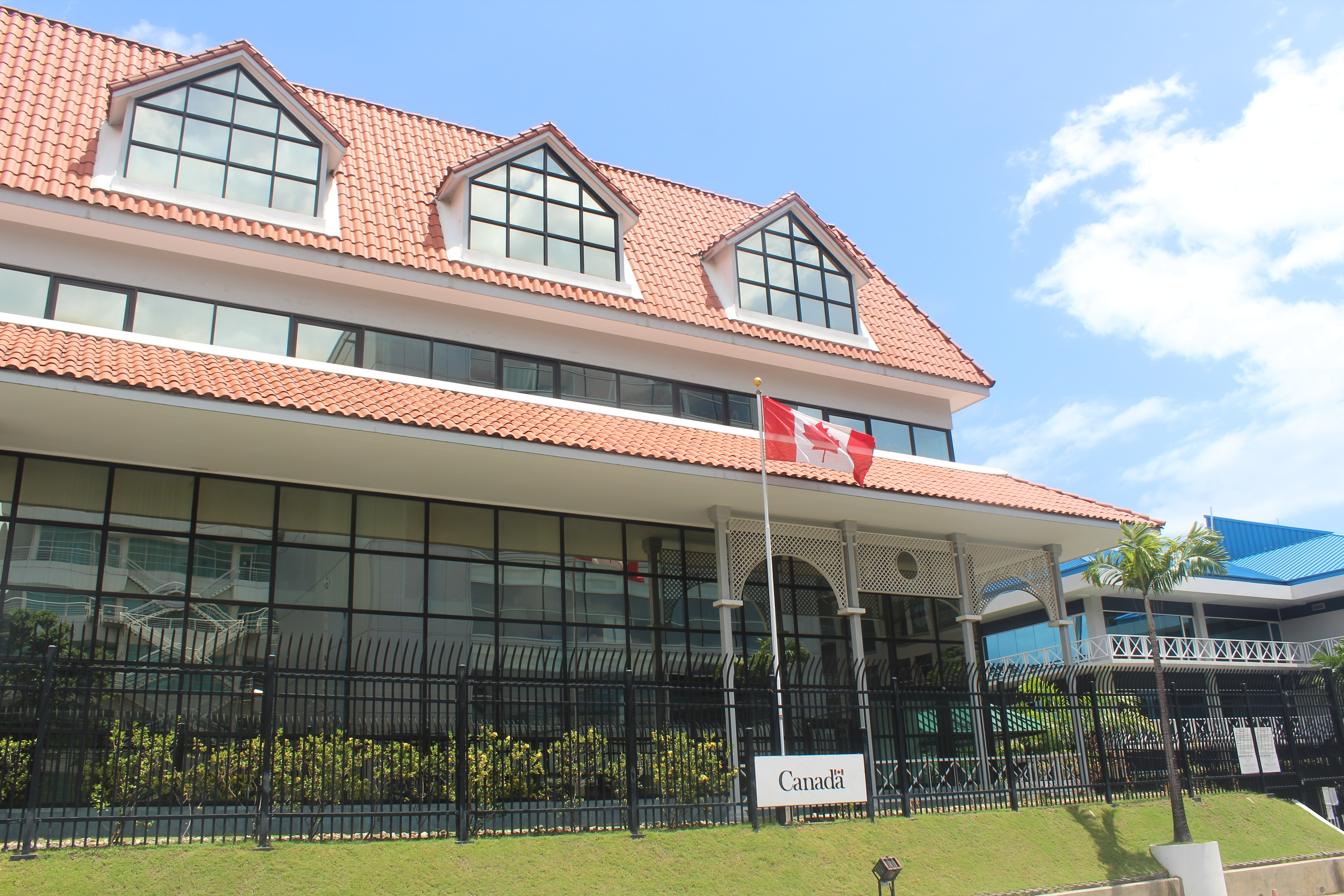
High Commission of Canada in Port of Spain

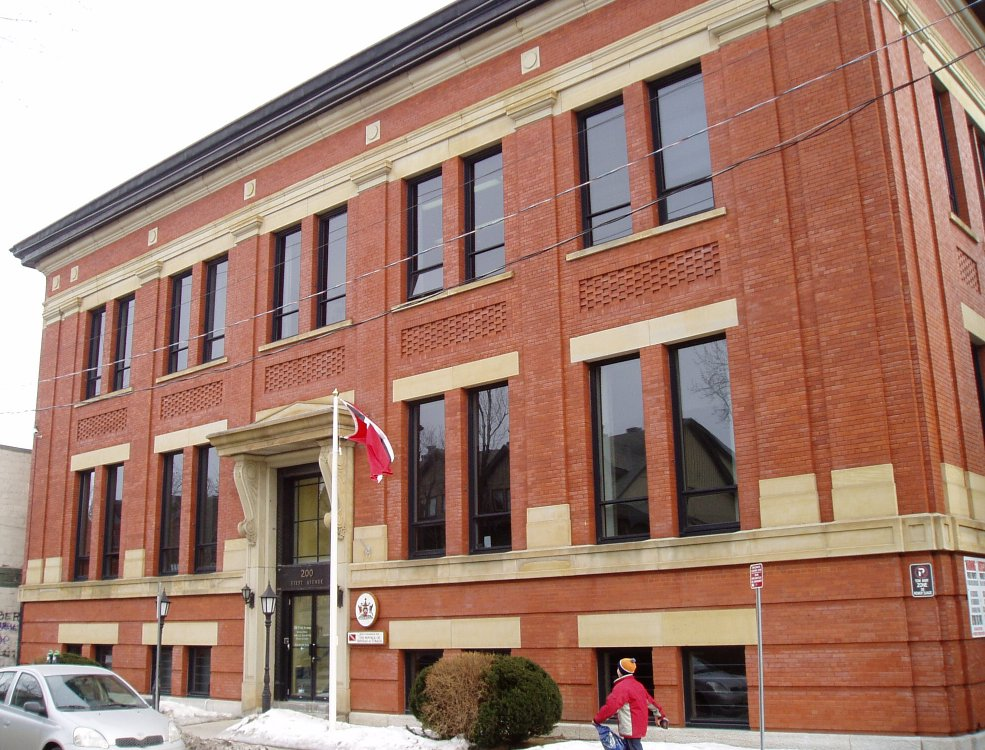
High Commission of Trinidad and Tobago in Ottawa

== See also ==
- Trinidadian and Tobagonian Canadians
