= Mahmood Ahmadu =

Nigerian entrepreneur

- Born: 9 September 1966 (age 59); Lagos, Nigeria
- Occupation: Entrepreneur
- Website: mahmoodahmadu.com

Mahmood Ahmadu (born 9 September 1966), is a Nigerian entrepreneur. He is Founder and Executive chairman of OIS, also known as Online Integrated Solutions Ltd.

== Early life and education ==
Mahmood was born in Nigeria. He obtained his MBA from Nasarawa State University. His further education came in the form of management, IT and communication industry courses, where he utilized these skills to start small businesses that traded products and services.

== Career ==
In the early 1980s, Mahmood got an inheritance from his father, which he used to invest in his first company, known as A2A International Limited. The company made him known in the field of trading in GSM in Northern Nigeria. He further leveraged his business over the next several years and expanded his venture both locally and internationally. He has also raised awareness on the importance of education and has contributed to the quality of education through scholarship programs.

== Awards and recognition ==
Mahmood holds the National Honor of the Officer of the Order of the Niger (OON).

Year	Award ceremony	Prize	Result
2016	BEFFTA Awards	Lifetime Achievement Award	Won
2016	Asian Voice Charity Awards	Empowering Local Communities	Won
2016	ISAC	Nigerian Economic Development Award	Won
