= Sowemimo Abiodun =

Nigerian entrepreneur

Sowemimo Abiodun Alex
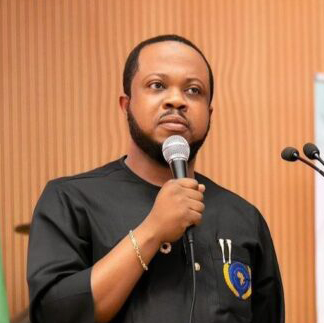
- Born: Sowemimo Abiodun Alex; 25 December 1986 (age 39); Lagos, Nigeria
- Citizenship: Nigerian
- Occupations: Computer programmer, business executive
- Honours: Most Promising Youth Award from Abdel Fattah el-Sisi

Sowemimo Abiodun Alex (born 25 December 1986) is a Nigerian tech, computer programmer, business financial technologist, business executive, data scientist and the President of Cyberpedia Internet Governance, InfoMetriQ Data Network, iNet Telecommunications, and Vapour Paints. He was the founder of PagePedia, a global data system of information profiling application.

== Early life and career ==
Sowemimo Abiodun was born on 25 December in 1986 in Lagos, Nigeria. Abiodun is the President of Cyberpedia Internet Governance, a technology company described in professional profiles as focusing on data systems, cybersecurity, and internet governance. He has also been associated with founding or leading other ventures including iNet Telecommunications, CapitalMetriQ Swift Bank, InfoMetriQ Data Network, and Silicon Airways.

In March 2019, he received the "Most Promising Youth Award" from the Egyptian president Abdel Fattah El-Sisi at the World Youth Forum. Additionally, he serves as the president of Africa Emerging Generation of Innovator. Abiodun has been recognized internationally, including being honored as one of the Most Influential People of African Descent (Global 100 Futurists & Innovators) at an event tied to the United Nations International Decade for People of African Descent. Profiles on technology council platforms list him as a member of professional networks such as the Forbes Technology Council and the Forbes Finance Council, which are invitation-only communities for senior leaders in technology and finance.

Under Abiodun’s leadership, Cyberpedia has been recognized in media coverage for its role in digital governance and cybersecurity. For example, it has been acknowledged by international organizations and forums for innovation in data and technology governance.
