= Ayobami Akindipe =

Nigerian real estate developer and youth empowerment advocate

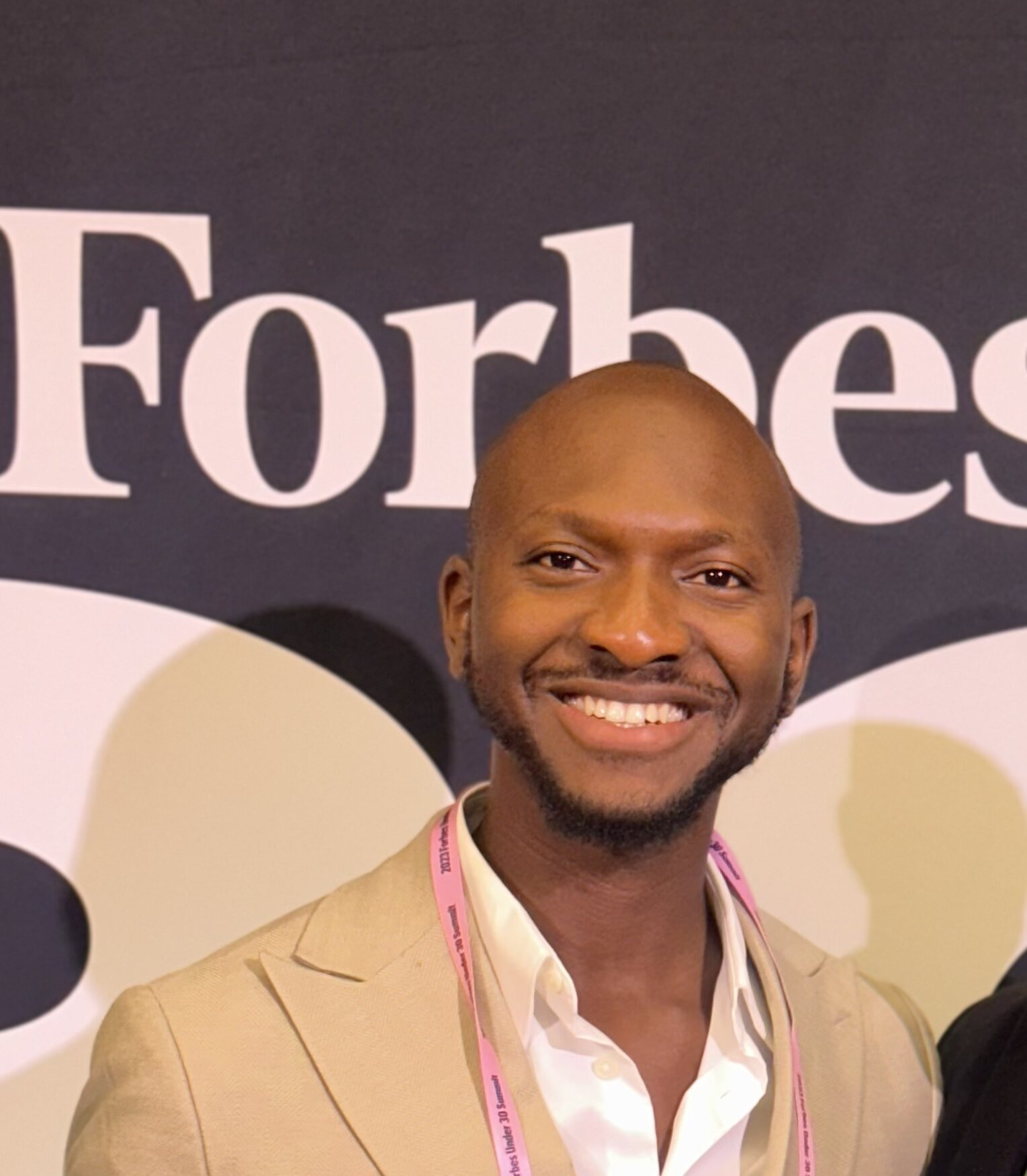
- Born: Ayobami Oluwanifemi Akindipe; 27 August 1997 (age 29); Owo, Ondo State, Nigeria
- Education: Kogi State University; Lagos Business School – EDC
- Occupations: Entrepreneur; Real estate developer; Youth empowerment advocate
- Known for: Founder of ACE Real Estate; ACE Academy
- Title: Chief Executive Officer, ACE Real Estate
- Awards: Young Real Estate Person of the Year (2024); Forbes 30 Under 30 (2025)

Ayobami Akindipe is a Nigerian real estate developer and entrepreneur. He is the founder and chief executive officer of Ace Real Estate Development Ltd, a real estate development company operating in Nigeria, Rwanda, and South Africa.

== Early life and career ==
Ayobami Oluwanifemi Akindipe was born on 27 August 1997 to Nigerian parents and hails from Owo, Ondo State. He completed his primary and secondary education in Lagos State and later studied law at Kogi State University.

Akindipe began working at the age of 13, as a bricklayer. He later transitioned into sales and became a licensed real estate agent by the age of 21.

In 2019, he set up Ace Real Estate Development Ltd, a real estate development and management company. The company has delivered over 120 housing units and operates in Nigeria, Rwanda, and South Africa.

In 2022, Akindipe set up ACE Academy, a free empowerment initiative focused on equipping underserved Nigerian youth with real estate, sales, and entrepreneurial skills. Since its inception, the Academy has trained and mentored over 25,000 young people, many of whom have gone on to earn income, close property deals, and start their own businesses.

In 2025, he was named a Forbes Africa 30 Under 30 honoree for his contributions to real estate development, youth empowerment, and economic inclusion across Africa.

== Awards and recognition ==
- (2021) Excellence and Integrity Award – Nelson Mandela Leadership Awards.
- (2021) Icon of Societal Transformation Award – National Association of University Students.
- (2021) Golden Role Model Award – Nigeria Youth Advocacy for Good Governance Initiative.
- (2021) Special Gold Award – Chartered Institute of Public Resources Management and Politics, Ghana.
- (2021) Young Entrepreneur of the Year – Young Entrepreneurs International Summit.
- (2023) Real Estate Developer of the Year – The Daily Sun recognition.
- (2023) Top 7 Real Estate Players – City People Magazine feature.
- (2024) Young Real Estate Person of the Year – Awarded for outstanding leadership and sectoral impact by Thinkmint Nigeria.
- (2025) Forbes 30 Under 30 – Named among Africa’s most impactful young leaders by Forbes Africa.
- (2025) Cover Star – TTYBrand Africa Magazine – Featured as a visionary leader on the cover of TTYBrand Africa.
