= Ugi Augustine Ugi =

Nigerian Tech Entrepreneur

- Born: Ugi Augustine Ugi; January, 1986; Obudu, Cross River State
- Education: Middlesex University
- Known for: Software and Technology

Ugi Augustine Ugi is a Nigerian technology entrepreneur and solutions architect. He is best known as the founder and President of Nugi Technologies.

== Background ==
Ugi was born in Obudu, Cross River State, Nigeria, in January 1986. He battled sickle cell disease from a young age and attended the West African Peoples Institute in Calabar. Initially wanting to study medicine, Ugi pivoted to Computer Science after a teacher taught him how to build a computer from scratch. In 2006, he began building websites commercially after receiving a partial scholarship for an e-commerce and web development training program. By 2008, he was working in a cybercafé while continuing to develop websites and learning software and computer systems.

== Education ==
From 2008, Ugi studied Software Development at the National Institute of Information and Technology (NIIT). While working as an unpaid intern at Hot Minet Services, and local purchase intermediary for Amazon in Nigeria, to save money for his education, he gained a Cross River State Scholarship, and moved to the United Kingdom in 2012 to study at Middlesex University after previously deferring twice due the inability to afford the tuition fees. He later obtained a Bachelor’s Degree in Information Technology and Business Information Systems, graduating with First Class Honours.

== Career ==
Ugi co-founded GTCO Calscan in December 2012. He left the company in December 2015 but remained as a consultant until 2016.

=== Nugi Technologies ===
On January 21, 2016, Ugi founded Nugi Technologies as a technology and software development business serving corporate and government clients. In 2018, it developed 360Datalytics, which was subsequently developed into the fintech product OneMoni. The company later expanded outside Nigeria, establishing operations in the United Kingdom in 2023. Currently known for developing technology across software, digital payments, etc., it became part of the wider Nugi Group with interests across several technology-enabled sectors.

Through writing, Ugi has also contributed commentary to several publications on technology, digital infrastructure and public-sector transformation. He has also spoken locally and internationally on investment and technology development in Africa.

== Health Advocacy ==
Ugi has spoken publicly about living and working with sickle cell disease. His experiences informed his interest in health technology and the potential use of wearable devices and digital health systems to support people living with chronic conditions. His book Blood of the Phoenix: A Memoir of Sickle Cell, Faith, and Service also discusses his experiences with the disease.

== Awards & Recognition ==
Ugi was named "Technology and Innovation Entrepreneur of the Year" at the 2024 People-First Enterprise Awards in Cross River State.

He received the Meritorious Award of Honour from the Cross River State Political Network (CRISPON) on March 4, 2026.
