= Tejumola Maurice-Diya =

Nigerian fashion designer (born 1987)

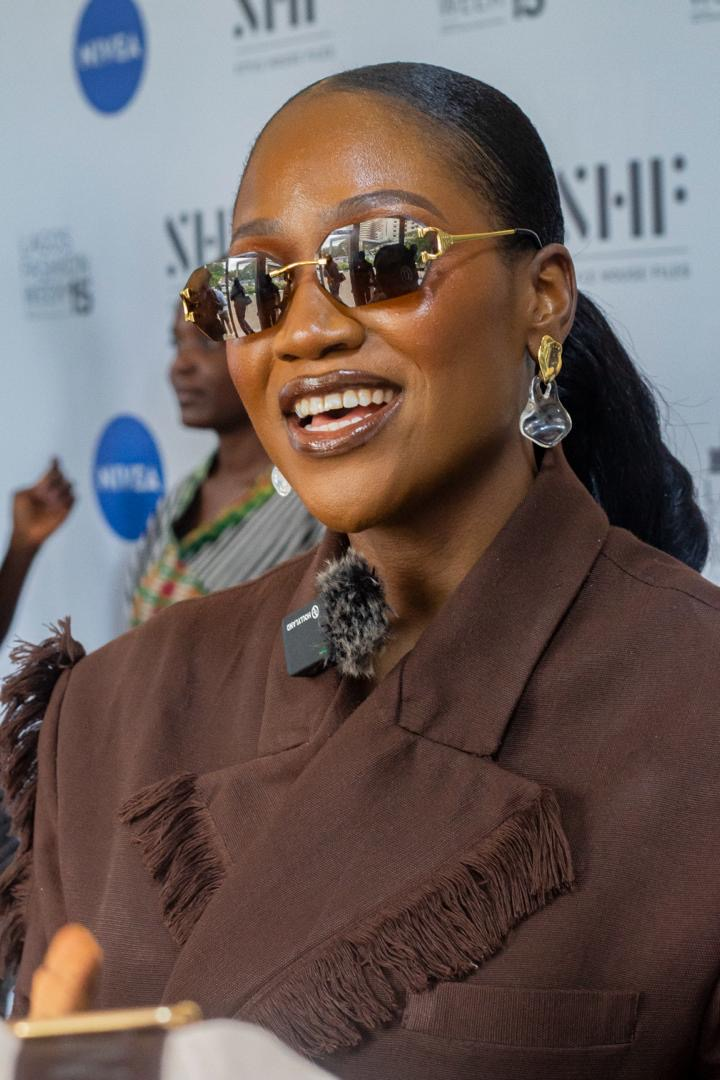
- Tejumola Maurice-Diya in 2026
- Born: Tejumola Maurice; 27 December 1987 (age 38); Chicago
- Occupations: Fashion designer, entrepreneur, model

Tejumola Maurice-Diya (born 27 December 1987) is a Nigerian-American fashion designer, entrepreneur and model. She is the principal and founder of fashion organization, The Fashioned Museum and owner of children's clothing brand, Toddler's Clan Limited.

== Early life and education ==
Tejumola Maurice-Diya was born on 27 December 1987 in Chicago, Illinois, where she also grew up. Tejumola attended the University of Illinois Urbana-Champaign. She studied Communication.

== Career ==
=== Fashion Design ===
Tejumola Maurice-Diya owns Toddler Clan Limited, a fashion brand that focuses on children's clothing. She specializes in attires made from African fabrics, particularly adire, aso oke and ankara.

In a 2017 interview, Tejumola revealed that she established Toddler Clan Limited after having difficulty finding quality, stylish African children's wears, following the birth of her child. She also said her experience as an associate designer in America and several fashion trainings helped her start the company. In the same interview, she said that her goal was to see African clothing and culture blended into western life.

In 2023, she organized a training programme christened "Bridging The Gap," which was, among other things, aimed at preparing Nigerian fashion designers for collaborations with international fashion brands and mentoring high school students. Speaking at the event, Tejumola said her plan was to hold the programme annually.

The following year, she ran an African textile art campaign. Branded "30 Days of Àdìrẹ," the campaign promoted adire and showed many outfits that could be made from the fabric.

=== Modelling ===
Tejumola began her modelling career during her university years. Her first modelling jobs were for fashion designers at African students events.

In 2022, rumors emerged that she had retired from modelling, following years of inactivity in the industry. However, in a 2023 interview, she said she was still available for modelling jobs. Asked if she was still modelling, she said, "Not really. But, I am very open to modelling. It is something that I am passionate about. If you check my page, you will find that most of the reels are a result of my modelling."

== See also ==
- List of Nigerian entrepreneurs
