= Joseph James Nantomah =

Nigerian businessman

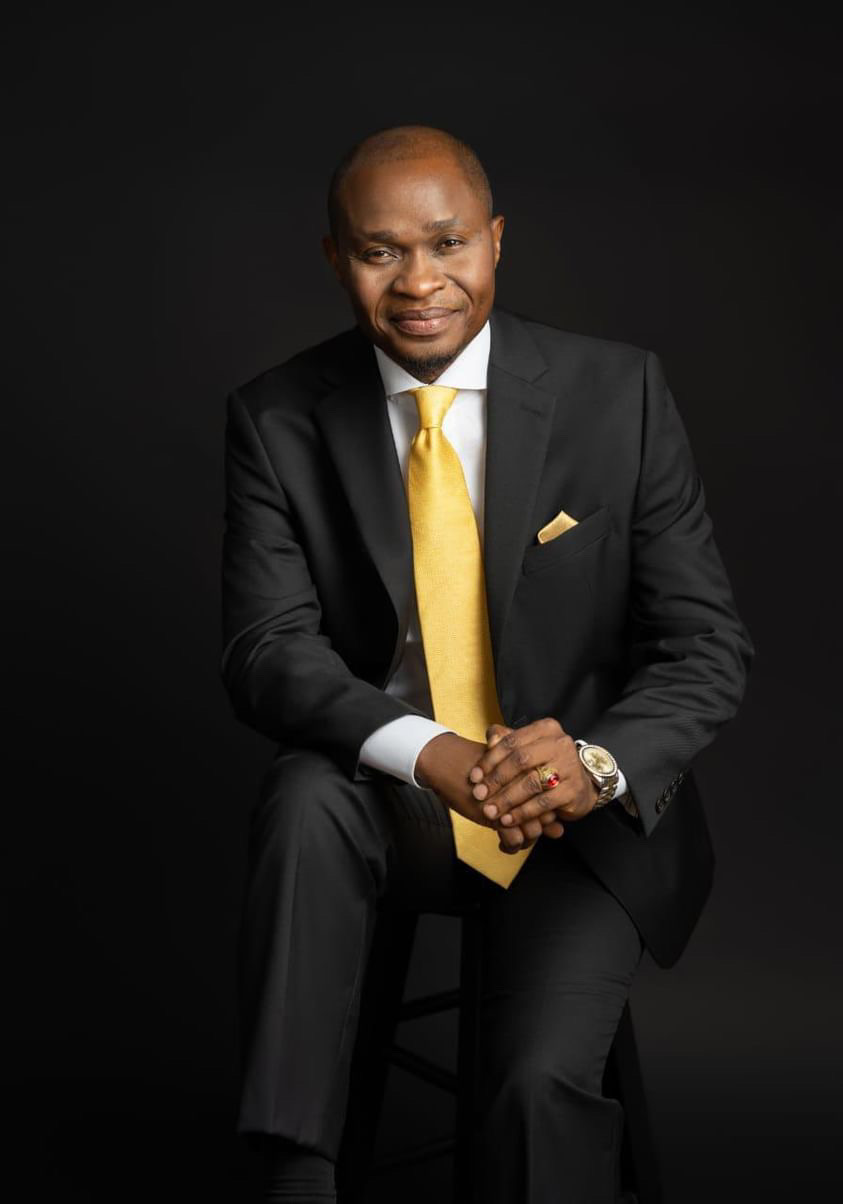
- Born: Joseph James Nantomah; 31 December 1976 (age 49); Rivers State, Nigeria
- Other name: Black Mentor
- Occupations: Businessman; life coach; investor
- Website: josephnantomah.com

Joseph James Nantomah (born 31 December 1976) also known as Black Mentor is a Nigerian businessman, investor and life coach.

On Sept 21st 2026 Joseph Nantomah was sentenced to 48 months imprisonment for Scamming investors out of over 2.7 million dollars

https://www.justice.gov/usao-edwi/pr/nigerian-man-sentenced-48-months-imprisonment-investment-fraud-scheme

== Biography ==
Nantomah was born on 31 December 1976 in Borokiri, Port Harcourt, Rivers State, Nigeria to a father who was a sailor. Growing up, Nantomah read books authored by Robert Kiyosaki and Tony Robbins, amongst others.

In 2008, Nantomah began his career in project management. Three years later, in 2011, he founded a project management training program in Lagos where he trained over 3,000 bankers from various institutions across Nigeria, excluding Zenith Bank, which had its own training structure at the time.

In 2016, Nantomah and his family moved to the United States where he started to invest in real estate. He served as a campaign staff member for Scott Walker, the then governor of Wisconsin, and was also a member of the national planning committee for Tony Evers, the incumbent governor of Wisconsin. In September 2020, Nantomah was recognized by the 45th President of the United States Donald Trump with the President’s Honours Roll.

During the Russia-Ukraine crisis, Nantomah contributed to efforts facilitating the return of Nigerians stranded in Ukraine. He holds an honorary degree from American Heritage University of Southern California, and has been featured in the print editions of The Wall Street Journal and Marquis Who’s Who.

On August 6, 2025, the United States Securities and Exchange Commission charged Joseph Nantomah and his three Wisconsin based companies with operating a real estate-related offering fraud, targeting members of the Nigerian-American community.

2026 arrest News == References ==
