= S. O. Shonibare =

Nigerian politician

Chief Samuel Olatunbosun Shonibare (January 8, 1920 - January 1964) was a Nigerian businessman and politician who was a founding member of the Action Group (AG), he was an active member of the party from its formation until his death in 1964. Shonibare acted as the publicity secretary for the party and also performed fund raising duties for the Action Group.

He held the chieftaincy title of the Asiwaju of Ijebu.

== Life and career ==
Born in January 1920, Shonibare was the son of Sadiku Shonibare-Sanusi. His career began in 1936 as a clerk for U.A.C in Ibadan, where he worked from 1936 to 1942. He was then promoted to chief clerk and book-keeper at Ijebu-Ode in 1942. He rose to become office manager, technical department before leaving the firm in 1952. Upon leaving U.A.C, he joined Amalgamated Press, publishers of the Daily Service - a political mouth-piece of the Action Group. During his tenure, the company launched the Sunday Express, an apolitical weekly magazine, and also the Daily Express in partnership with the Thomson Group. Under his leadership, Amalgamated Press had editors like Bisi Onabanjo and Lateef Jakande, two future governors.

In 1958, Shonibare became managing director of the National Investment Property Company. He was invited to be the MD by S.O. Gbadamosi, a board member.

While working for U.A.C. in Ijebu Ode, his supervisor was Mr Samuel Olukoya. At a party in 1942, he was introduced to his daughter Ms. Alice Olukoya. They got married in 1946.

=== N.I.P.C. ===
He was managing director of a controversial company, National Investment and Properties Corporation, a private company that was linked with AG and the regional government and whose directors were all party members. The company was formed in 1958 by the Action Group to evade a new piece of legislation curtailing the use of banks to finance party activities. Previously, the party was involved in a murky arrangement with National Bank for financing. Under N.I.P.C.'s relationship with AG, the private firm borrowed money from the Western regional marketing board to invest in the country. The money was used to develop some properties that included Cocoa House, Ibadan and Western House, Broad Street, Lagos. In 1962, a tribunal under Justice G.B.A. Coker probed a six-million-pound loan that was extended to N.I.P.C. by the Western Region Marketing Board. At the inquiry, it was noted that N.I.P.C. was an investment arm of the Action Group to fund party activities. The assets of N.I.P.C. were transferred to WEMABOD.

When a state of emergency became effective in the region, Shonibare was limited to Ondo town; he died in January 1964, weeks after the state of emergency was lifted. Shonibare was chairman of Amalgamated Press Ltd, Ikeja. Prior to his death, he founded Shonny Investments which was in the process of developing Maryland Estate. He was also involved in a mobile film unit and a printing business.
