= Stella Chinyelu Okoli =

Nigerian pharmacist and entrepreneur (born 1944)

Stella Chinyelu Okoli OON, MON
- Born: 1944 (age 81–82); Kano State, Nigeria
- Education: University of Bradford; Chelsea College (University of London)
- Occupations: Pharmacist; entrepreneur
- Years active: 1976–present

Stella Chinyelu Okoli // (MON, OON) (born c. 1944) is a Nigerian pharmacist, philanthropist and entrepreneur. She is the founder and current chief executive officer of Emzor pharmaceutical manufacturing company founded in 1977.

== Early life and education ==
Stella Okoli was born in Kano State, Northern Nigeria into the family of Felix Ebelechukwu and Margaret Modebelu, descents of Nnewi clan in Anambra State. She started her formal education in 1954 after enrolling as a pupil at All Saints Primary School, Onitsha before proceeding to complete her secondary school education in 1964 at Ogidi Girls Secondary School, Ogidi.

In 1969, Stella Okoli graduated from the University of Bradford after studying Pharmacy. She also holds an M.Sc. certificate in Biopharmaceutical after graduating from the University of London, Chelsea College in 1971.

== Career ==
Prior to the establishment of Emzor Pharmaceutical, Stella Okoli had worked in several pharmaceutical firms including Middlesex Hospital, London, Boots the Chemists Limited and Pharma-Deko.

In January 1977, Stella Okoli started Emzor Pharmaceutical with the initial name "Emzor Chemists Limited" as a small pharmacy retail shop in Somolu, Lagos State. Emzor Pharmaceutical has since become one of the leading pharmaceutical companies in Nigeria with over 50 products since its incorporation in 1984.

A current member of the Economic Summit of Nigeria and the Health Matters Advisory Board of Nigeria, Stella Okoli currently serves as the Vice President of Manufacturers Association of Nigeria and the Nigerian Association of Chambers of Commerce, Industry, Mines and Agriculture has served as Chairman of the Pharmaceutical Manufacturers Group and the Manufacturers Association of Nigeria.

== Philanthropy ==
After the death of her son Chike Okoli in 2005, Stella Okoli started the Chike Okoli Foundation in 2006 as a non-profit organisation founded with the aim of fighting against poverty and diseases by raising awareness on cardiovascular diseases. She also runs the Chike Okoli Centre for Entrepreneurial Studies.

== Awards and certification ==
Stella Okoli obtained her West African School Certificate in 1964 at Ogidi Girls’ Secondary School Ogidi, in Anambra State. She furthered her education by travelling to the United Kingdom where she got her Bachelor of Pharmacy BPharm(Hons) from University of Bradford, UK in 1969. In 1971, she earned a master's in biopharmaceuticals from the University of London, Chelsea College.

- International Entrepreneurial Challenge (IWEC) Award
- CePATHonors Lifetime Achievement Award 2014
- Ernst and Young Lifetime Achievement Award 2016
- Institute of Directors Lifetime Achievement Award 2016
- In recognition of her achievements and contributions to the health sector in Nigeria, Stella Okoli was bestowed with the Member of the Order of the Niger award.
- In 2012, she was honoured at the 17th ThisDay Annual Awards: Women of Distinction and Lifetime Achievers . She is also a recipient of the ECOWAS International Gold Award.

She is also an alumnus of Lagos Business School, Harvard Business School, Boston and I.E.S.E Business School in Barcelona, Spain.

- Honorary Doctor of Business Administration by Nnamdi Azikiwe University, Awka (2011)
- Silverbird Lifetime Achievement Award (2018)
- Nigeria Royalty Awards (2013)
- Business Person of the Year at the Sun Newspaper Awards (2016)
- Africa Women Innovation and Entrepreneurship Forum (2017)

== Personal life ==
Dr. Stella married her husband, Barr. Christopher Nnaemeka Okoli in 1970, with whom she had three children - Emeka Okoli, Uzoma Okoli and Chike Okoli.
