= Ndidi Nnoli-Edozien =

Nigerian social entrepreneur

- Born: Ndidi Nnoli Edozien; Germany
- Education: Queen's College Lagos; London School of Economics and Political Science; Johann Wolfgang Goethe University
- Occupation: Social Entrepreneur
- Notable work: Founder and president of the Growing Businesses Foundation

Ndidi Nnoli-Edozien (born July 31, 1972) is a Nigerian social entrepreneur and corporate social responsibility ) expert and Bottom of the Pyramid empowerment advocate. She is the founder and president of the Growing Businesses Foundation, Nigeria's largest Bottom of the Pyramid platform which has been managing corporate social responsibility projects for multinational corporations. She was appointed as a full-time member of the International Sustainability Standards Board in June 2022. Her status as a social entrepreneur has been recognized by the Bertelsmann AG to whom she is affiliated as a Reinhard Mohn Fellow.

At the Africa Conference on Women in Governance, Business and Community Leadership and Women of Influence Awards in London 2010, she received the African Star Excellence Award in Business Development. A member of the International Finance Corporation, Nnoli-Edozien has contributed to policy reforms in Nigeria through her work with government ministries and agencies.

== Education ==
Nnoli-Edozien was born in Karlsruhe City in Germany, graduated from Queen's College, Lagos in 1989 and studied at the London School of Economics and Political Science, United Kingdom earning a BSc in Economics. Nnoli-Edozien gained her PhD at the Johann Wolfgang Goethe University in social ethics, cultural adaptation, sustainability, and governance with a focus on the global applicability of African Models of Corporate Governance and Sustainability.

She is an alumnus of the Wharton Business School and has attended executive programmes at INSEAD and the Judge Business School, Cambridge.

== Career ==
As a full-time member of the International Sustainability Standards Board, Nnoli-Edozien is at the center of shaping how corporate sustainability disclosures are standardized and interpreted worldwide—impacting capital markets, regulators, and businesses globally.

She serves on several global boards, committees, and initiatives, including the German government's Sustainable Finance Advisory Board, Prof Mervyn King’s Good Governance Academy, Growing Businesses Foundation, ToroNet Association, the ESG Exchange. and as a steering committee member/adviser to various Pan-African initiatives including GFANZ Africa, PAFA and AFIAAR. She co-chairs SFBs Internationale AG and chairs the Integrated Reporting Advisory Board of the International Sustainability Standards Board, IFRS Foundation. She is an executive member of the Club of Rome, contributing to several key publications.

From 2017 to 2020, she served as the inaugural Group Chief Sustainability and Governance Officer of Africa's largest conglomerate, Dangote Industries Limited, where she was responsible for cultivating and implementing the company's sustainability culture, strategy, and reporting across 14 countries.

She taught ethics, sustainability, and social entrepreneurship at the Lagos Business School/Pan-Atlantic University

In 2012, Nnoli-Edozien was nominated by the International Finance Corporation as a Director of AB Microfinance Nigeria. She was appointed by the Federal Ministry of Communication Technology as part of a team member convened by the Honourable Minister of ICT to draft a comprehensive ICT policy for Nigeria.

In 2011, she joined the Central Organizing Committee of the Nigerian Economic Summit Group and accepted to become a member of the National Committee on Job Creation in Nigeria which was chaired by Aliko Dangote and inaugurated to develop an action plan for job creation in Nigeria.

Nnoli-Edozien served as the African Representative of the Bank für Orden und Mission, Germany from November 2004 to December 2005. In 2001, Nnoli-Edozien founded the Micro-enterprise Development Co-operation, MDC is a platform for evaluating international best practices in micro-finance for building self-reliant and sustainable financial intermediaries that nurture and grow small businesses into viable and socially responsible service providers.

In 1999, Nnoli-Edozien founded the Growing Businesses Foundation as a platform to support enterprise development at the Bottom of the Pyramid in Nigeria.

== Bibliography ==
- Ownership and Management Structures in the Economy: African Traditional Values Applied to Modern Issues of Sustainability and the Corporate Governance Function”, 2007 CIDJAP Printing Press,ISBN 978-8062-59-8
- Africa Fund on Sustainability Micro-finance Bank: Our Role towards Economic Development and Poverty Alleviation in Nigeria, 2005 Joint Publication, CIDJAP Press, ISBN 978-8062-54-7
- Development is about People, Business is about Ethics, 2003, CIDJAP Joint Publication, Enugu, ISBN 978-049-240-2
- Afrika in Eigener Sache: Weissheit, Kultur und Leben der Igbo (IKO Verlag fuer Interkulturelle Kommunikation, Frankfurt/London, 2003, ISBN 3-88939-691-7 Die Reihe Ezi-Muoma Afrika Verstehen Nr. 1; Herausgeber: Ike/Hoffmann
- Understanding Africa: Traditional Legal Reasoning, Jurisprudence & Justice in Igboland; (CIDJAP Joint Publication, 2001, Enugu, ISBN 978-34677-3-5)
