= Chiamaka Aniakor =

Nigerian entrepreneur

- Born: September 25, 1995 (age 30); Enugu State
- Education: Enugu State University of Science and Technology, Lagos Business School

Chiamaka Aniakor (born 25 September 1995) a Nigerian entrepreneur and SDGs advocate. She is also the founder of the Onyemaechi Memorial Foundation, a non-profit organization.

== Biography ==
Chiamaka Aniakor was born on 25 September 1995 in Enugu State, where she also hails from. She was born as the second child among four siblings into the family of Mr Ernest and Mrs Onyemaechi Aniakor. In 2022, Chiamaka earned a bachelor's degree in Anatomy from the Enugu State University of Science and Technology.

== Career ==
In 2019, Chiamaka founded the Onyemaechi Memorial Foundation, a nonprofit organization focused on welfare, healthcare advocacy and empowerment. Later, in 2023, she graduated from the Lagos Business School.

In 2023, she was appointed special adviser on social development to the Enugu West Senator, Osita Ngwu.
