= Nnamani Music Group =

Music technology company

- Type: Private
- Traded as: NMG
- Industry: Music, Entertainment, Technology
- Genre: Various
- Founded: 2023; 3 years ago
- Founders: Johnel Nnamani; Nnamani Grace Odi
- Headquarters: NG
- Area served: Worldwide
- Key people: Johnel Nnamani (CEO); Nnamani Grace Odi (co-CEO); Trinisha Browne (Head of A&R)
- Products: Music; Licensing; Audio; Marketing
- Services: Music publishing
- Website: nnamanimusicgroup.com

Nnamani Music Group (often abbreviated as NMG) is a music technology company founded in 2023 by Johnel Nnamani and Nnamani Grace Odi. The company operates as a distribution, publishing and licensing company.

The Recording Academy recognized the company in its feature on women shaping African music which highlighted its role in supporting independent artists through the work of its co-founder Nnamani Grace Odi. The company operates in Montreal, Lagos, Caribbean and more.

== History ==
=== Early history ===
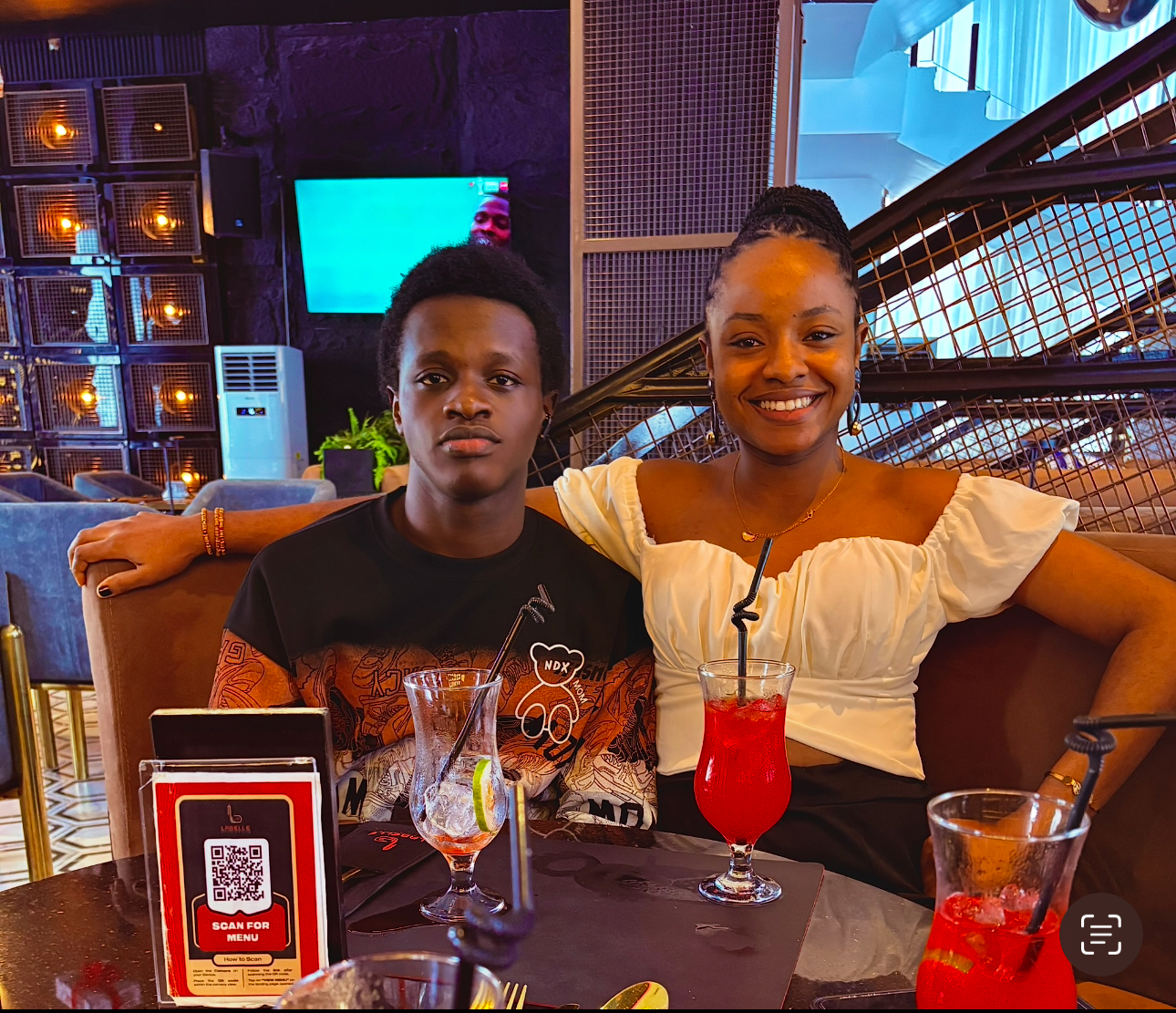
Johnel Nnamani & Nnamani Grace Odi, co-founders of Nnamani Music Group

NMG has its origins in 2023, a year before its official launch. It was co-founded by Nnamani Grace Odi and Johnel Nnamani. The company started its operations in 2023, originally oriented to providing promotion and distribution for other labels and artists internationally. In 2024, NMG was officially launched as an independent music company and started its music distribution via ONE Revolution People's Music focusing on various music genres. The company provides music distribution, publishing, licensing, and artist management services globally. Headquartered in Lagos, NMG comprises a record label, along with music publishing, licensing, and talent management divisions. It was founded to support independent artists and releases. Since its establishment, Nnamani Music Group has released a range of compilations and singles under its imprint, including Johnel’s Galactic Theme album.

Nnamani Music Group facilitates revenue collection across multiple territories by coordinating digital distribution, publishing administration, and licensing activities. This includes tracking income generated from streaming platforms, synchronization placements, and other licensed uses outside artists’ home markets. The company’s operations are oriented toward addressing gaps in cross-border royalty collection, particularly for African artists whose works are consumed internationally but whose earnings may be fragmented across jurisdictions.

=== 2025–present: Appointment of Trinisha Browne and recognition by the Recording Academy ===
NMG started its operation in Nigeria. As of 2025, the company expanded its operations in Canada, Nigeria, Caribbean and the United States.

On September 6, 2025, The Recording Academy (Grammy Awards) featured NMG through co-founder Nnamani Grace Odi in its “Women Shaping African Music” report, noting its role in supporting independent artists and expanding opportunities for African music globally. According to this report, the company serves as an “independent music company and label aimed at supporting African music, artists, and producers.” Also noting that the company provides distribution, marketing and strategic guidance to independent artists and rights owners, expanding opportunities for African artists to license their music internationally and secure more equitable agreements.

On October 22, 2025, Billboard Canada reported that Trinidadian-Canadian artist Trinisha Browne had been appointed as the first Head of A&R at Nnamani Music Group, marking the company’s expansion into the Caribbean and Canada. At the time of the appointment, co-founder Johnel Nnamani told Billboard Canada that Browne’s arrival was “a huge step toward structuring the company’s A&R foundation with both creative intuition and strategic foresight,” adding that Browne’s background in the Caribbean, Canada, and Africa would “bring an invaluable perspective to the company’s global vision.”

== See also ==
- Lists of record labels
- Music of Africa
- Independent record label
