= Morenike Molehin =

Nigerian actress and TV presenter

Molehin Morenike
- Born: Morenike Molehin; May 5, 1989 (age 37); Ijebu-Ode, Nigeria
- Education: Covenant University, University of Leicester
- Occupation: Entrepreneur
- Years active: 2013–present
- Spouse: Abayomi Oluwaseun Molehin (2011)

Morenike Molehin (born May 5, 1989) is a Nigerian entrepreneur and media personality. She is the founder of Oak and Teak and also the convener of the GWR Conference. In 2023, she won the ELOY Awards for Entrepreneur of the Year.

== Biography ==
Morenike Molehin was born on May 5, 1989, in Ijebu-Ode, Ogun State, Nigeria, to Bolajoko Abiodun and Olubunmi Ganiat Odutola, as the eldest of three siblings. Molehin commenced her formal education at St. Anthony Nursery and Primary School, and later acquired her secondary education from Dansol High School.

In 2009, she earned a Bachelor’s degree in Industrial Mathematics from Covenant University, Ota, Nigeria, and later a Master’s degree in Financial Mathematics and Computation from the University of Leicester, United Kingdom.

Between 2009 and 2010, Morenike Molehin worked at Exxon Mobil. In 2012, she became Managing Director at Newer Heights Limited in 2013, where she served until 2017.

In 2013, Molehin decided to pursue her passion and founded her own interior design company “Oak and Teak”. In 2017, she quit her job as Managing Director to focus on her company full time.

== Awards ==
In 2024, Molehin was mentioned by Gabi Magazine among the Top 100, Career Women Africa. In 2023, she won for the Eloy Awards for the Entrepreneur of the year. That same year, she was listed among the Top 100 Most Inspiring Women in Nigeria on Leading Ladies Africa.

== Personal life ==
Morenike Molehin married Abayomi Oluwaseun Molehin in August 2011. Together, they have two daughters: Oluwashindara Adaora, born on December 31, 2012, and Oluwadabira Somtochukwu, born on January 12, 2016.
