= BDGX =

Nigerian record producer and businessman

- Born: Segun Lawrence Ayeleru; Agege, Lagos State, Nigeria
- Other name: Bigdoingx
- Education: Lead City University (B.Sc. Information Resource Management); University of the People (B.S. Business Administration, BSBA)
- Occupations: Music executive; record producer; businessman; philanthropist
- Known for: Doingx Records; TYO Realtors

Segun Lawrence Ayeleru, professionally known as BDGX (Bigdoingx), is a Nigerian entrepreneur and entertainment executive associated with Doingx Records.

== Education ==
BDGX's educational background includes studies in Information Resource Management at Lead City University, Ibadan, and Business Administration at the University of the People. His academic pursuits reflect his interests in information management, entrepreneurship and business administration, particularly in relation to the management and development of creative ventures.

== Career ==
BDGX developed an interest in the Nigerian music industry, particularly in artist management, talent development and music promotion. His early involvement in entertainment focused on the business aspects of music, including artist development and the management of musical talent.

He founded Doingx Records, a Nigerian music and entertainment venture involved in artist management and talent development.

His entrepreneurial activities also extend to real estate through TYO Realtors. He is also associated with Doingx Foundation, an initiative focused on education, scholarships, skills development and youth empowerment.
