= Sydney Boisselle =

Trinidad and Tobago footballer

Personal information
- Date of birth: 19 May 2000 (age 26)
- Height: 1.60 m (5 ft 3 in)
- Positions: Midfielder; right back

Youth career
- Saint Francis High School

College career
Years	Team	Apps	(Gls)
2018–2019	York Lions	0	(0)

Senior career*
Years	Team	Apps	(Gls)
- St. Augustine FC

International career^{‡}
	Trinidad and Tobago U20	2	(0)
2019	Trinidad and Tobago	1	(0)
- * Club domestic league appearances and goals ‡ National team caps and goals as of 8 October 2019

Sydney Boisselle (born 19 May 2000) is a Canadian-raised Trinidad and Tobago footballer who plays as a midfielder for the York Lions and as a right back for the Trinidad and Tobago women's national team.

== Club career ==
Boisselle played for Trinidadian club St. Augustine FC.

== International career ==
Boisselle played for Trinidad and Tobago at senior level in the 2020 CONCACAF Women's Olympic Qualifying Championship qualification.
