= Nnamani Grace Odi =

Nigerian entrepreneur (born 2001)

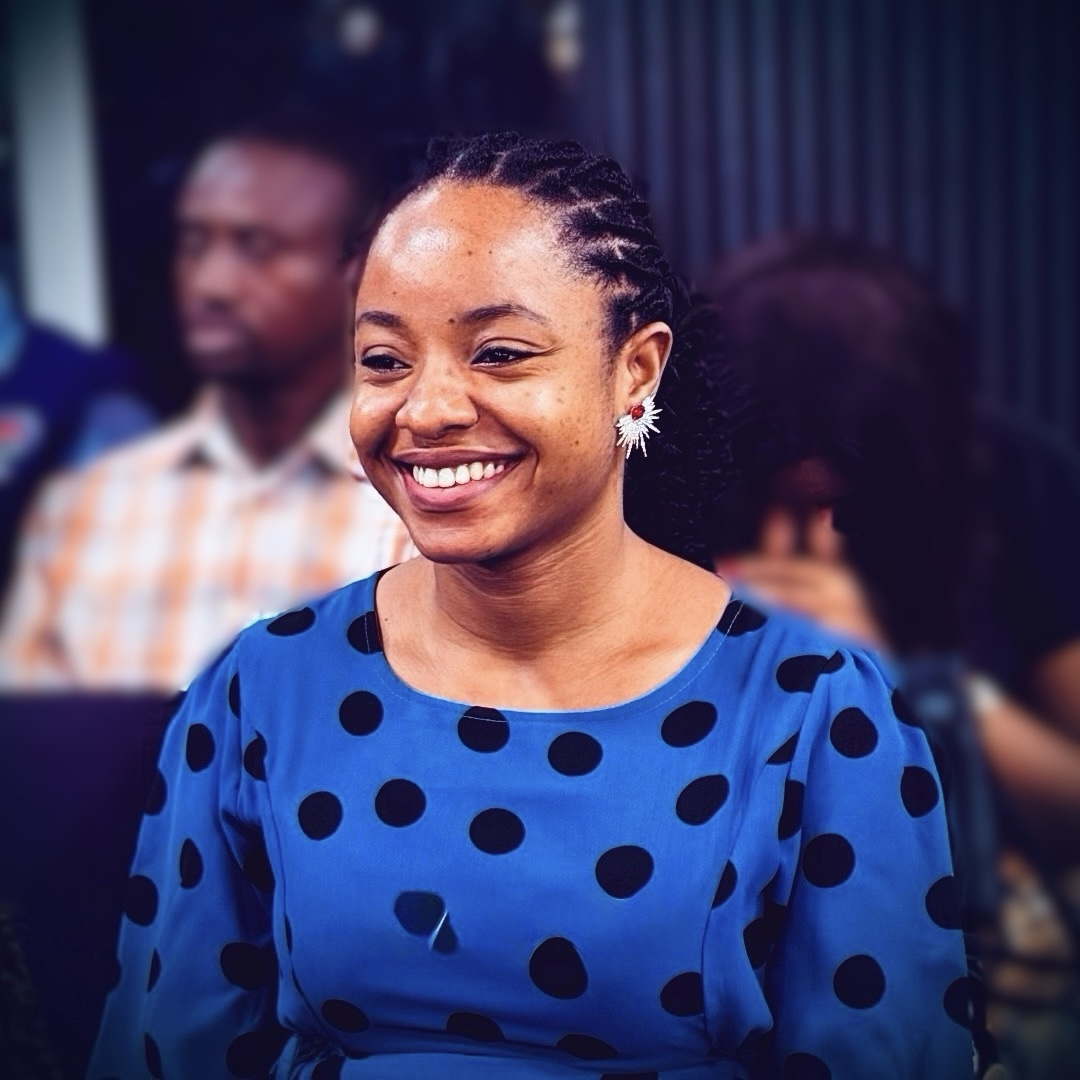
- Nnamani Grace Odi in 2026
- Born: 9 May 2001 (age 25); Lagos
- Other name: Grandi
- Education: National Open University
- Occupations: Entrepreneur; writer; media executive
- Years active: 2020–present
- Known for: Co-founding Nnamani Music Group
- Title: Record executive
- Relatives: Johnel Nnamani (Brother)

Nnamani Grace Odinakachukwu (/ˈnnɑːmɑːni/; born May 9, 2001), often referred to as Grandi, is a Nigerian entrepreneur, writer, and media executive. She is the co-founder of Nnamani Music Group, a music distribution and publishing company; she founded the multimedia company Grandihub. She has been cited by The Recording Academy as one of the women recognized for their contributions to African music.

Her professional involvement in the creative industries began while she was a student, when she started developing screenplays and engaging with digital storytelling. During this period, she worked as a script intermediary, submitting written material to established filmmakers and directors.

== Early life ==
Nnamani Grace Odi was born on May 9, 2001, in Lagos, Nigeria. She pursued her higher education at the National Open University of Nigeria, where she combined her academic studies with early involvement in creative arts and writing.

== Career ==
=== Film and writing ===
Odi began her creative work in the Nigerian film industry under the pen name "Grandi", distributing scripts to filmmakers. She has collaborated with directors including Kingsley Ogoro, Dickson Ekhaguere, Obi Emelonye and Shan George. In 2025, she published the novel The Beast of Green Manor, a fiction family saga set in Ontario. The narrative centers on the inhabitants of the titular "Green Manor." The plot focuses on the discovery of hidden family records and the subsequent impact of these revelations on the younger generation's identity and inheritance.

=== Executive ===
In 2020, she founded Grandihub, a multimedia company aimed at helping writers, filmmakers, and other creative professionals to develop, create, and distribute narrative content across formats such as film scripts, novels, and articles. Odi told the British Guardian that the high cost of concert tickets meant that many African fans were unable to attend performances by leading Afrobeats artists in their own countries and instead followed such events online. In 2023, she co-founded Nnamani Music Group, an independent music company. The company was established as an independent music group to facilitate revenue collection across multiple territories through the coordination of digital distribution, publishing administration, royalty collection, and licensing activities. Its operations include tracking income generated from streaming platforms, synchronization placements, and other licensed uses outside artists’ home markets. The company has worked with independent artists in Africa and internationally.

== Personal life ==
Grace is the sister of fellow music executive and entrepreneur Johnel Nnamani. In 2023, the siblings co-founded Nnamani Music Group.

== Recognition ==
In 2025, Odi was listed by the Recording Academy in an article featuring women involved in African music, noting her role in co-founding Nnamani Music Group and her contributions to African independent music. It highlighted her as part of a generation of women executives expanding the presence of African music globally. The article also profiled other women including Niniola, Camille Storm, Osagie Osarenkhoe, Temi Adeniji among other executives, artists, and journalists working across the continent and in the global industry.

== See also ==
- Cinema of Nigeria
- List of Nigerian entrepreneurs
- List of Nigerian writers
