= Rommel Asagwara =

Nigerian physician (born 1983)

- Born: Rommel Asagwara; December 1, 1983 (age 42); Lagos State
- Education: Louis Pasteur University
- Website: www.conciergeladoctor.com

Rommel Asagwara also known as Dr. Rommel (born December 1, 1983) is a Nigerian-American medical doctor, entrepreneur and actor. He is the founder of Concierge LA Doctor for telehealth and in-home concierge medicine with its headquarters in California United States of America . In 2023, he featured on the Nigerian television series, The Real Housewives of Lagos.

== Background ==
Asagwara was born on December 1, 1983, in Lagos State, Nigeria. Later, he relocated to France where he spent part of his adolescent and early adult life. In 2014, he graduated from the Louis Pasteur University, France with a Doctor of Medicine.

== Career ==
Asagwara served as a resident physician in General Medicine at the Pitie Salpetriere Hospital in Paris, France, and later, Sud Francilien Hospital. In 2016, he became a resident physician at the University of Kansas Medical Center, Kansas City, United States.

In 2020, he founded Dream Weight Botox Clinic, a weight loss and cosmetic clinic. He is a member of the American Academy of Family Physicians and the American Board of Obesity Medicine.

In 2025, he moved to California where he founded Concierge LA Doctor providing in-home premium medical services to patients in the greater California area.

== Filmography ==
- The Real Housewives of Lagos (2023).
