= Thomas Etuh =

- Born: December 1965 (age 60); Kogi State, Nigeria
- Occupations: Businessman, entrepreneur
- Known for: Prominent Nigerian entrepreneur and financier
- Spouse: Jennifer Ramatu Etuh (d. 2020)
- Children: 4

Thomas Akoh Etuh is a Nigerian businessman and entrepreneur from Kogi state, Nigeria. He is known for his investments in various sectors including agriculture, fertilizer production, banking, telecommunications, and aviation. He is the founder of TAK Continental Limited and has held leadership positions in several major Nigerian companies.

== Early life ==
Etuh was born in Zaria, Kaduna state. After his primary and secondary education, he obtained a Diploma in Banking from Ahmadu Bello University, Zaria, an Advanced Diploma in Public Administration from the University of Jos and a Postgraduate Diploma in Management from Abubakar Tafawa Balewa University, Bauchi. He also holds an MBA from the Business School of Netherlands. He is an alumnus of the Lagos Business School, the IESE Business School and the London Business School.

== Career ==
=== Business ventures ===
Etuh began his business career in commodity trading in northern Nigeria in the early 1980s, dealing in agricultural produce like grains, chilli peppers, palm oil and yams. His business interests have also included salt, cement importation and automobile spare parts importation.

=== Fertilizer industry ===
In the late 1980s, Etuh entered the fertilizer business, eventually becoming a major importer and distributor in Nigeria. His company TAK Continental Limited grew to be one of the largest fertilizer companies in Africa by the mid-2000s. In 2007, he acquired the Funtua Fertilizer and Chemical Company. Etuh played a key role in Nigeria's Presidential Fertilizer Initiative under President Muhammadu Buhari's administration and became the inaugural president of the Fertilizers Producers & Suppliers Association of Nigeria (FEPSAN). He became the Chairman of Notore Chemical Industries Plc in 2024.

=== Banking sector ===
In 2014, Etuh became involved with Unity Bank, initially as vice chairman and later as chairman in 2015. He led efforts to address the bank's financial challenges, including dealing with significant non-performing loans inherited from legacy banks.

=== Telecommunications ===
In 2021, Etuh was involved in Mafab Communications' successful bid for a 5G spectrum license in Nigeria. He later acquired a majority stake in 9mobile, becoming its largest shareholder and its chairman.

=== Other ventures ===
Etuh's business interests have also included cement importation, automobile spare parts importation, and briefly owning an airline called Associated Aviation in the late 2000s.

== Challenges and controversies ==
Throughout his career, Etuh has faced various business challenges and setbacks, including losses in commodity exports due to inexperience, difficulties in the cement importation business due to regulatory changes, and controversies surrounding Unity Bank's financial situation and debt resolution processes as well as Mafab's dormant license.

== Personal life ==
He was married to Jennifer Ramatu Etuh who died in 2020 and has four children, Emmanuel, Yusuf, David, and Daniel.
