= Johnel Nnamani =

Nigerian entrepreneur and record producer

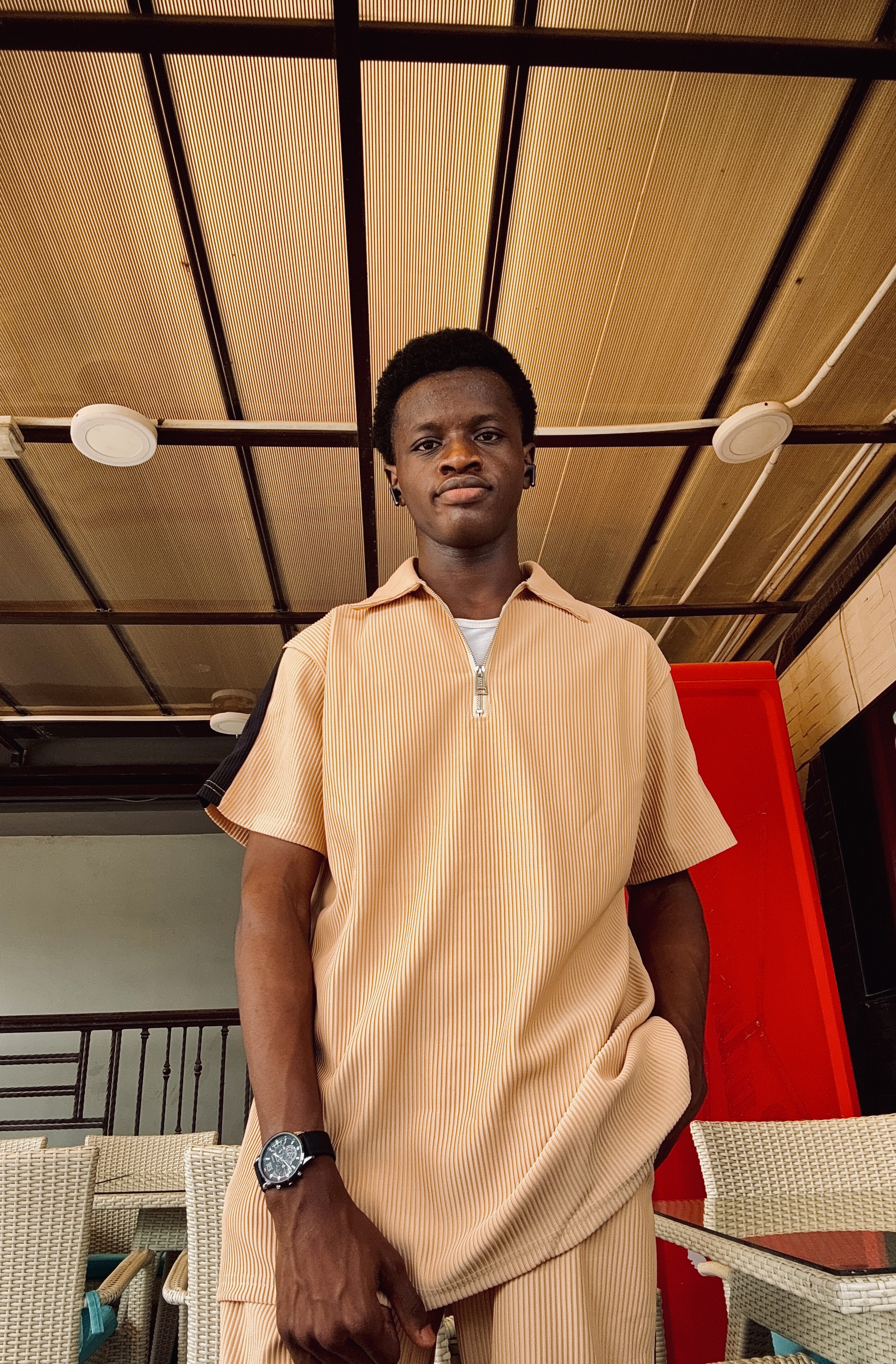
- Occupations: Entrepreneur; Record producer
- Years active: 2020–present
- Known for: Co-founder & CEO of Nnamani Music Group
- Relatives: Nnamani Grace Odi (sister)

Johnel Nnamani is a Nigerian entrepreneur and record producer. He is the co-founder and chief executive officer of Nnamani Music Group, a music distribution and publishing company.

== Career ==
Johnel began his career as an independent musician under the stage name Johnel NG and started releasing music in the early 2020s.

In 2023, Johnel co-founded Nnamani Music Group (NMG) with Nnamani Grace Odi, his elder sister who had worked as a filmmaker, media and entertainment executive at her multimedia platform Grandihub. Under Johnel's leadership, Nnamani Music Group expanded from a record label service into a tech integrated music company encompassing distribution, music publishing, sync licensing, and content production.

In October 2025, Billboard Canada reported that Trinidadian-Canadian music executive Trinisha Browne was appointed as the first Head of A&R at Nnamani Music Group. According to the publication, co-founder Johnel Nnamani stated that Browne’s appointment was part of the company’s efforts to develop its A&R structure and cited her experience across the Caribbean, Canada, and Africa as relevant to its international activities.
