= Liman =

Liman may refer to:

== Places ==
- Liman, Azerbaijan, a city in Lankaran Rayon
- Liman, Davachi, a village in Shabran Rayon, Azerbaijan
- Liman, Israel, a moshav in northern Israel
- Liman, Russia, name of several inhabited localities in Russia
- Liman, Novi Sad, a quarter of the city Novi Sad, Serbia
- The Russian-language name of Lyman, Ukraine

== People ==
- Abubakar Liman (born 1964), Nigerian air vice-marshal
- Arthur L. Liman (1932-1997), American lawyer
- Blessing Liman (born 1984), Nigerian military pilot
- Doug Liman (born 1965), American film director and producer
- Ibrahim Alhaji Liman (born 1960s), Controller General of Fire Service of Nigeria
- Lewis J. Liman (born 1960), American judge
- Mohammed Tukur Liman (active from 1999), Nigerian politician
- Muhammad Sanusi Liman (born c. 1970), Nigerian physicist
- Rosli Liman (born 1969), Bruneian footballer
- Liman Ibrahim (active from 2013), Nigerian member of Boku Haram
- Otto Liman von Sanders, German general

== Other ==
- Liman Substage, a subdivision of the Illinoian Stage in geochronology
- Liman (landform), a type of lagoon or estuary, most prominent on the coast of the Black Sea
- Liman irrigation system, a system of collecting runoff water to sustain small tree groves in deserts
- Treaty of Balta Liman, a commercial treaty signed in 1838 between the Ottoman Empire and the United Kingdom
- Russian ship Liman, an intelligence ship sunk in 2017
