= Sarvan =

Sarwan may refer to:

== Places ==
=== Azerbaijan ===
- Sarvan, Davachi
- Sarvan, Salyan

=== Georgia ===
- Marneuli, formerly Sarvan

=== India ===
- Sarvan, Madhya Pradesh

=== Iran ===
- Servan

=== Tajikistan ===
- Sarvan, Tajikistan

== Art and entertainment ==
- Sarvan (comics), a Spanish comics series
