= Mohammed Marwana =

Nigerian Jihadist

Mohammed Marwana is a member of the Boko Haram terrorist sect. In August 2013, he claimed to have taken leadership of the sect from Abubakar Shekau, contradicting reports from Boko Haram's spiritual leader, Imam Liman Ibrahim that Shekau had been killed and Abu Zamira appointed to lead the militant organization. He claimed to have been responsible for initiating peace talks between the Nigerian government and Boko Haram.

== Kano attacks ==
Mohammed Marwana cited the August 2013 Kano Bombings as evidence that he was in control of Boko Haram. He declared that "I personally instructed the attack in Kano to prove to the world that, I am the real leader of Boko Haram because there have been retrogressive forces on the issue of dialogue, who kept doubting my leadership in the sect. I told them ahead that there will be attack, and it has happened. It is a warning, and we need to say again that we carried out the attacks in Kano."

== On Abubakar Shekau ==
Despite reports by Boko Haram's spiritual leader, Imam Liman Ibrahim, and declarations from Abu Zamira that Abubakar Shekau had been killed, Marwana declared that Shekau had only been deposed. Marwana asserted in August 2013 that "Shekau is alive contrary to speculations, except that he lost leadership of the sect. I will not tell you where he is, but he is alive... except if he died while I am talking."

== See also ==
- Islamism
- Jihadism
- Islamist insurgency in Nigeria
- Sharia in Nigeria
- Slavery in 21st-century Islamism
