= Andrew Haruna =

Nigerian academic

Prof. Andrew Haruna

Vice-Chancellor of Federal University Gashua
- In office February 2016 – February 2021
- Preceded by: Professor Shehu Abdul Rahman
- Succeeded by: Prof. Maimuna Waziri

Personal details
- Born: Andrew Haruna; 4 April 1957 (age 69) Bauchi, Bauchi State, Nigeria
- Education: University of Maiduguri; University of London
- Occupation: Academic; author
- Profession: Linguist

Andrew Haruna (born 4 April 1957) is a Nigerian academic. He is a professor of linguistics and Nigerian languages. He served as the second vice chancellor of the Federal University of Gashua (2016-2021).

== Early life and education ==
Haruna was born in 1957 in Bauchi State. He attended Gar Local Education Authority Primary School, Bauchi, and Government College Maiduguri, Borno State (1971 to 1975). He attended the University of Maiduguri, where he earned a BA (Honors) in Linguistics in 1981. He then proceeded to the University of London, where he obtained his Master of Arts (MA) and a PhD in 1985 and 1990, respectively.

== Career ==
He was employed by the University of Maiduguri in 1982 as a Graduate Assistant. In 2006, he was promoted to professor by the institution's management. Haruna was appointed the second substantive vice-chancellor of Federal University, Gashua, Yobe State, in February 2016 by the administration of President Muhammadu Buhari, a position he held until February 2021.

In November 2024, he assumed office as the Secretary-General of the Committee of Vice Chancellors of Nigerian Universities (CVCNU). Earlier, the Board of Trustees of Bingham University, Karu, Nasarawa State, appointed him as its Pro-Chancellor and later as the Vice-President of the Nigerian Academy of Letters.

== Nomination and awards ==
As a postgraduate student in the United Kingdom, Andrew Haruna won the University of London Laura Soames Prize for the best PhD in Phonetics and another award from the British Science Academy. He won the most outstanding plenipotentiary for the Kwame Nkrumah leadership award 2016–2017.
