= Mohammed Isa Kida =

Nigerian academic

4th Vice-Chancellor of Federal University, Lafia
- Assuming office 11 February 2026
- Succeeding: Shehu Abdul Rahman

Personal details
- Born: 10 November 1967 (age 58) Hawul, Borno State, Nigeria
- Education: University of Maiduguri; University of Lagos
- Occupation: Academic, Accountant
- Known for: Vice-Chancellor, Federal University Lafia

Mohammed Isa Kida (born 10 November 1967) is a Nigerian academic, accountant and university administrator who serves as the 4th Vice-Chancellor of the Federal University of Lafia. He was appointed in October 2025 and assumed office on 11 February 2026, succeeding Shehu Abdul Rahman.

== Early life and education ==
Kida was born on 10 November 1967 in Hawul Local Government Area of Borno State, Nigeria. He attended Bariki Primary School in Biu and later Comprehensive Secondary School, Waka-Biu. He obtained a Bachelor of Science (B.Sc.) in Accountancy from the University of Maiduguri in 1994, a Master of Science (M.Sc.) in Accounting from the University of Lagos in 1997, and a Doctor of Philosophy (Ph.D.) in Accountancy from the University of Maiduguri in 2008.

== Academic career ==
Professor Kida has held teaching and administrative positions at several Nigerian universities, including the University of Maiduguri, Yobe State University, Nasarawa State University, Keffi, Federal University Wukari, and the American University of Nigeria, Yola.

At the Federal University of Lafia, he served as Dean of the Faculty of Management Sciences before his appointment as Vice-Chancellor.

He is an Associate Member of the Chartered Institute of Taxation of Nigeria, a Certified National Accountant (CNA), and a Fellow of the Institute of Industrialists and Corporate Administrators.
