= Maimuna Waziri =

Nigerian professor of chemistry and VC

3rd Vice-Chancellor of Federal University, Gashua
- Incumbent
- Assumed office January 16, 2021
- Preceded by: Andrew Haruna

Personal details
- Born: Maimuna Waziri
- Profession: academic

Maimuna Waziri is a Nigerian professor of chemistry and the third Vice-Chancellor of Federal University, Gashua. She was appointed in 2021 after the fifth council meeting of the university.

== Career ==
Her emergence as the third VC of Federal University of Gashua was after competing with 47 professors in the school, 25 were interrogated by the council and she was appointed by the council from the three best candidates as the first female Vice-Chancellor of Federal University of Gashua. In 2023, Maimuna as the Vice-Chancellor of FUG chaired the appointment of Ibrahim Ahmed Jajere and Mohammed Attai Yakubu as the Deputy Vice-Chancellors of Academics and Administration of the school, respectively.
