= Aliyu Shugaba =

Nigerian academic and university administrator

Prof. Aliyu Shugaba

Former vice-chancellor University of Maiduguri
- In office 3 June 2019 – 3 June 2024
- Preceded by: Ibrahim Abubakar Njodi
- Succeeded by: Mohammed Laminu Mele

Personal details
- Born: Aliyu Shugaba; 4 April 1963 (age 63) Buratai, Borno State, Nigeria
- Education: University of Maiduguri; Ahmadu Bello University
- Occupation: Academic
- Profession: Biochemist

Aliyu Shugaba (born 4 April 1963) is a Nigerian academic, professor of biochemistry who is the former vice-chancellor of University of Maiduguri in Borno State, Nigeria. prior to his appointment he was the deputy vice chancellor academic services of the university.

== Early life and education ==
Aliyu Shugaba was born in 1963 in Buratai village of Biu local government area, Borno State. Shugaba started his early childhood education at Buratai Primary School in 1970, after his completion in 1976 he then proceeded to Government Science Secondary School Bama and graduated in 1981. Shugaba was admitted into University of Maiduguri in 1982 and went on to obtain his BSc biochemistry in 1986. Shugaba also attended Ahmadu Bello University. Zaria, where he obtained his MSc and PhD in biochemistry between 1995 and 2005 respectively.

== Career ==
Shugaba is an academician and has lectured students at different levels for over twenty years.
