= Mohammed Laminu Mele =

Nigerian academic

Vice-Chancellor of University of Maiduguri
- Incumbent
- Assumed office 18 September 2024
- Preceded by: Aliyu Shugaba

Personal details
- Education: University of Maiduguri
- Occupation: Academic
- Profession: Linguist

Mohammed Laminu Mele is a Nigerian professor of English and Linguistics and the current Vice-Chancellor of the University of Maiduguri. He assumed this position on 18 September 2024, following his appointment by the institution's Governing Council. Prior to this, he served as an acting Vice-Chancellor from 3 June 2024, succeeding Aliyu Shugaba.

His scholarly contributions include works such as Kanuri Proverbs: Metaphoric Conceptualization of a Cultural Discourse and Nigerian Languages and Conflict Resolution: The Case for Proverbs and Figurative Expressions, both of which have been published in several international journals.

== See also ==
- University of Maiduguri
- List of vice-chancellors of Nigerian universities
