= Federal University of Lafia =

Public university in Lafia, Nigeria

- Other name: Fulafia
- Motto: Integrity, Innovation and Excellence
- Type: Public
- Established: 2011
- Accreditation: NUC
- Affiliations: NUC, ASUU, NASU
- Religious affiliation: Nonsectarian
- Budget: ₦ 9,270,900,581.00 (2025)
- Chancellor: Abubakar Isa Ahmadu
- Vice-Chancellor: Mohammed Isa Kida
- Students: 22,805 (2025)
- Undergraduates: 22,029 (2025)
- Postgraduates: 776
- Location: Lafia, Nasarawa State, Nigeria; 8.5060°N 8.5227°E
- Campus: Rural
- Colors: Yellow and gold
- Website: fulafia.edu.ng

The Federal University of Lafia (formerly Federal University, Lafia) is a public university in Lafia, the capital of Nasarawa State, Nigeria. It was established on 9 February 2011 as one of nine new federal universities created under the Federal Government’s university expansion programme to increase access to higher education.

The university commenced academic activities in September 2012 with new students that made up the first set of students to be trained by the university Vice Chancellor, Prof. Ekanem Ikpi Braide.

In October 2025, Professor Mohammed Isa Kida was appointed as the Vice-Chancellor of the university for a five-year term, succeeding Professor Shehu Abdul Rahman. His appointment took effect on 11 February 2026.

== Site ==
Initially, the university was to be sited along Jos road in Lafia metropolis and it was meant to begin operation using the facilities of the College of Agriculture in Lafia, however, the university's temporary site was changed to Obi road outside Lafia metropolis. In 2015, the university began relocating to its permanent location on 206 hectares of land provided by the Nasarawa State Government along the Lafia-Markudi Road in Lafia. By 2018, the central administration and the majority of faculties had successfully relocated to the university's permanent site, with the exception of two faculties. The university has an intranet for its own use.

== Faculties and Departments ==
Federal University of Lafia has multiple faculties and academic departments offering undergraduate and professional programmes. These include:

S/No.	Faculty	Department
1.	Agriculture	Agricultural Economics and Extension; Agronomy; Animal Science; Aquaculture; Fishery; Doctor of Veterinary Medicine (D.V.M)
2.	Arts	Creative and Visual Arts; English; French; History and International Studies; Theatre and Media Arts
3.	College of Medicine	Anatomy; Medical Laboratory Science; Nursing Science; Physiology; Medicine and Surgery (MBBS); Doctor of Pharmacy (Pharm.D.); Nutrition and Dietetics
4.	Computing	Computer Science; Cyber Security; Information Technology
5.	Physical Sciences	Chemistry; Geography; Mathematics; Physics; Statistics
6.	Social Sciences	Economics; Mass Communication; Philosophy; Political Science; Sociology
7.	Environmental Sciences	Quantity Surveying; Urban and Regional Planning
8.	Law	Bachelor of Laws (LL.B)
9.	Management Science	
10.	Medical Laboratory Science	
11.	Nursing	
12.	Pharmaceutical Science	
13.	Education	
14.	Radiography and Applied Health Sciences	
15.	Basic Clinical Sciences	
16.	Basic Medical Sciences	
17.	Clinical Sciences	
18.	Veterinary	
19.	Life Sciences	Zoology; Botany; Microbiology; Plant Science And Biotechnolgy; Science Laboratory Technology; Biochemistry
20.	College of Health Sciences	
21.	Environmental Design	
22.	College of Postgraduate Studies	
23.	School of Basic and Remedial Studies	

The university has continued to expand its academic offerings following approvals from the National Universities Commission (NUC). In 2025, the NUC approved six new full-time academic programmes for the university to commence in the 2025/2026 academic session, namely Bachelor of Laws (LL.B), Doctor of Pharmacy (Pharm.D.), Bachelor of Science in Quantity Surveying, Bachelor of Science in Urban and Regional Planning, Bachelor of Science in Nutrition and Dietetics, and Doctor of Veterinary Medicine (D.V.M).

== Vice-Chancellors ==
- Professor Ekanem Ikpi Braide: 2012–2016
- Professor Muhammad Sanusi Liman: 2016-2021
- Professor Shehu Abdul Rahman: 2021-2026
- Professor Mohammed Isa Kida: 2026–present

== Gallery ==
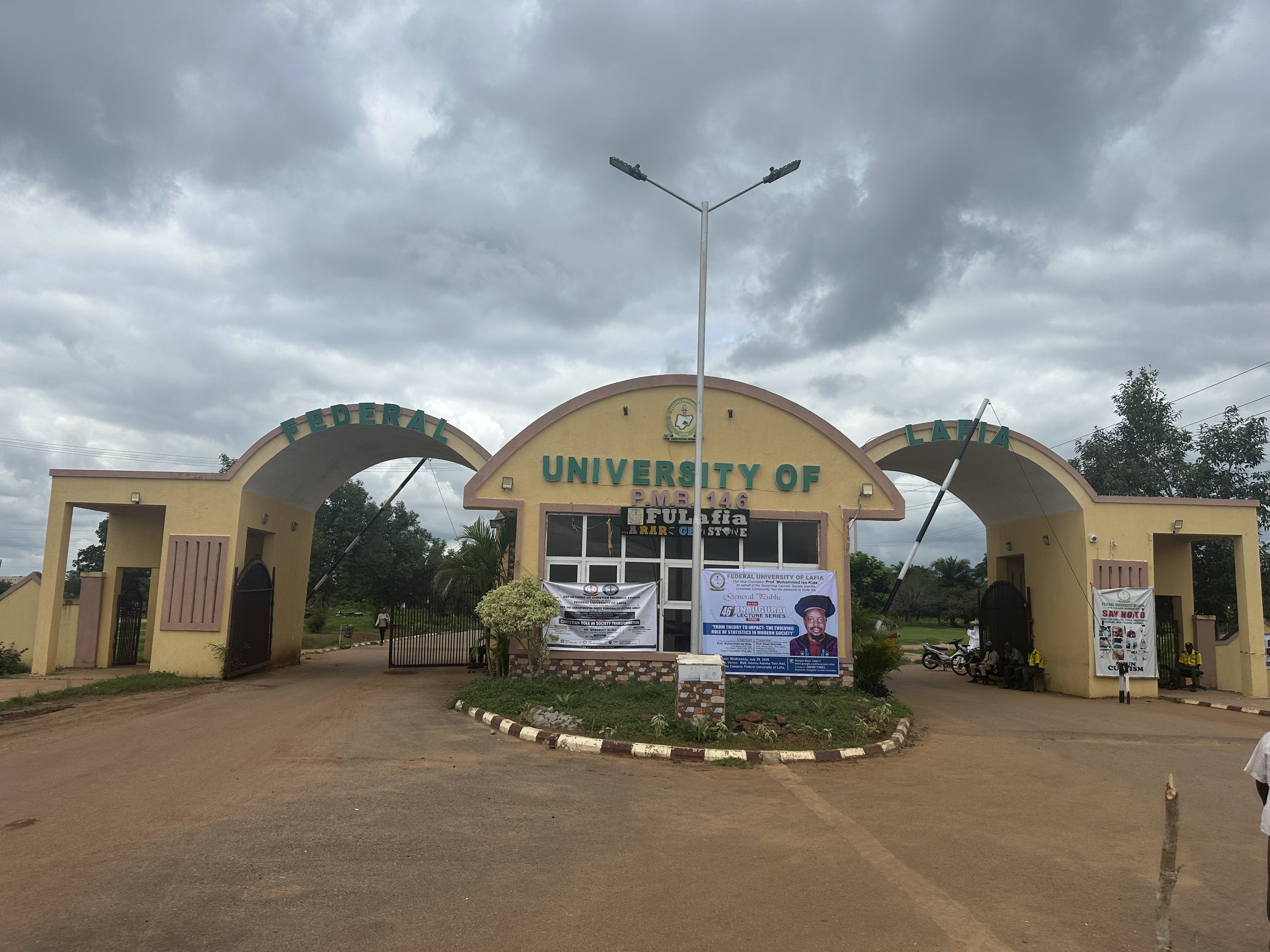
Permanent site campus main gate

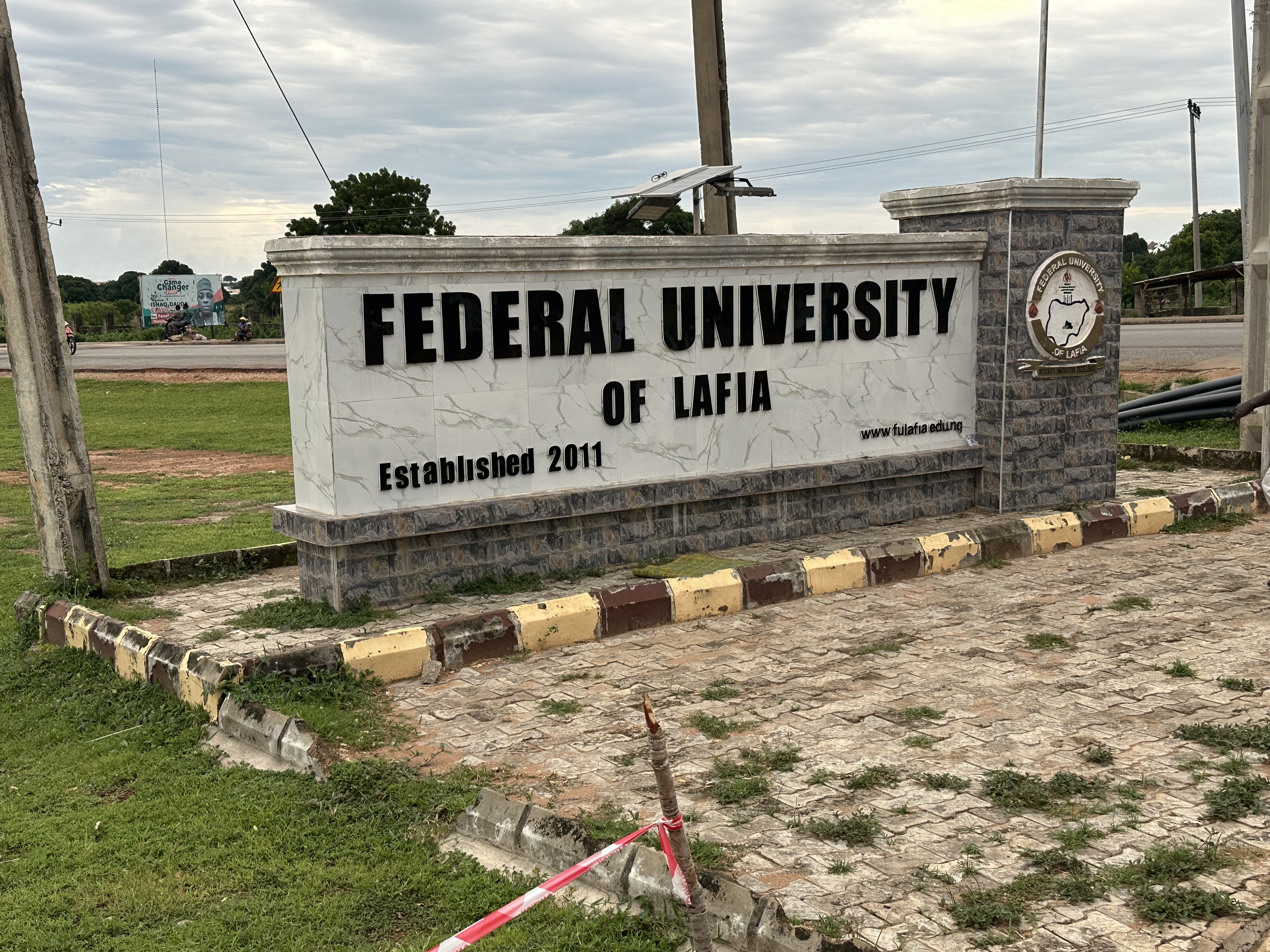
FULAFIA Signpost

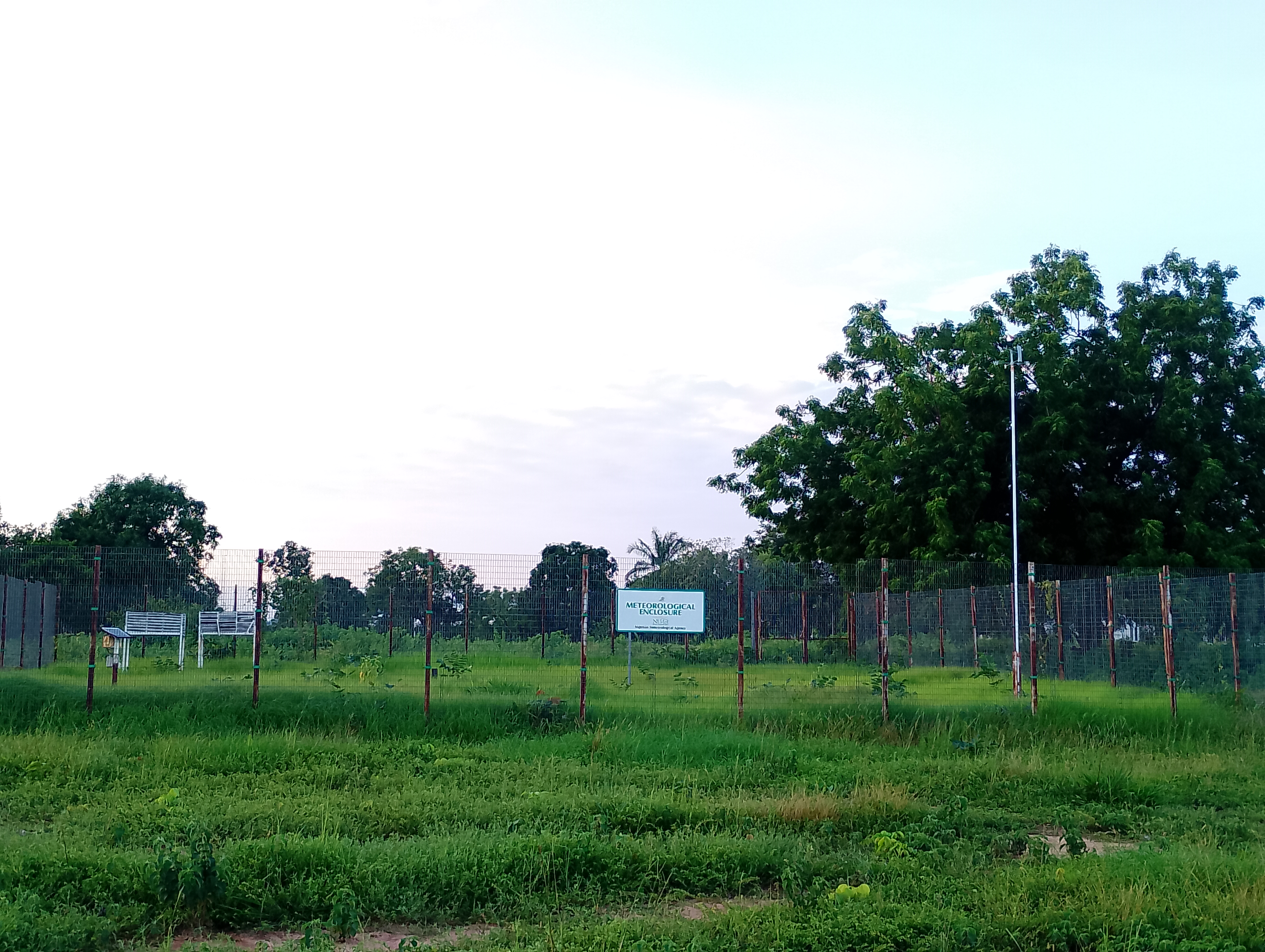
METEOROLOGICAL ENCLOSURE

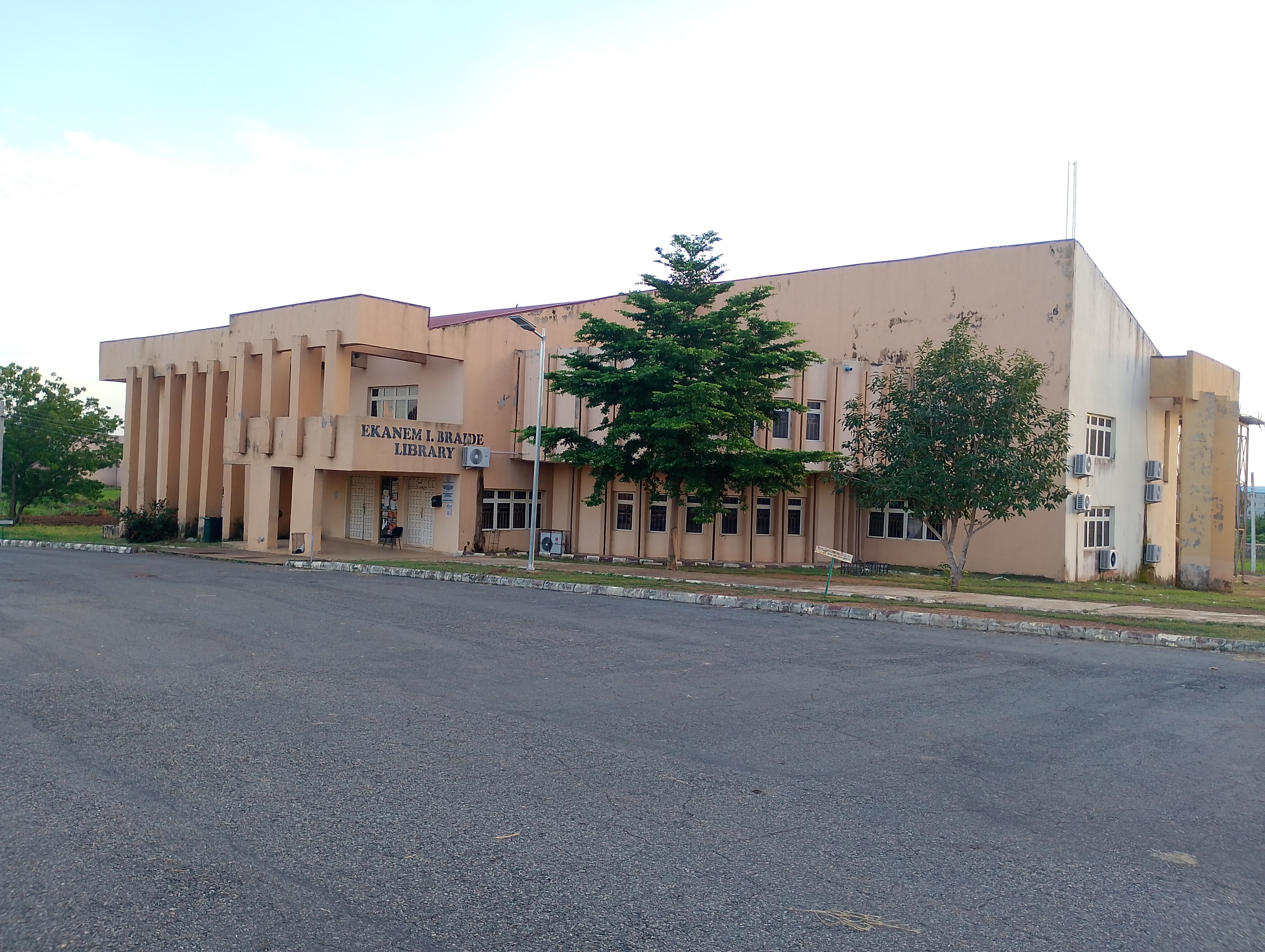
FuLafia's Library Permanent

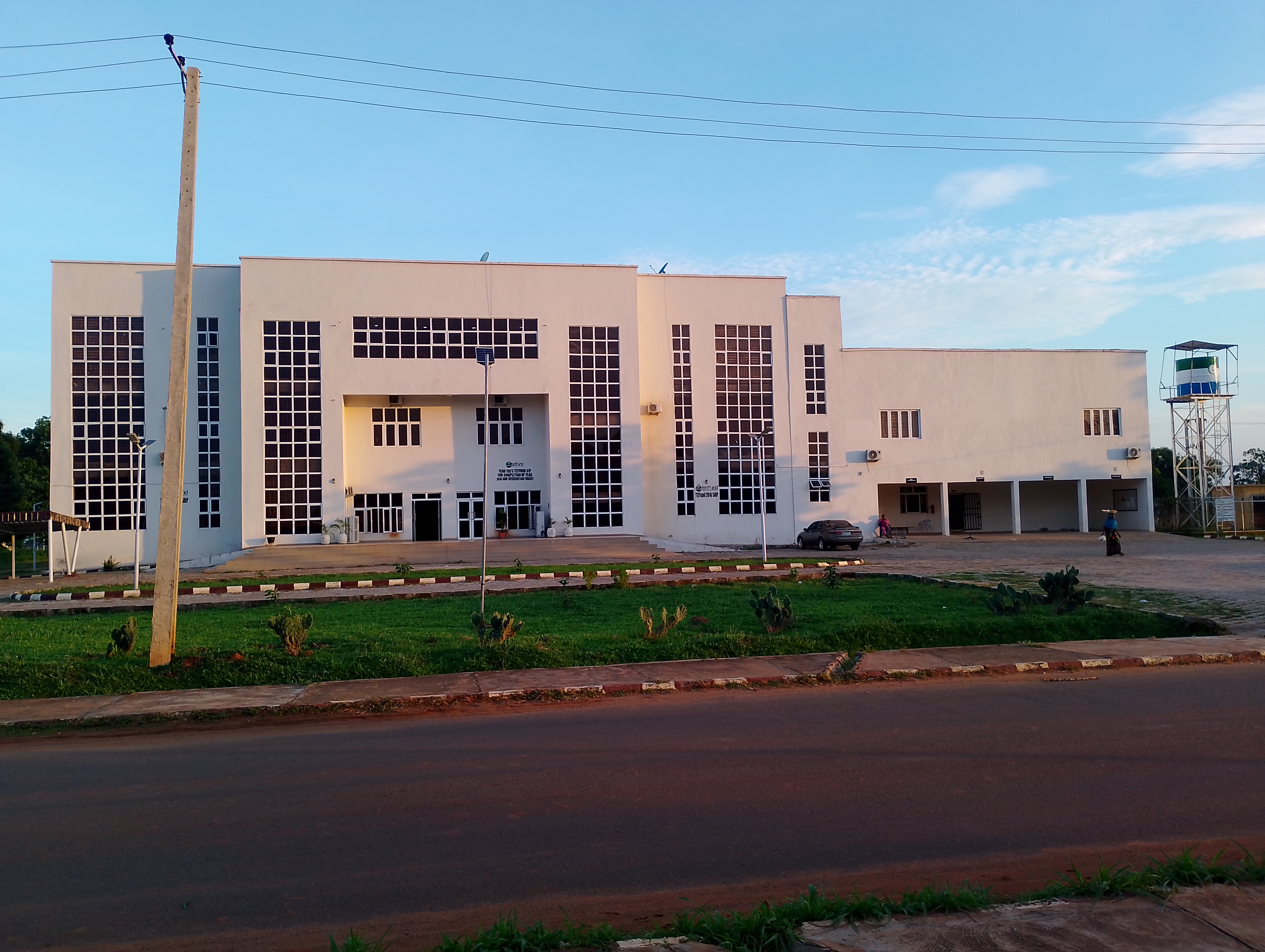
FULAFIA Senate Building Popularly known as White House

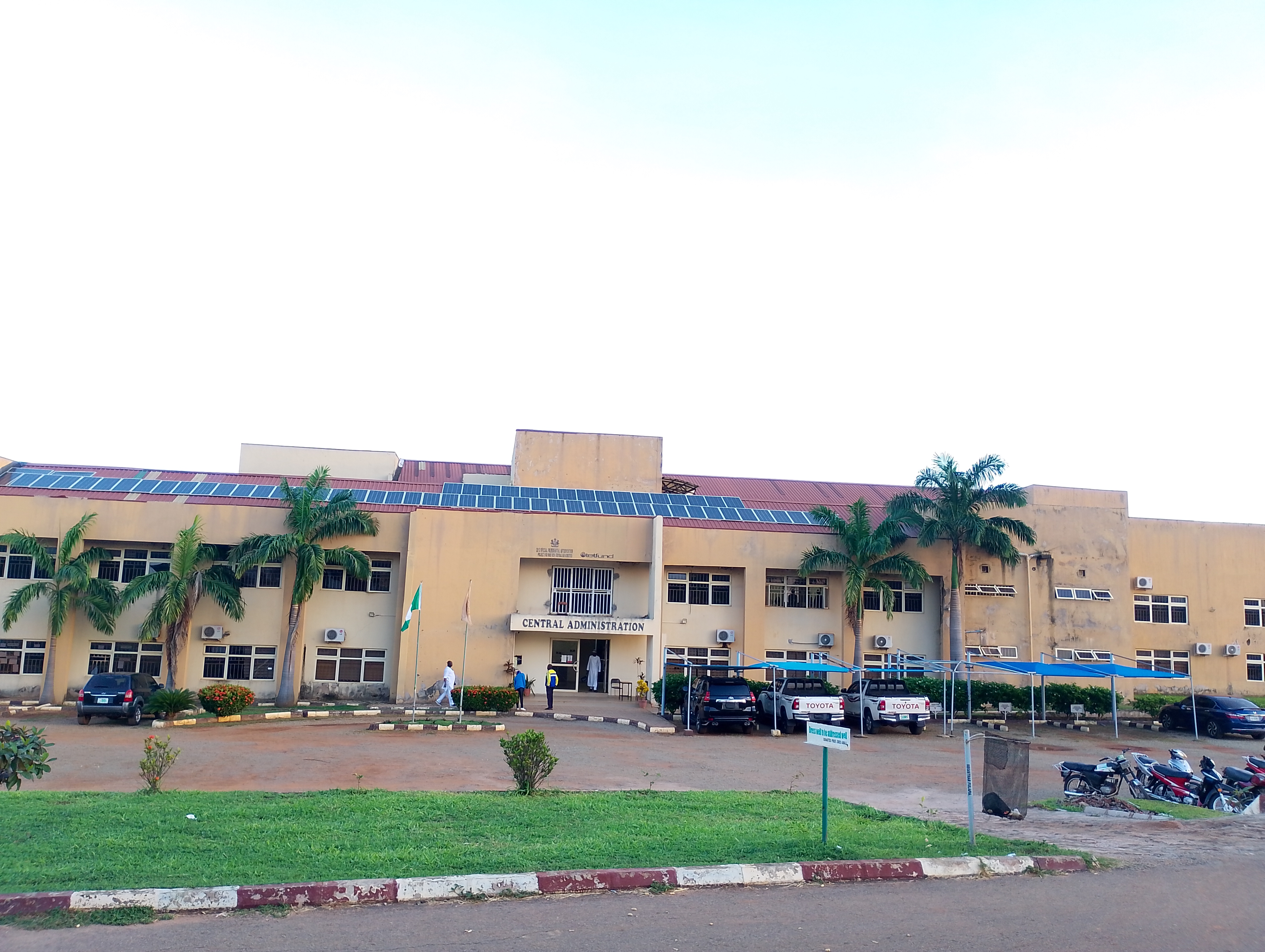
Central Administration Building

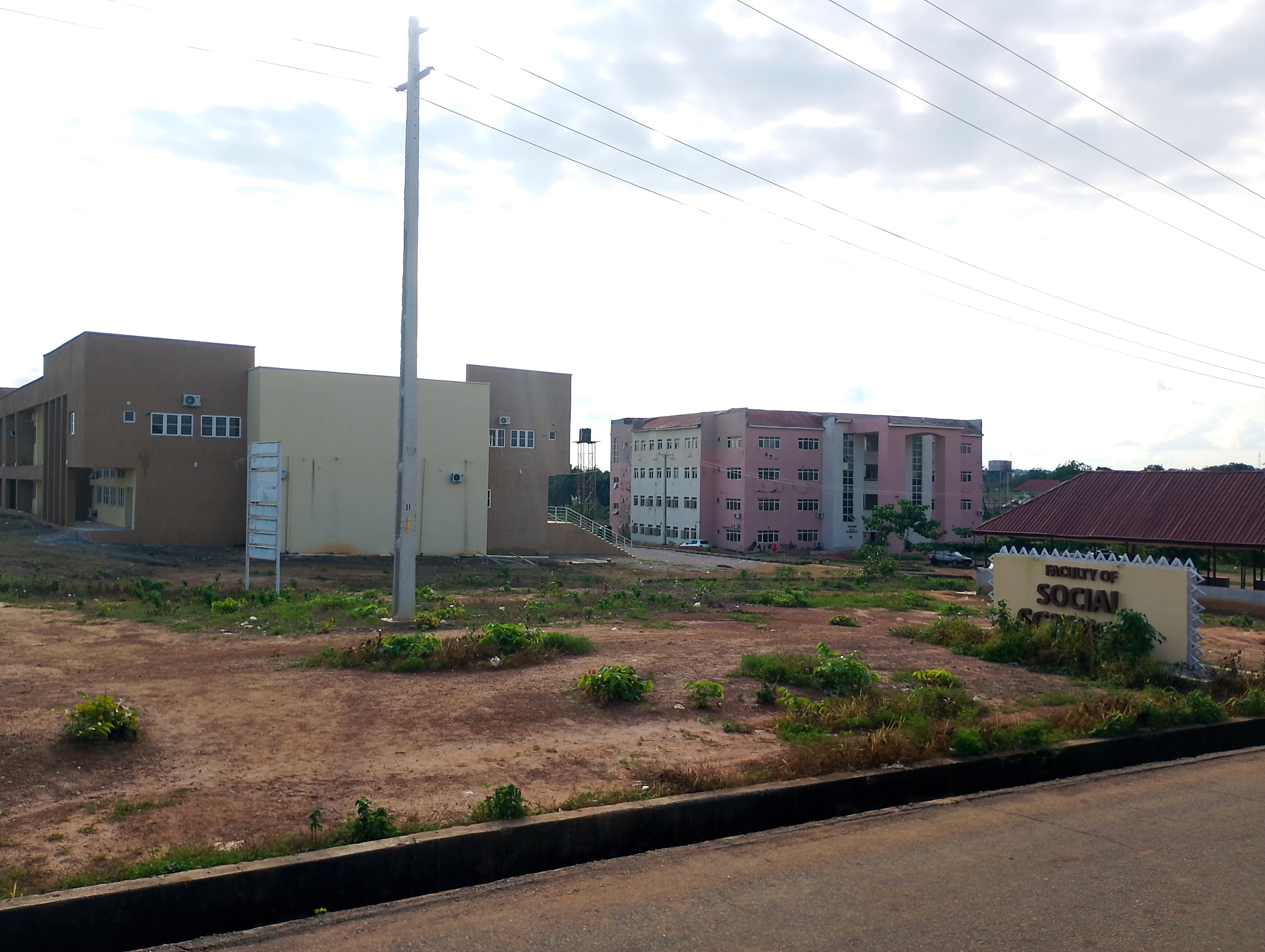
Faculty of Social Science building, Permanent Site

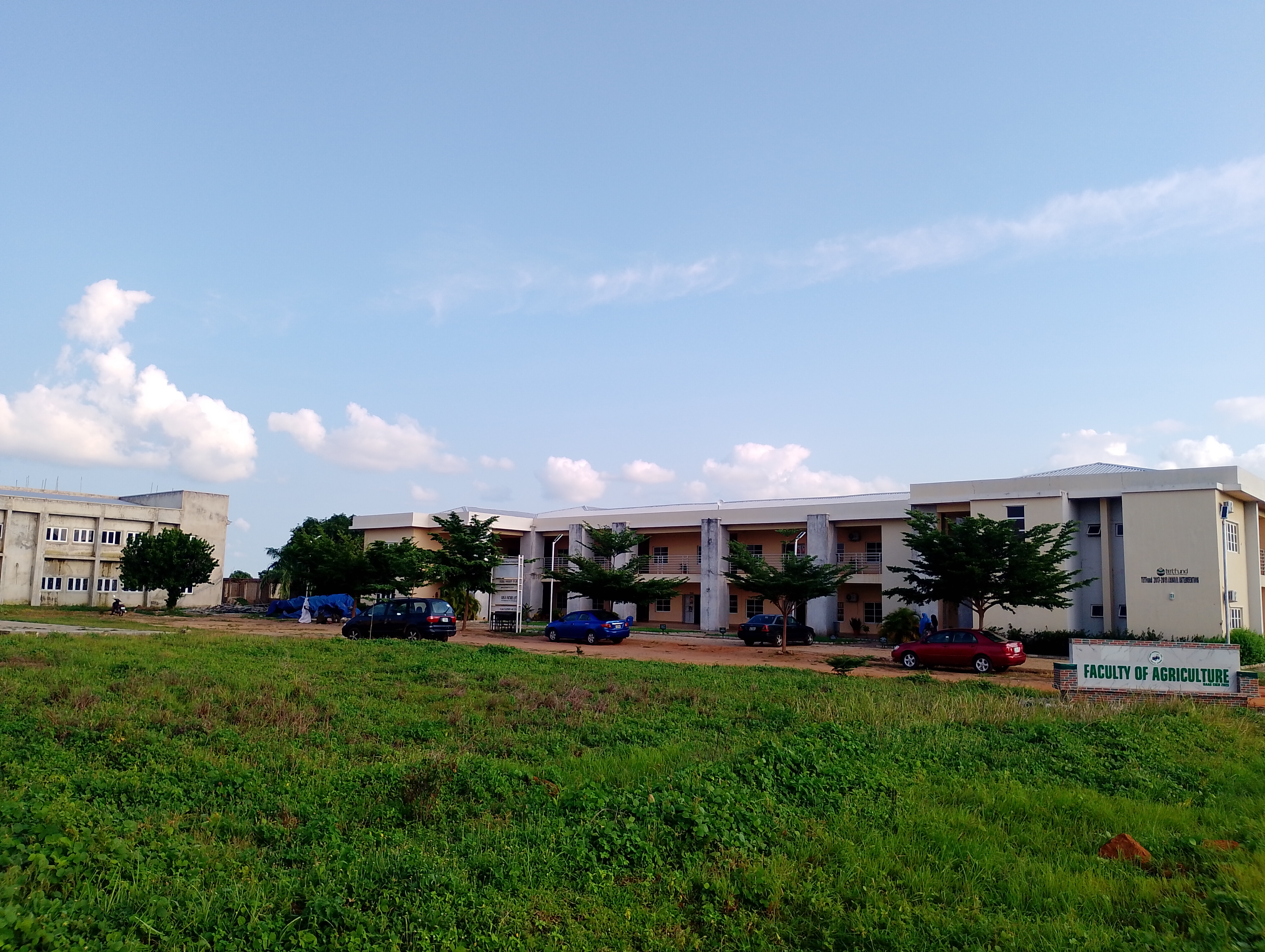
Faculty of Agriculture

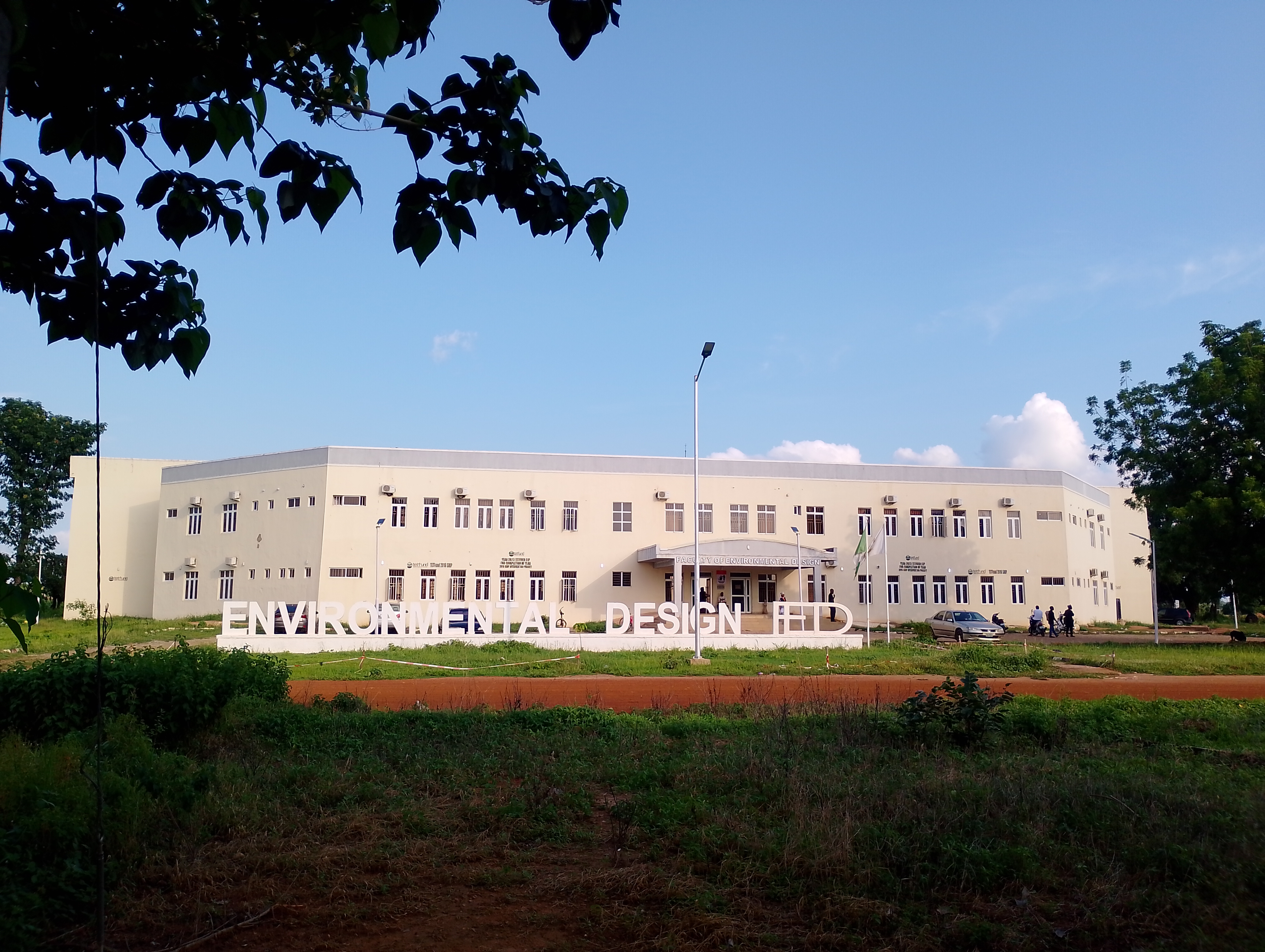
Faculty of Environment Design

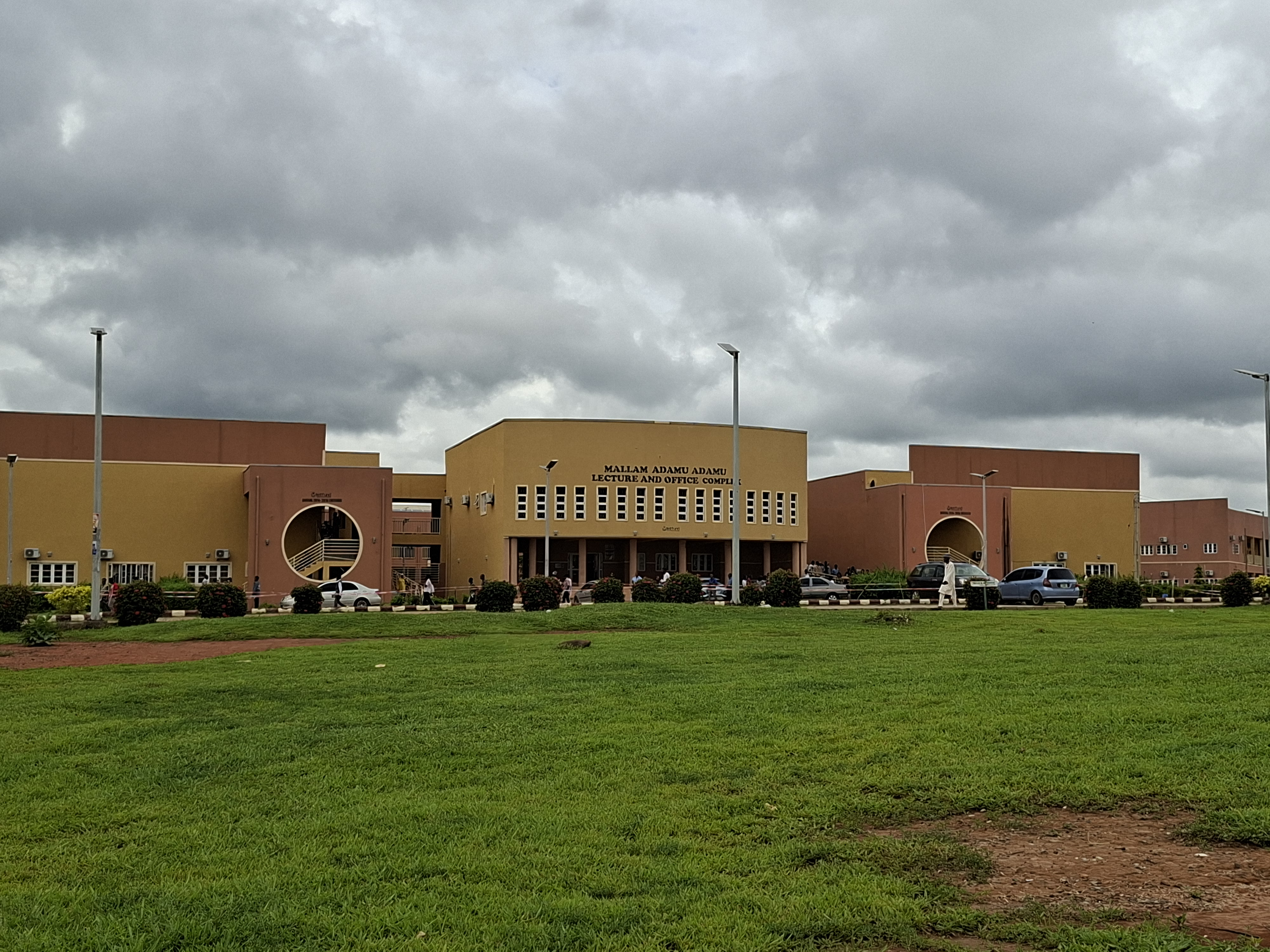
Mallam Adamu Adamu Lectures and Offices Complex

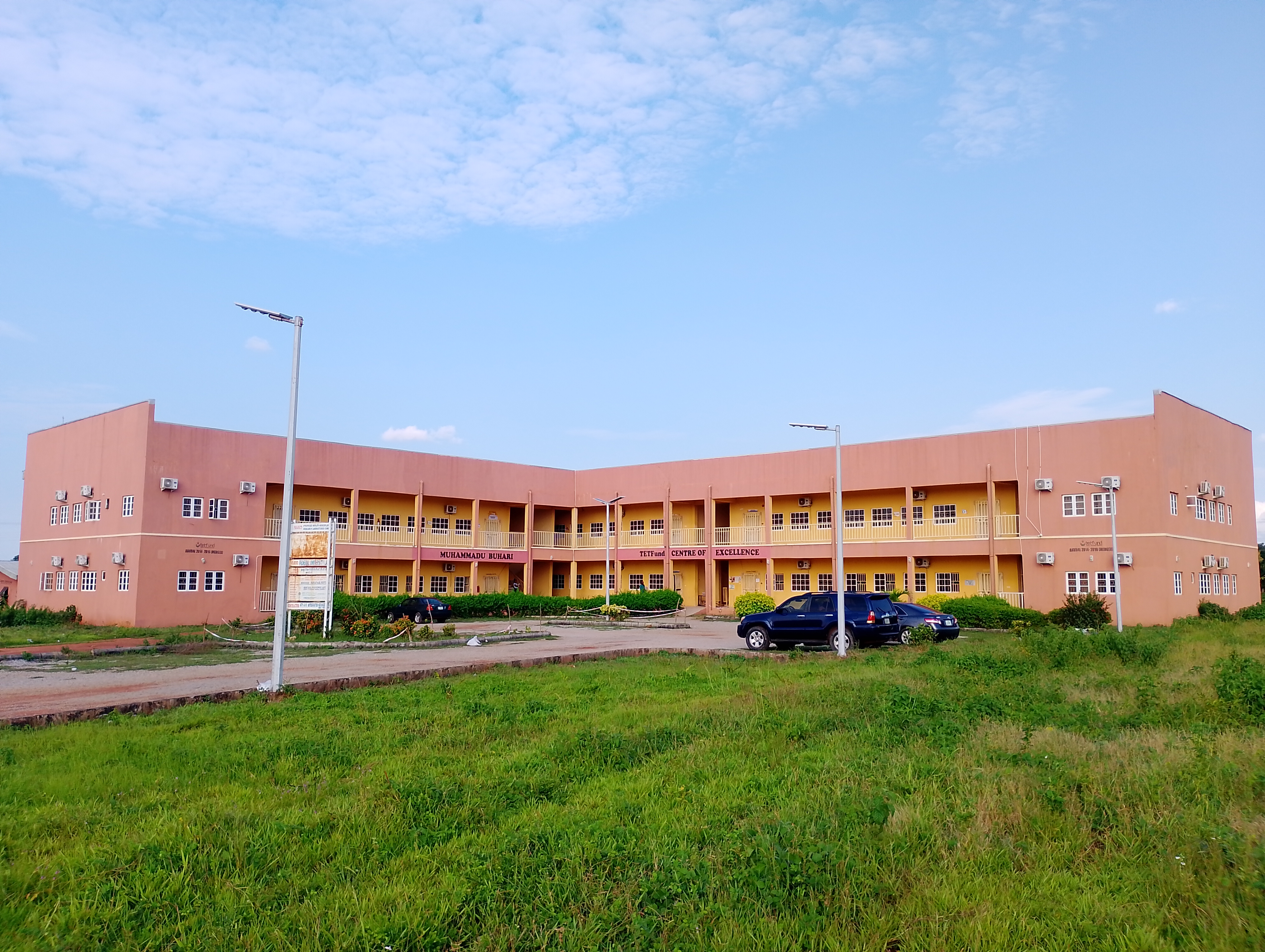
Multi-Disciplinary Research Laboratories Complex (Muhammadu Buhari)

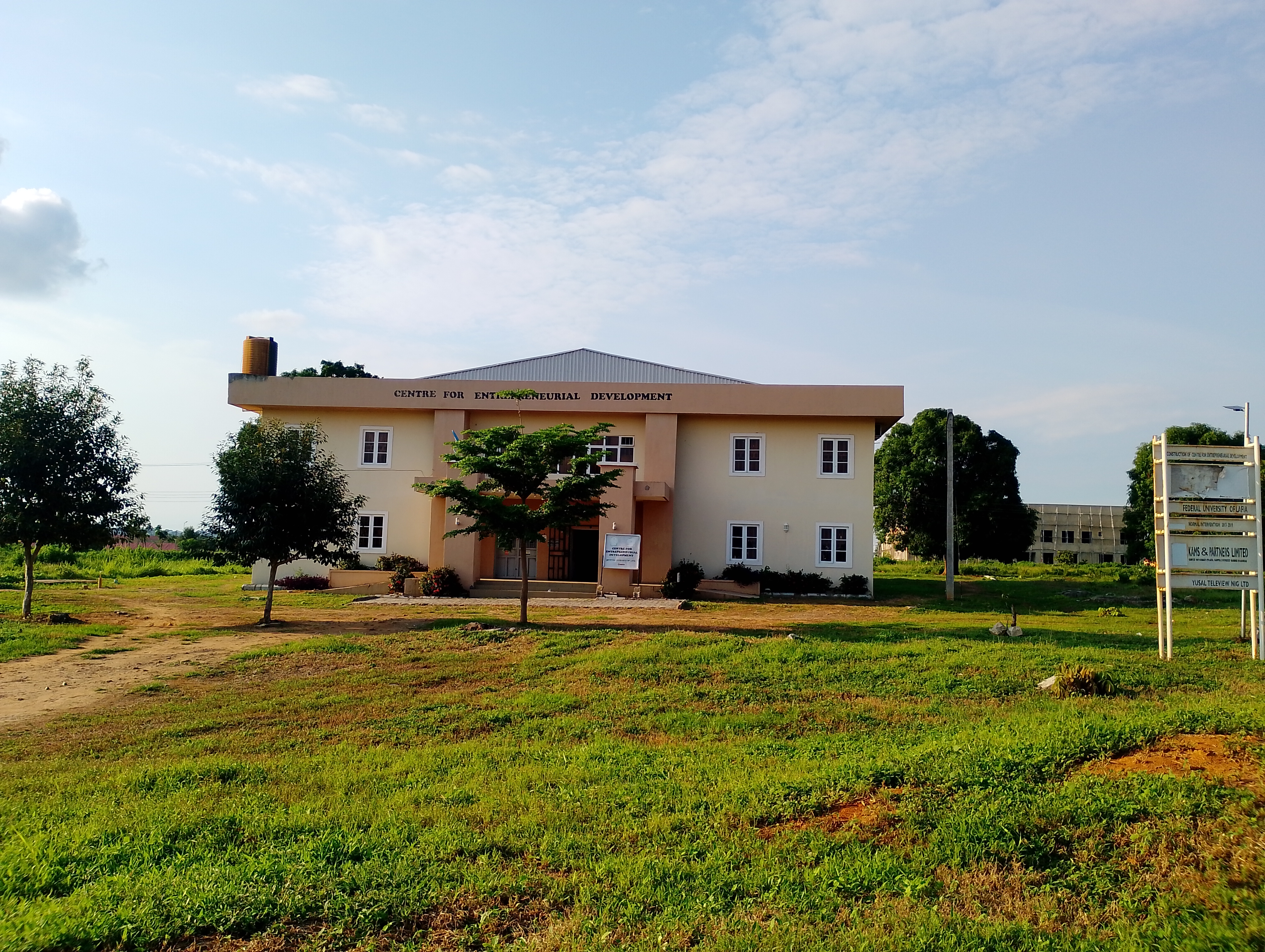
Centre for Entrepreneurial Development, Permanent Site

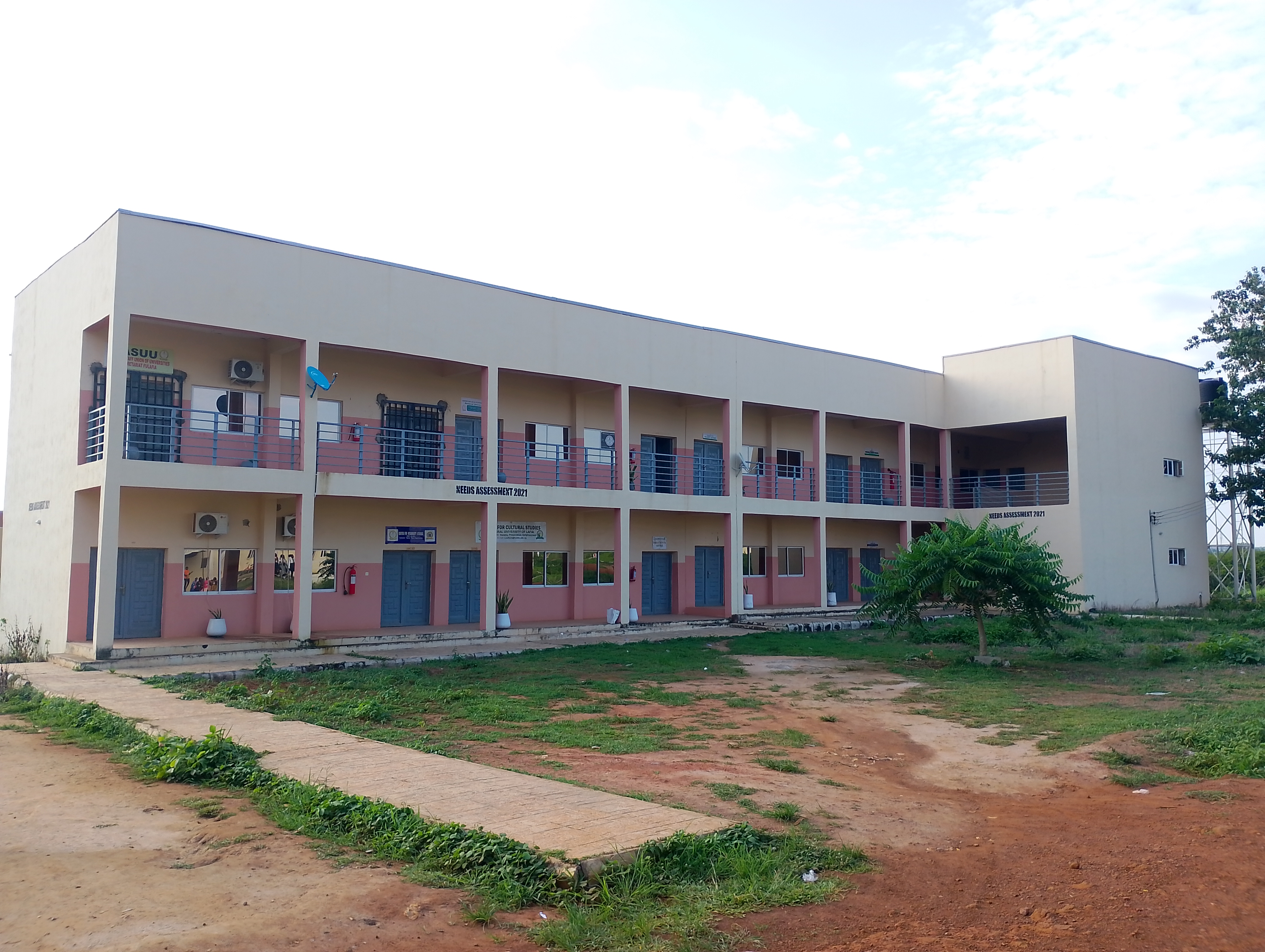
New building of Need Assessment Centre, opposite Faculty of Environmental Design

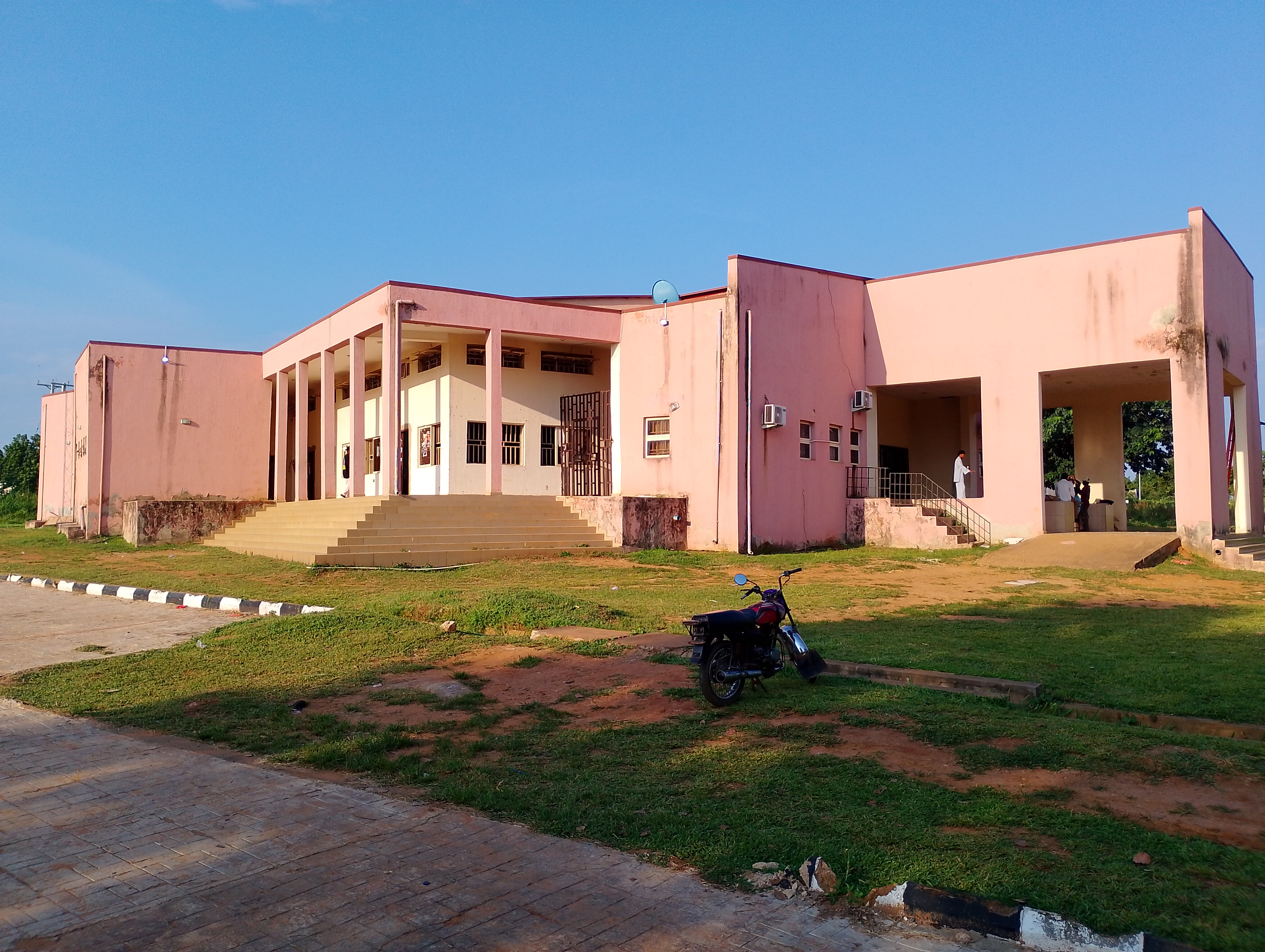
FULafia 500 Seaters Auditorium Permanent Site

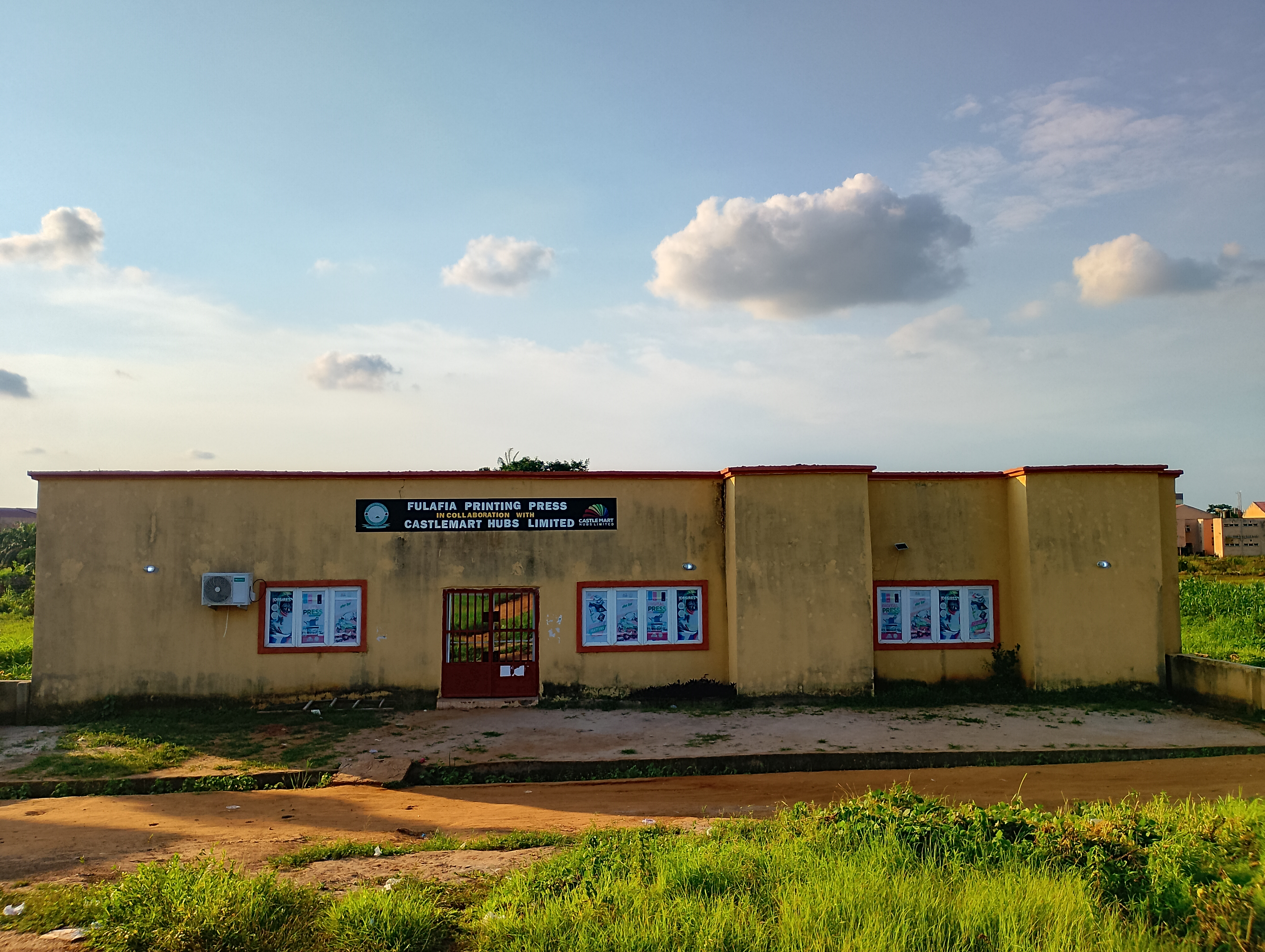
FULAFIA PRINTING PRESS

Central Mosque FuLafia

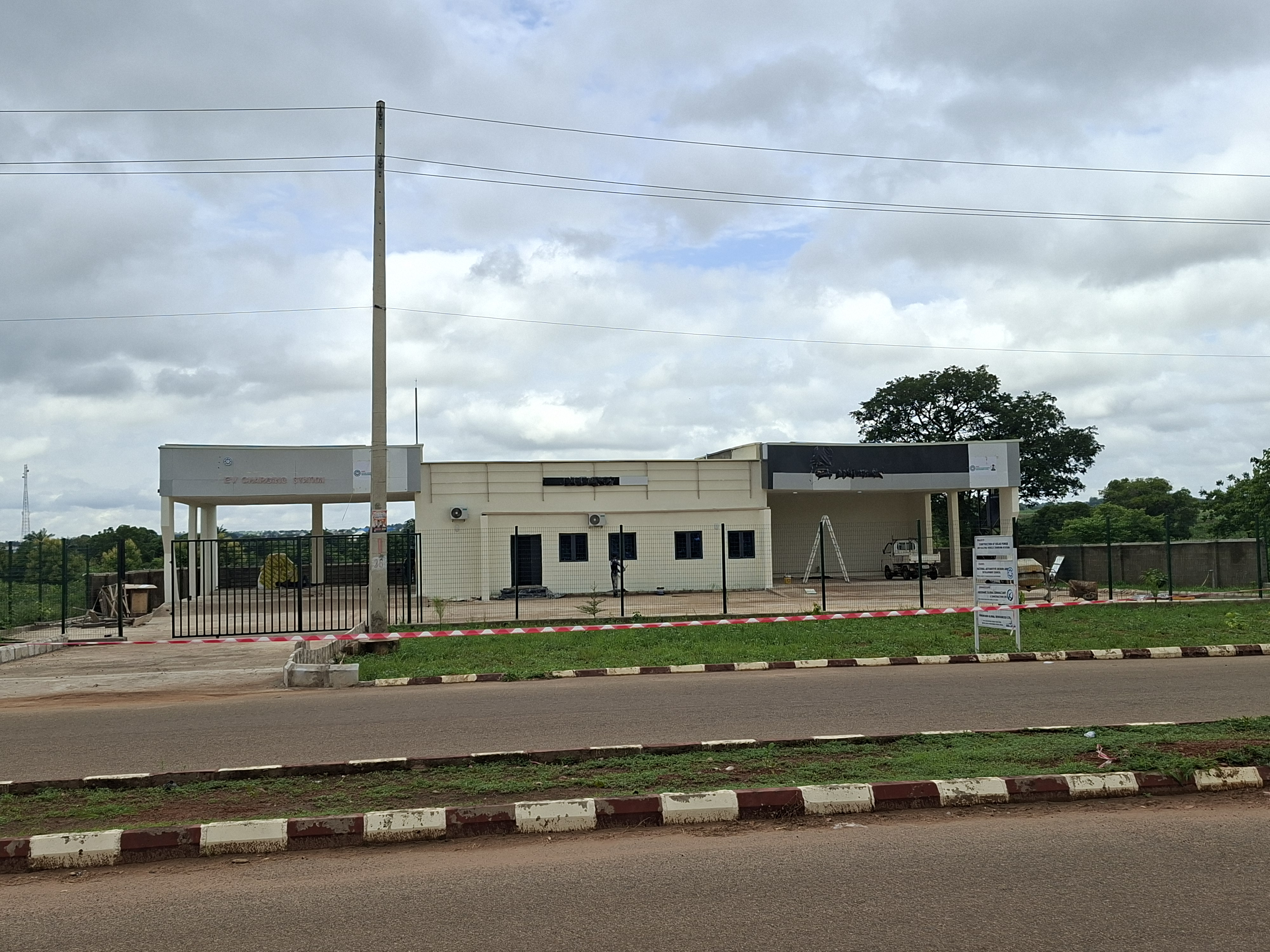
EV Charging Station FULAFIA
