= Kalu Mosto Onuoha =

Nigerian academic

- Born: 17 July 1947 (age 78); Akanu Ohafia, Abia State, Nigeria
- Citizenship: Nigerian
- Occupations: geologist; Educationist; researcher
- Parent(s): Moses Onuoha Emea and Mrs. Janet Ikodiya Onuoha (née Uzo Uche)
- Awards: Winner of the “Chief M. O. Feyide Medal” of the Nigerian Mining & Geosciences Society (NMGS) in “recognition of excellent and consistent contribution to the Field of Petroleum Geology in Africa”, and the “Dr. Nnamdi Azikiwe Prize” for “consistently advancing and promoting the study of the Earth Sciences”.

Kalu Mosto Onuoha (born 17 July 1947) is a Nigerian Professor Emeritus of Geology. In January 2017, he became the president of the Nigerian Academy of Science after previously serving as its treasurer (2010–2013), vice president (2013–2015), and president-elect in 2016.

== Education and career ==
Kalu Mosto Onuoha was born on 17 July 1947 in Akanu Ohafia, Abia State. Onuoha received early education (primary and secondary school) in Nigeria, finishing from the prestigious Hope Waddel Institute, Calabar. He attended Lorànd Eötvös University in Budapest, Hungary, where he majored in geophysics, obtaining the PhD degree (summa cum laude) in 1978. After a decade of studies and post-doctoral research work in Europe, he returned to Nigeria in 1980. He was employed by University of Nigeria, Nsuka (UNN) as a lecturer in the department of geology in 1980. Onuoha excelled in his lecturing job at UNN, rising to the position of head of the department (HOD) of geology in 1987. In October 1988, he earned a promotion to the rank of a full professor of geology.

In 1998, Onuoha was inducted as a Fellow of the Nigerian Academy of Science. He is also a Fellow of the Nigerian Mining & Geosciences Society (NMGS), Fellow of the Nigerian Association of Petroleum Explorationists (NAPE). He is a member of the American Association of Petroleum Geologists (AAPG), and also of the Society of Exploration Geophysicists (SEG).

At UNN, Onuoha supervised and mentored many undergraduate and postgraduate students. Several of his students excelled in their careers with many of them rising to top positions in the oil and gas industry while some of those in academic rose to the rank of professors in different universities within and outside Nigeria

In 1991, he was appointed Chair of Petroleum Geology, at the University of Calabar, becoming the first Professor at the Mobil Producing Nigeria (subsidiary of ExxonMobil) from 1991 to 1992. Onuoha took a leave of absence from the UNN in 1996 to serve as Technology Development Adviser (Subsurface Development Services) at the Shell Petroleum Development Company Limited, Port Harcourt. He vacated this position in 2002, and returned to UNN. In January 2003, Onuoha was appointed to the Shell/NNPC Chair of Geology serving in this capacity until December 2012. He was a Deputy Vice-Chancellor (Academic) of University of Nigeria, Nsukka between 2005 and 2009. In January 2013, he was appointed to the PTDF Chair of Petroleum Geology at the UNN.

Prof. Onuoha will be succeeded at the end of his four-year tenure as President of the Nigerian Academy of Science by Prof. Ekanem Ikpi Braide who has served for three years as the academy's vice-president. Prof. Braide has earlier served as Vice-Chancellor of two different universities and is currently the Pro-Chancellor of Arthur Jarvis University.
