= Shehu Abdul Rahman =

Nigerian academic

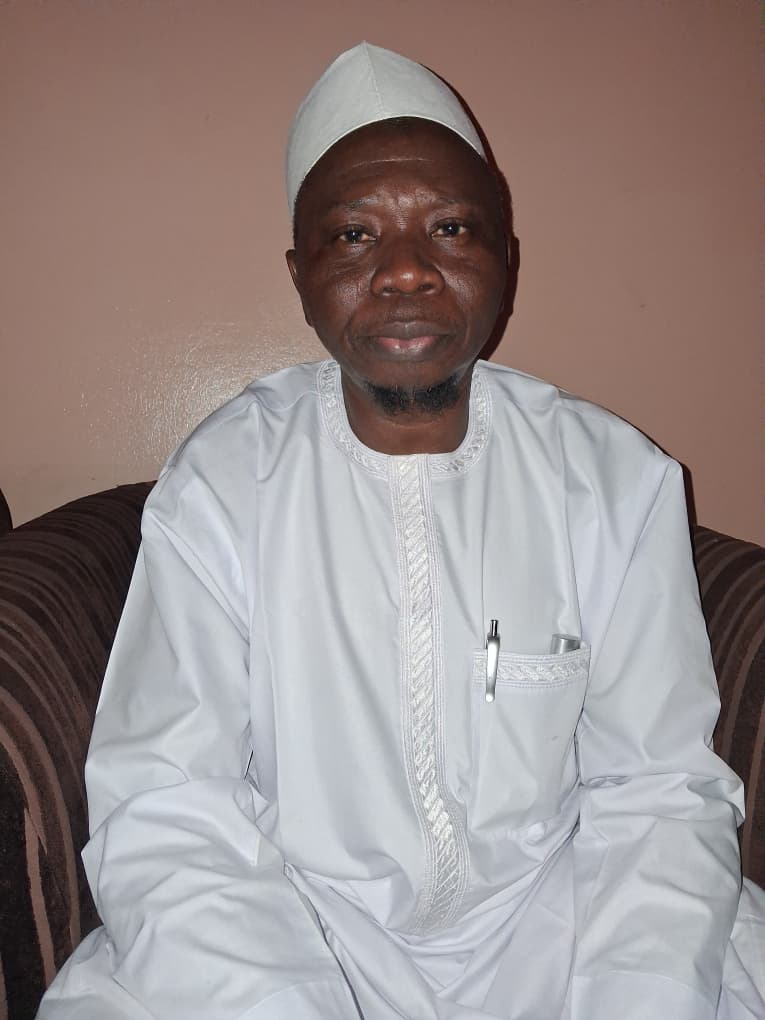

3rd Vice Chancellor of the Federal University of Lafia
- In office 2021–2026
- Preceded by: Muhammad Sanusi Liman
- Succeeded by: Mohammed Isa Kida

Personal details
- Born: April 7, 1968 (age 58) Umaisha, Nasarawa State
- Citizenship: Nigeria
- Education: Ahmadu Bello University, Zaria
- Alma mater: Ahmadu Bello University
- Occupation: Academic; Researcher
- Profession: Agricultural economist

Shehu Abdul Rahman is a Nigerian professor of Agricultural Economics. He was the pioneer Vice-Chancellor of Federal University Gashua and former Deputy Vice-Chancellor (DVC) (Admin.), Nasarawa State University, Keffi. He served as the 3rd Vice-Chancellor of Federal University of Lafia from 2021 to 2026.

== Early life and education ==
Shehu Abdul was born in Umaisha, a town in Toto LGA of Nasarawa State in the Kingdom of Opanda on the 7th April, 1968. In 1975, he obtained his First School Leaving Certificate from Anglican Transferred Primary School, Umaisha. He obtained his GCE O' Level from Ahmadiyya College, Umaisha. He earned his Bachelor of Agriculture degree in 1993, M.Sc. Agric. Economics in 1998 and a Ph.D. in Agric. Economics in 2001 from Ahmadu Bello University, Zaria, Nigeria.

== Academic career ==
He started his academic career as an assistant Lecturer at Ahmadu Bello University, Zaria in 1994. He was promoted to Lecturer II in 1998. He later moved to Nasarawa State University, Keffi where he became Senior Lecturer in 2003. Associate Professor in 2005 and a professor in 2008 and he eventually moved to Federal University of Lafia as a professor in 2019.

== Administrative career ==
He was the Head of Department of Agricultural Economics and Extension of Nasarawa State University, Keffi from 2006 to 2009. He became the Deputy Dean of Faculty of Agriculture of Nasarawa State University, Keffi, Shabu-Lafia Campus from 2006 to 2007. He was appointed as the Dean of Faculty of Agriculture Nasarawa State University, Keffi from 2007 to 2011. He became the Deputy Vice-Chancellor (Administration) of Nasarawa State University, Keffi from 2012 to 2013. From 2013 - 2016, he was the Vice-Chancellor of Federal University of Gashua. He became the Director of Centre for Agricultural and Rural Development Studies (CARDS) of Federal University of Lafia in 2019. In 2020, he was the Dean of Faculty of Agriculture of Federal University of Lafia. In 2020, he was appointed as the Vice-Chancellor of Federal University of Lafia, and he assumed office in February 2021.

He also served as Chairman of the Association of Deans of Agriculture in Nigerian Universities from May 2010 to May 2012.

He completed his five-year tenure in February 2026 and was succeeded by Professor Mohammed Isa Kida.

== Area of Academic Interest ==
=== Research ===
Shehu Abdul Rahman is interested in carrying out research in gender issues in agriculture, application of econometric models, agricultural technology economists, production economics of crops and livestock and farm management Economics.

=== Teaching ===
Shehu Abdul Rahman is interested in teaching econometrics, mathematical economics, statistics, microeconomic theory, research methods (Qualitative and Quantitative), agricultural production economics, farm management economics and quantitative techniques

== Selected publications ==
- Rahman, S.A., Haruna, I.M. and Alamu J.F. (2002). Economic Performance of Maize Using Organic and Inorganic Fertilizers in Soba Area of Kaduna State, Nigeria. ASSET: An International Journal Series A, 2(2): 21–27.
- Ani, A.O. and Rahman, S.A. (2007). Media-based agricultural information and i its influence on farm investment decisions in Michika area of Adamawa State, Nigeria. Asian Pacific Journal of Rural Development (APJORD). 17(2):61-66.
- Rahman, S.A. (2008). Women's involvement in agriculture in northern and southern Kaduna State, Nigeria. Journal of Gender Studies, 17, 17 - 26.
- Rahman, S.A., & Lawal, A.B. (2003). Economic analysis of maize-based cropping systems in Giwa Local Government Area of Kaduna State, Nigeria.
- Rahman, S.A. (2009). Gender Analysis of labour contribution and productivity for popular cropping systems in Kaduna State of Northern Nigeria. Tropical Agricultural Research and Extension.
