= Fatima Mohammed Habib =

Nigerian social entrepreneur

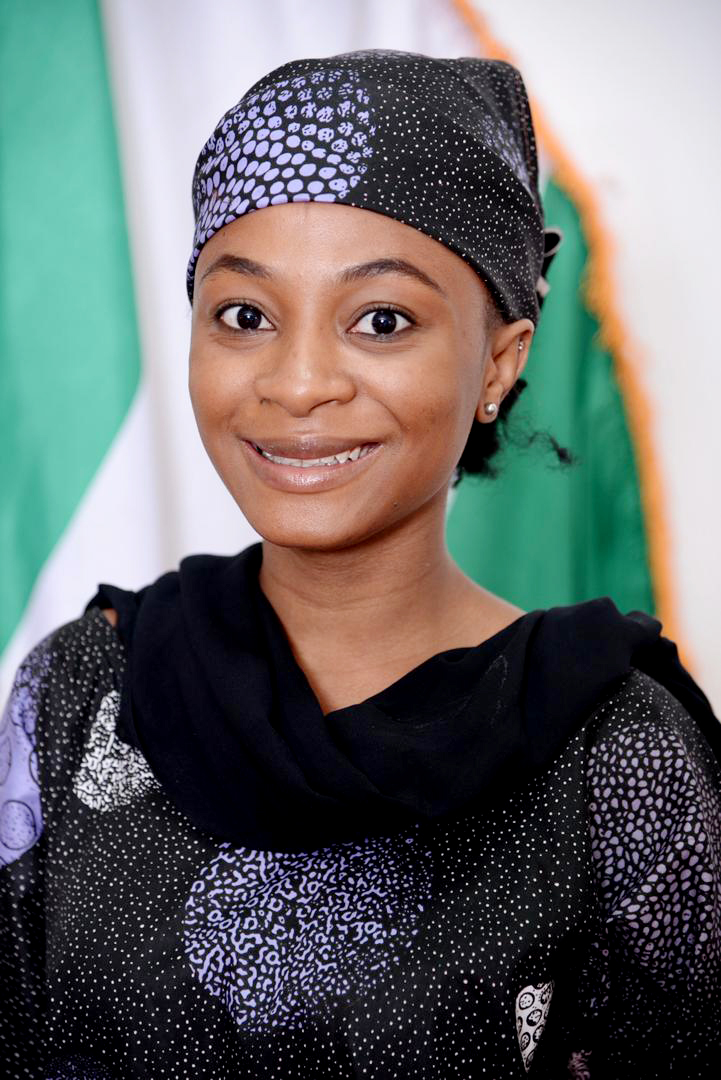
- Born: 23 September 1999 (age 26)
- Education: University of Maiduguri
- Occupations: Social Entrepreneur, Humanitarian
- Years active: 2014–present
- Known for: Advocacy for Human Value Foundation

Fatima Mohammed Habib (born 23 September 1999) is a Nigerian social entrepreneur and founder of Advocacy for Human Value Foundation (AHVF), a Non-Governmental Organization registered with the Corporate Affairs commission which she founded at the age of 14. Habib is amongst those on the fight against illiteracy in Northern Nigeria and she is also part of the "Bring Back Our Girls Campaign" in the Northeast.

== Early life ==
Habib started her Primary education at Abande Memorial School, Maiduguri in 2005 then completed her secondary school education at Maitama Model Secondary School, Abuja in 2014 and a student of Political Science at the University of Maiduguri.

== Career ==
At the age of 14, Fatima founded Advocacy for Human Value Foundation; a Non-profitable organization that aims on improving the lives of the most vulnerable by providing them with basic needs such as Water, Sanitation and Hygiene (WASH), health care services, protection and education across Nigeria. Her initial and original inspiration came from the influence of her late grandparent, Late Hon. Kadi Alkali Habib and Alhaji Tahar Ahmad as well as her parent, Muhammad Habib and Rukaiyya Muhammad Tahir.

In October, 2020, Huawei Technology Company Nigeria Limited partnered with Fatima's NGO and The Federal Ministry of Communication and Digital Economy in donating Standard equipment and renovated the school building of Al-Walidyn Charitable School in Pantami Community, Gombe State, Nigerian.
