= Ekanem Ikpi Braide =

Parasitologist and vice-chancellor of Nigerian university

- Born: 6 March 1946 (age 80); Cross River State
- Education: University of Ife, Cornell University
- Occupation: Vice-Chancellor
- Known for: Parasitology
- Awards: Jimmy/Roslynn Carter Award for outstanding dedication and achievement in the eradication of guinea worm in Nigeria Cross River State 2000 Millennium Award (2000) Nigerian National honor of the Officer of the Order of the Federal Republic (OFR) (2010)

Ekanem Ikpi Braide (OFR) (born 6 March 1946) is a Nigerian Parasitologist. She was a vice-chancellor of Cross River University of Technology (CRUTECH), Calabar, and pioneer Vice-Chancellor of Federal University of Technology, Lafia. She is credited with a major contribution to the eradication of guinea worm in Nigeria. In 2020, she was made the first female president-elect of the Nigerian Academy of Science. Braide is chairman of the board of trustees, The Leprosy Mission (TLM) Nigeria. She is the pro-chancellor of Arthur Jarvis University, Akpabuyo, Nigeria. She is the first female president of the Nigerian Academy of Science.

== Education and career ==
Braide was born in Cross River State in 1946, and attended St Anne's School Ibadan for her secondary school education. She studied zoology at the University of Ife before obtaining her master's degree in parasitology (1973), and doctorate degree in epidemiology, Cornell University, New York (1978). She holds a Certificate in Epidemiological Methods from Southampton University (British Council Course). She is a fellow and co-founder, Nigerian Society of Parasitology; Fellow, Salzburg Seminar Session 319; fellow (president designate) Nigerian Academy of Science

Earlier in her career, Braide taught in Community Secondary School, Ugep, from 1966 to 1968, before transferring to College of Education, Port Harcourt (1973), and later moved to University of Nigeria, Nsukka, where she lectured between 1973 and 1976. In 1978, she was appointed officer and researcher (pioneer) in charge of the Onchocerciasis Control Unit of the Nigerian Institute for Trypanosomiasis Research, Kaduna until 1979. Braide has worked at the University of Calabar since 1979. She was promoted to be a professor in 1991.

Braide's research interests focuses on disease control particularly operational research, impact assessment of interventions, rapid assessment methods in mapping diseases and community initiatives in disease control. Between 1988 and 1998, Braide was Zonal Facilitator (South East), Nigerian Guinea worm Eradication Programme, and later joined the World Health Organisation / Federal Government of Nigeria Guinea Worm Eradication Certification Committee until 2013 when Nigeria was certified guinea worm free. Braide coordinated Anglophone teams for African Programme on Onchocerciasis Control (APOC), multi-country impact assessment of onchocerciasis control activities in Sudan, Ethiopia, Uganda, Tanzania and Nigeria. She was a member of the TDR/APOC team that developed RAPLOA, a rapid assessment tool for determining prevalence of Loa loa for quick identification of communities in areas co-endemic for onchocerciasis and loaisis that are at high risk of severe adverse reactions to Ivermectin treatment. In 2001, Braide was a member of WHO/APOC Technical Consultative Committee (TCC), and in 2003, she assumed the chairmanship position of the committee until 2006.

Between 2003 and 2006, Braide served as a member on committee of Mectizan Expert. From 2007 to 2018, she served as member (Alternate Chairman) of National Steering Committee, Nigerian Neglected Tropical Diseases Programme. In 2018, Braide was appointed Chairman, Technical Advisory Committee, Cross River State Neglected Tropical Diseases Programme. She was a member of the Board of Trustees of Sightsavers for eight years and was the chair of the Technical Advisory Group (TAG) (the 4 year Sightsavers) DFID funded NTD UNITED project that ended in 2019.

Braide is chairman of the board of trustees for The Leprosy Mission Nigeria.

She was the pioneer Vice Chancellor of the Federal University of Technology, Lafia (2011 - 2016) and Vice-Chancellor Cross River University of Technology (CRUTECH), Calabar (2004 - 2009). She is also one of the board members of Nigeria's foremost non-governmental organization, Society for Family Health, Nigeria.

Braide is a recipient of Jimmy/Roslynn Carter Award for outstanding dedication and achievement in the eradication of guinea worm in Nigeria. In 2000, she received Cross River State 2000 Millennium Award. In July 2010, Braide received a Nigerian national honor award of Officer of the Order of the Federal Republic (OFR), for her contribution to disease control in Nigeria conferred to her by the Nigerian president.

In 2020, she was named president-elect of the Nigerian Academy of Science. She became the first woman to be president of the academy in January 2021, succeeding Professor Kalu Mosto Onuoha. Braide has already been the academy's vice-president.

== Awards ==
- Cross River State 2000 Millennium Award
- Jimmy/Roslynn Carter Award
- Officer of the Order of the Federal Republic
