= Ibrahim Abubakar Njodi =

Nigerian professor of health education

- Born: 13 January 1959 (age 67); Kaltungo, Gombe State
- Education: University of Maiduguri

Ibrahim Abubakar Njodi (born January 1959) is a Nigerian Professor of Health education and immediate past Vice Chancellor of the University of Maiduguri. He assumed office as Vice Chancellor of the University on June 3, 2014 and prior to his appointment, he was the Deputy Vice Chancellor of the university. Prof Ibrahim Njodi was appointed Secretary to the Gombe State government by Governor Inuwa Yahya immediately after his tenure elapsed as the Vice Chancellor of University of Maiduguri.

== Education ==
Ibrahim Abubakar Njodi went to L.E.A Primary School in Kaltungo from 1967 to 1973, and then ECWA Primary School in Kaltungo from 1973 to 1975. From 1975 to 1980, he attended the government teacher's college in Jama'are, Bauchi state. He earned his bachelors degree in Physical and Health Education in 1985, from University of Maiduguri. Later, from 1988 to 1991, he pursued his master's degree in health education at the same university. From 2000 to 2003, he pursued his Ph.D. in public health education at the famous University of Nigeria, Nsukka.

== Career ==
He joined the civil service as a Graduate Assistant with University of Maiduguri in 1987. Njodi served as acting Dean of the Faculty of Education from 2008 to 2010, and was then elected substantive Dean of the same faculty in 2010. He was named Deputy Vice Chancellor (Academic Services) in 2010 and Vice Chancellor from June 2014 to June 2019. Presently, Professor Ibrahim Abubakar Njodi is the Secretary to the State Government (SSG) of Gombe State.
