= Xəlilli, Davachi =

Xəlilli
- Municipality
- Location within Azerbaijan
- Coordinates: 41°17′50″N 48°58′47″E
- Country: Azerbaijan
- Rayon: Davachi

Population
  - Total: 433
- Time zone: UTC+4 (AZT)
  - Summer (DST): UTC+5 (AZT)

Xəlilli (also, Khalikhli and Khalilli) is a village and municipality in the Davachi Rayon of Azerbaijan. It has a population of 433. The municipality consists of the villages of Xələlli, Liman, and Sarvan.
