= Sarvan, Shabran =

Sarvan
- Location within Azerbaijan
- Coordinates: 41°16′58″N 49°01′16″E
- Country: Azerbaijan
- Rayon: Davachi
- Municipality: Xəlilli
- Time zone: UTC+4 (AZT)
  - Summer (DST): UTC+5 (AZT)

Sarvan (also, Sarven”) is a village in the Davachi Rayon of Azerbaijan. The village forms part of the municipality of Xəlilli.
