= Russian ship Liman =

Russian naval intelligence vessel that sunk after a collision

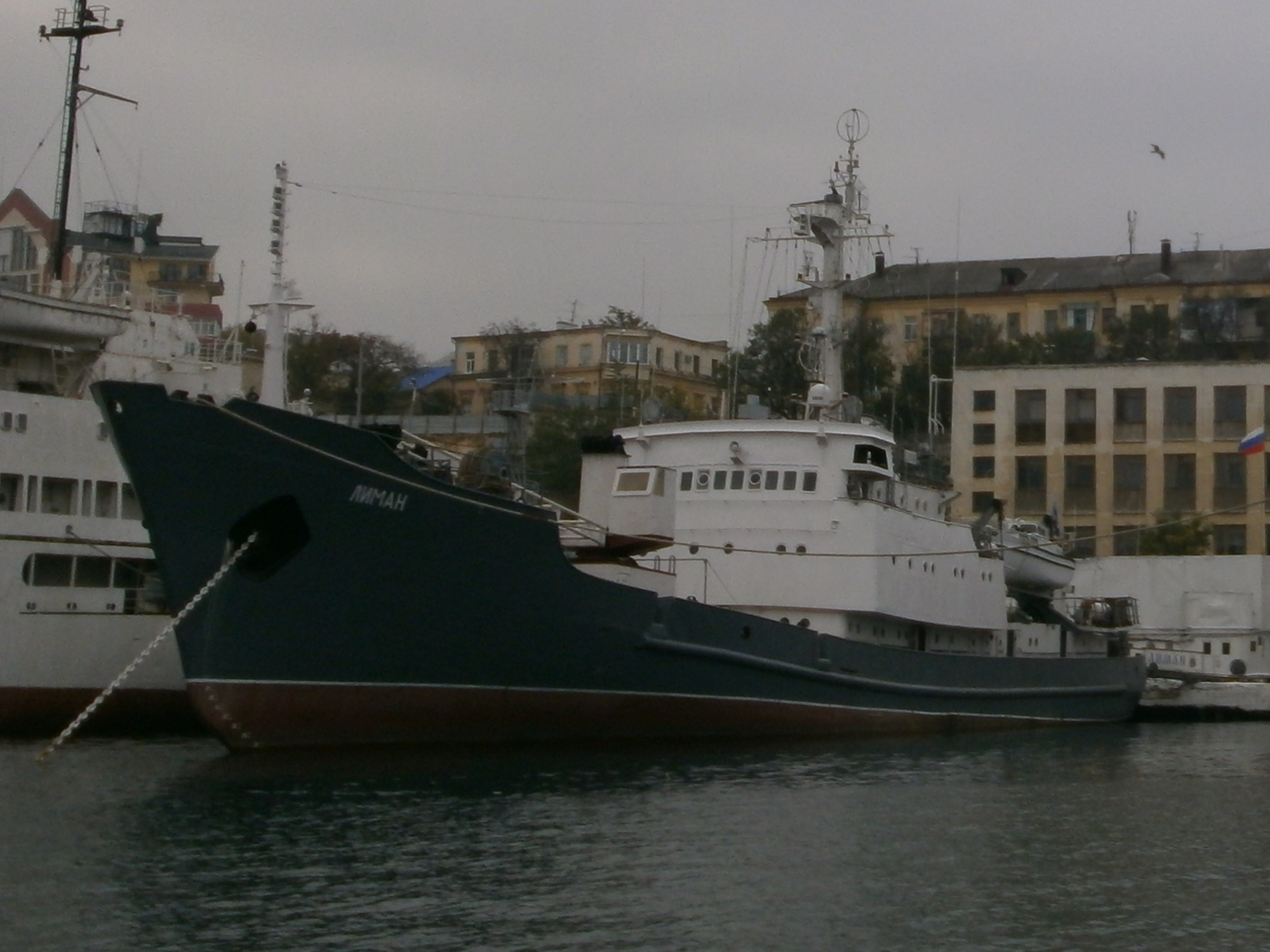
- Liman docked at Sevastopol in 2013

History
- Name: Liman
- Namesake: Liman, a type of estuary prevalent in the Black Sea and Sea of Azov
- Operator: Soviet Navy (1970–1991); Russian Navy (1991–2017)
- Builder: Stocznia Polnocna
- Launched: 1970
- Fate: Sank 27 April 2017

General characteristics
- Class & type: Modified Moma-class survey ship
- Type: Spy ship
- Displacement: 1,542 tons full load
- Length: 73.32 m (240 ft 7 in)
- Beam: 10.80 m (35 ft 5 in)
- Draught: 3.85 m (12 ft 8 in)
- Installed power: 2 × Zgoda-Sulzer diesel engines, 1,800 hp (1,300 kW) each
- Speed: 17.3 knots (32.0 km/h)
- Crew: 78
- Armament: 16 × Strela-2 surface to air missiles

Liman (Russian: Лиман) was a Russian naval intelligence vessel that sunk after a collision in 2017 which resulted in no casualties.

== Description ==
The ship was 73.32 metres (240 ft 7 in) long, with a beam of 10.80 metres (35 ft 5 in) and a draught of 3.85 metres (12 ft 8 in). It displaced 1,542 tons at full load. The vessel was propelled by two Zgoda-Sulzer 6TD-48 diesel engines, rated at 1,800 horsepower (1,300 kW) each. The ship had a speed of 17.3 knots (32.0 km/h). Armament was sixteen Strela-2 surface-to-air missiles.

== History ==
The ship was built in 1970 by Stocznia Polnocna, Gdańsk as a hydrographic survey vessel and converted to military use in 1989. It was outfitted for signals intelligence (SIGINT) purposes. It initially served with the Northern Fleet and was transferred to the Black Sea Fleet in 1974. In April 1999, Liman was deployed in the Adriatic Sea at the request of Yugoslav president Slobodan Milošević to monitor NATO operations against Yugoslavia. It also saw service during the Russian intervention in the Syrian Civil War.

== Sinking ==
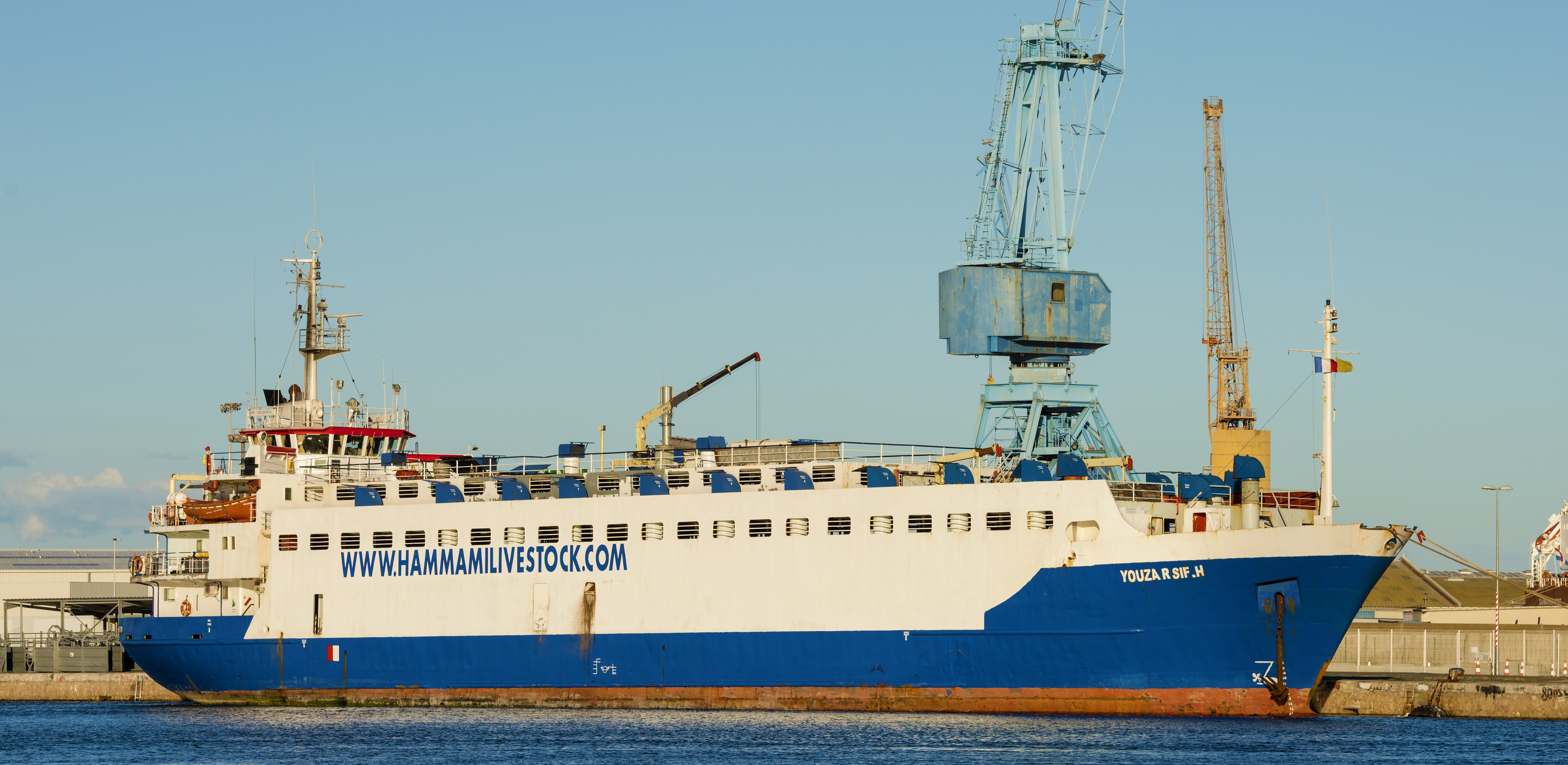
Youzarsif H in 2015

On 27 April 2017, the vessel sank in the Black Sea following a collision with Youzarsif H, a Togo-flagged livestock freighter which was heading to Jordan from Romania. The location of the collision was 29 kilometres (16 nmi) off Kilyos. The route of the Russian ship was not known. However, in February, military sources indicated that Liman was observing NATO's naval maneuvers in the Black Sea during exercise Sea Shield. At the time it sank, the ship carried a crew of 78, all of whom were rescued. Later all crew were transferred to the Russian cargo ship Ulus Star. Youzarsif H proceeded to return to the Port of Midia, Romania due to concerns about the welfare of the livestock she was carrying. Once at the port, the transported sheep were transferred to another vessel. After damage checks, it was established that the cargo ship only suffered minor damages to the bow.

On 3 May, Russia sent the rescue ships SB-739 and Seliger to the area where Liman sank to try to salvage sensitive equipment from the ship or even raise the vessel, which sank in international waters.
