= Liman, Shabran =

Village in Azerbaijan

Liman is a village in the municipality of Xəlilli in the Davachi Rayon of Azerbaijan.
