= Sarvan, Madhya Pradesh =

Village in Madhya Pradesh, India

Coordinates: 23°29′05″N 74°49′45″E

Sarvan is a village in Sailana Tehsil in Ratlam district of Madhya Pradesh, India. It belongs to Ujjain division. It is located 32 km north of District headquarters Ratlam and 298 km from State capital Bhopal. Sarvan Pin code is 457550 and postal head office is Sailana.

Sarvan is surrounded by Piploda Tehsil towards the north, Ratlam Tehsil towards the south, Jaora Tehsil towards the east, and Chhoti Sarwan Tehsil towards the west.

Ratlam, Banswara, Pratapgarh, and Mandsaur are the nearby cities to Sarvan.

== Demographics ==
Malwi is the local language here.

== Transportation ==
=== By Rail ===
There is no railway station with a distance of less than 10 km from Sarvan. However, Ratlam Junction railway station is a major railway station 20 km away from Sarvan.

=== By Bus ===
Sarvan is situated between Ratlam and Banswada root. From Ratlam, Sarvan is 32 km away. Bus is an easy way to reach Sarvan from Ratlam.

== Education ==
=== Colleges near Sarvan ===
- Mahi School of Nursing

Address : Sarwan Palace, Ratlam (M.P.) -- 4570021

- Shivang College Of Physiotherapy

Address : (aicte Approved) Pahadia Rd Jaora; Dist. Ratlam----457 226

- Pt. Sivshaktilal Sharma Ay Mahavidyalaya

Address : Ratlam; Madhya Pradesh

- Dr M.b. Sharma Nursing College

Address : 474; Katju Nagar A Ratlam (m.p.) -- 4570021

- Pandit Shivshaktilal Ayurvedic Medical College

Address : 497; Katju Nagar A Ratlam (m.p.) -- 4570021

=== Schools in Sarvan ===
- Shabri Sansker Vidha Mandir Sarvan

Address : sarvan, sailana, ratlam, Madhya Pradesh . PIN- 457551

- Ganesh Gyan Mandir

Address : sarvan, sailana, ratlam, Madhya Pradesh . PIN- 457551

- New Convent Sarvan

Address : sarvan, sailana, ratlam, Madhya Pradesh . PIN- 457551

- G.g.m.s.sarvan

Address : sarvan, sailana, ratlam, Madhya Pradesh . PIN- 457551

- G.b.m.s.sarvan

Address : sarvan, sailana, ratlam, Madhya Pradesh . PIN- 457551

== Basic Information ==
Tehsil Name: Sailana

District: Ratlam

Division: Ujjain

State: Madhya Pradesh

Language: Malwi and Hindi, English

Time zone: IST (UTC+5:30)

Elevation / Altitude: 494 meters. Above Sea level

Telephone Code / Std Code: 07413

Pin Code: 457550

Post Office Name: Sailana

Alternate Village Name: Sarwan
