= University of Maiduguri =

Federal university in Maiduguri, Nigeria

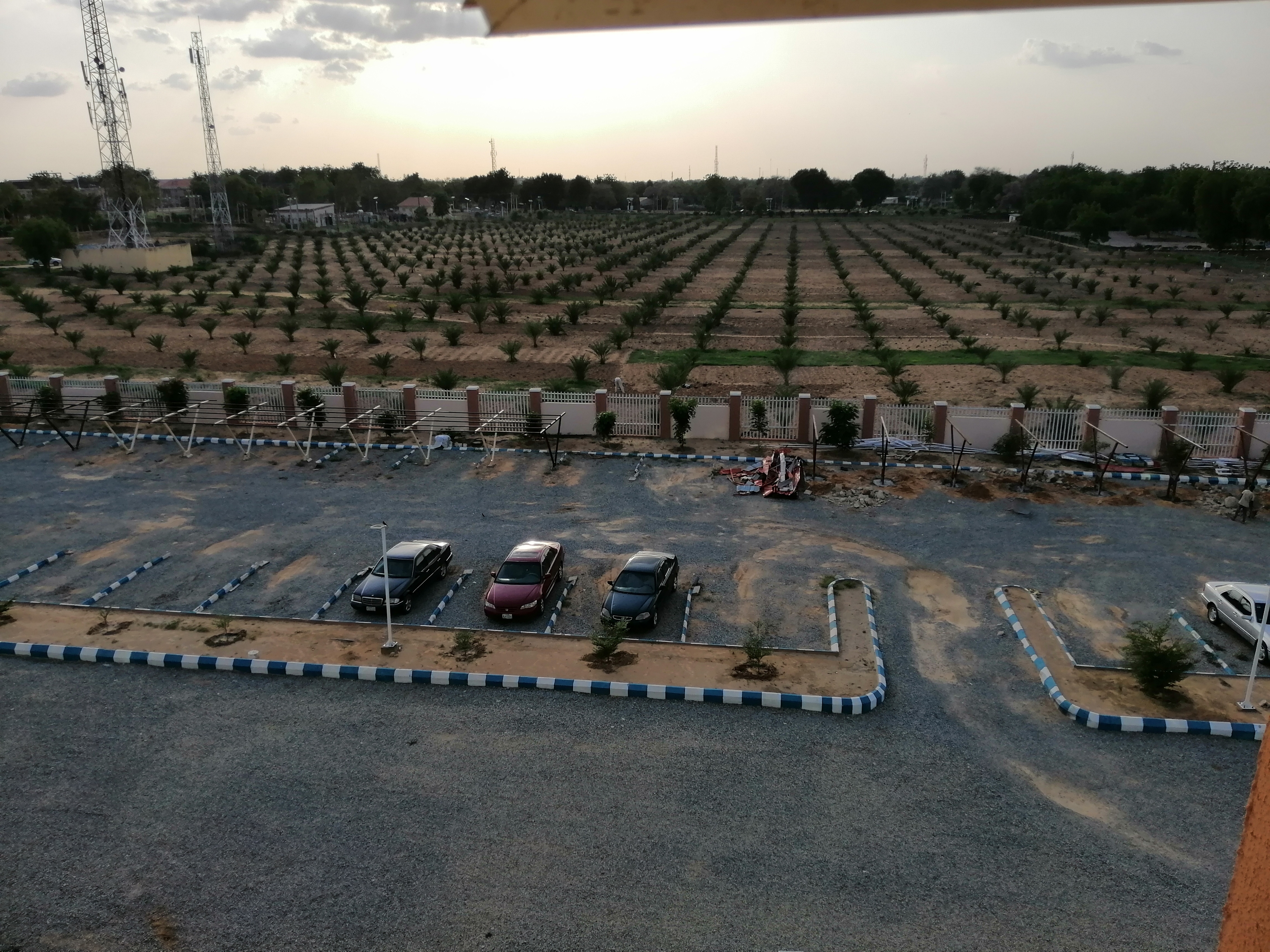
- University of Maiduguri's garden
- Motto: Knowledge is Light
- Type: Public
- Established: 1975
- Affiliations: AAU, NUC, ASUU
- Budget: ₦1,920,660,623.11
- Chairman: Mal Ballama Manu
- Chancellor: Oba Lamidi Olayiwola Adeyemi
- Vice-Chancellor: Professor Mohammed Laminu Mele
- Location: Maiduguri, North East, Borno, Nigeria; 11.8049°N 13.1970°E
- Campus: Urban
- Language: English
- Nickname: UNIMAID
- Website: www.unimaid.edu.ng

The Muhammadu Buhari University formerly The University of Maiduguri, is a federal-government-owned higher institution located in Maiduguri, the capital city of Borno State in Northeast Nigeria.

== History ==
The university was created by the federal government of Nigeria in 1975, with the intention of its becoming one of the country's principal higher-education institutions. It enrolls about 25,000 students in its combined programs, which include a college of medicine and faculties of agriculture, arts, environmental science, Allied health science, Basic medical science, dentistry, education, engineering, law, management science, pharmacy, science, social science, and veterinary medicine. With the encouragement of the federal government, the university has recently been increasing its research efforts, particularly in the fields of agriculture, medicine and conflict resolution, and expanding the university press. The university is the major higher institution of learning in the north-eastern part of the country. Following the death of former President Muhammadu Buhari on 13 July 2025, the Federal Executive Council under President Bola Ahmed Tinubu approved renaming the university to Muhammadu Buhari University of Maiduguri.

== Faculties (colleges) ==
Muhammadu Buhari University of Maiduguri has 12 faculties.

Agriculture	Arts	College of Medical Science
1. Agricultural Economics; 2. Agricultural Extension Services; 3. Animal Science; 4. Crop Production; 5. Crop Protection; 6. Fisheries; 7. Forestry and Wildlife; 8. Soil Science	1. English; 2. Fine Arts; 3. History; 4. Language and Linguistics; 5. Arabic and Islamic Studies; 6. Theatre Arts; 7. Industrial Design	1. Medicine & Surgery; 2. Dental Surgery; 3. Human Pathology; 4. Human Anatomy; 5. Human Physiology; 6. Nursing Science; 7. Physiotherapy/Medical Rehabilitation; 8. Radiography; 9. Medical Laboratory Science; 10. Ear, Nose & Throat Surgery; 11. Human Nutrition and deitetics
Education	Engineering	Law
1. Continuing Education & Extension Services; 2. Education; 3. Library and Information Science; 4. Physical and Health Education	1. Agricultural & Environmental Resources Engineering; 2. Urban and regional planning 3. Architectural technology 4. Chemical Engineering; 5. Civil & Water Resources Engineering; 6. Computer Engineering; 7. Electrical & Electronics Engineering; 8. Food Science & Technology; 9. Mechanical Engineering	1. Private Law; 2. Public Law; 3. Sharia Law
Management Science	Pharmacy	Science
1. Accountancy; 2. Business; 3. Marketing; 4. Economics; 5. Public Administration; 6. Management	1. Pharmacology & Toxicology; 2. Pharmacognosy; 3. Pharmaceutical Chemistry; 4. Pharmaceutics & Pharmaceutical Microbiology; 5. Clinical Pharmacy & Pharmacy Administration	1. Biology; 2. Biochemistry; 3. Biotechnology; 4. Environmental Biology; 5. Chemistry; 6. Glass and silicate technology 7. Industrial Chemistry; 8. Petroleum Chemistry; 9. Mathematics & Statistics; 10. Microbiology; 11. Physics
Social Sciences	Veterinary Medicine	
1. Mass Communication; 2. Geography; 3. Political Science; 4. Sociology & Anthropology	1. Veterinary Medicine; 2. Veterinary Anatomy; 3. Veterinary Pathology; 4. Veterinary Physiology, Pharmacology & Biochemistry; 5. Veterinary Microbiology & Parasitology; 6. Veterinary Public Health & Preventive Medicine; 7. Veterinary Surgery & Theriogenelogy	

== Affiliate institutions ==
The approved affiliate institutions of Muhammadu Buhari University, approved by the National Universities Commission (NUC) are as follows:

- Umar Ibn Ibrahim El-Kanemi College of Education, Science and Technology, Bama
- College of Education, Azare, Bauchi State
- College of Education, Gashua, Yobe State
- Federal College of Education (Technical), Gombe
- Annahda college of science and Islamic

Studies Diploma section

- Federal College of Education Yola

== Notable alumni ==
- Hadiza Sabuwa Balarabe Deputy Governor of Kaduna State
- Abubakar Sani Bello Governor of Niger State
- Umar Buba Bindir, Nigerian Agricultural engineer and incumbent Director-General of the National Office for Technology Acquisition and Promotion (NOTAP)
- Imrana Alhaji Buba, Activist, Social entrepreneur, recipient of Queen's Young Leader Award
- Lt-Gen Tukur Yusuf Buratai, former Chief of Army Staff, Nigeria
- Professor Mala Mohammed Daura - Former Vice Chancellor, University of Maiduguri and present Vice Chancellor Yobe State University, Damaturu.
- Chelsea Eze, actress
- Sen Lawal Yahaya Gumau, Nigerian Politician
- Fatima Mohammed Habib, Social entrepreneur and founder of Advocacy for Human Value Foundation (AHVF)
- Professor Andrew Haruna, Nigerian academic, and Vice Chancellor of Federal University Gashua
- Ibrahim Kpotun Idris, former Inspector General of Police, Nigeria
- Okezie Ikpeazu Former Governor of Abia State
- Orji Uzor Kalu, Former Governor of Abia State
- Mele Kyari, Group Managing Director of Nigerian National Petroleum Corporation
- Sen Ahmad Ibrahim Lawan, Senate President of Nigeria
- Jude Rabo, vice-chancellor of Federal University, Wukari
- Kashim Shettima, Vice President of Nigeria, former Governor of Borno State
- Aliyu Shugaba incumbent vice chancellor of University of Maiduguri
- Danladi Umar, Nigerian Jurist
- Professor Babagana Umara Zulum, Politician, Governor of Borno State

== Terrorist attacks ==
In the early morning of January 16, 2017, there was a suicide bomb attack at a mosque at the university. The explosion killed four people, including Professor Aliyu Mani and one of the attackers, and injuring seventeen. The wounded were rushed to the University of Maiduguri Teaching Hospital. Another attacker, a girl of about 12 years of age, was reportedly shot by police as she approached the university, detonating her explosives and killing her. Responsibility for the attack was claimed by Boko Haram leader Abubakar Shekau. The number of attackers involved has varied between reports, but one of the bombers was believed to be a teenage girl.

Three suicide bombers attacked the University on June 25 and June 26, 2017, killing one security guard. The university has begun digging a 27 kilometer trench around the perimeter in order to prevent Boko Haram attacks.
