= Sarvan, Salyan =

Sarvan
- Municipality
- Location within Azerbaijan
- Coordinates: 39°29′07″N 48°53′37″E
- Country: Azerbaijan
- Rayon: Salyan

Population
  - Total: 2,508
- Time zone: UTC+4 (AZT)
  - Summer (DST): UTC+5 (AZT)

Sarvan is a village and municipality in the Salyan Rayon of Azerbaijan. It has a population of 2,508.
