= Ibrahim Alhaji Liman =

Liman Alhaji Ibrahim is the current Controller General of Fire Service of Nigeria, and was born to family of Alhaji Abdulrahman Ndabida in Baro, Agaie Local Government, Area Niger State, his father was 4th Imam of Baro, Agaie Liman was also Waziri of Baro and he's erudite scholar that developed in academical

== Education background ==
He attended L.E.A Primary School Baro from 1967 to 1973, and also his high school in Baro, then proceed to Justice Fati Lami Abubakar College of Art and Legal Studies Minna from 1974 to 1979. He went for his Degree at Ahmadu Bello University, Zaria then Abubakar Tafawa Balewa University, Bauchi and gain his master's degree of Public Administration in University of Calabar in 2006, also the Bournemouth University and Royal Institute of Public Administration, (RIPA) United Kingdom.

== Career ==
Liman was pioneer Cadet in Niger State, Fire Officers, and started his career in Fire Service as a Station Officer in 1986. Fire, Crises and Disaster Management Courses, He was appointed the Controller General of Federal Fire Service of Nigeria, President Muhammadu Buhari, approved his appointment, following the retirement of Joseph Anebi, this statement signed by the Secretary of the Board,

He assumed office on March 29, 2019; before that he was assistant controller, and later became acting controller general in February 2018, until his appointment.

- Desmond Amiegbebhor
