= Abu Zamira =

- Born: Abu Zamira Mohammed
- Occupation: Leader of the Boko Haram terrorist sect
- Known for: Initiated peace talks with the Nigerian government

Abu Zamira Mohammed is a leader of the Boko Haram terrorist sect. He took power after the supposed death of Abubakar Shekau, and initiated peace talks with the Nigerian government. His current status is unknown.

== Death of Shekau ==
Imam Liman Ibrahim announced in August 2013 that Abubakr Shekau had been deposed by a group within Boko Haram due to his harsh methods. Ibrahim also announced the appointment of Abu Zamira to the position that Shekau had held, and the end of violent tactics.

== Peace negotiations ==
In August 2013, Abu Zamira appointed himself and four others as representatives for Boko Haram in peace talks with the Nigerian government. In addition to himself, the delegation comprised Abu Liman Ibrahim, Abu Adam Maisandari, Kassim Imam Biu and Mallam Modu Damaturu. These appointments were accompanied by the declaration of a 60-day ceasefire, and the announcement that any attacks in the name of Shekau were invalid.

== See also ==
- Islamism
- Jihadism
- Islamist insurgency in Nigeria
- Sharia in Nigeria
- Slavery in 21st-century Islamism
