= Muhammad Sanusi Liman =

Muhammad Sanusi Liman is a distinguished Nigerian academic, a professor of plasma physics and the second substantive Vice Chancellor of Federal University Lafia, Nasarawa state.

== Education ==
Muhammad Sanusi Liman went to Abubakar Tafawa Balewa University, in Bauchi state where he studied and received his B.Tech certificate in (1991) he proceeded for his M.Sc in the University of Jos in the year (1997) and he went to Okayama University, in Japan for his PhD in the year (2004).

== Professional bodies ==
Muhammad Sanusi Liman is a part of various professional bodies some of which are listed below

1. Nigeria Association of Theoretical Physicists (MNATP),
2. Nigerian Institute of Physics (MNIP),
3. Nigeria Association of Medical Physicists (MNAMP),
4. African Society of Plasma Technology (MASPT),
5. Japan Physical Society (MJPS).
