= Liman Ibrahim =

Alleged Boko Haram spiritual leader

Imam Liman Ibrahim is a spiritual leader in the Boko Haram terrorist sect. He was especially active after Abu Zamira assumed leadership of the group. His current status is unknown.

== Death of Shekau and Rise of Zamira ==
In August 2013, Ibrahim announced that the leader of Boko Haram, Abubakar Shekau had been deposed by factions within the group due to his "harsh" methods. Ibrahim claimed that Shekau had been given a choice to "[join] the peace dialogue with the Nigerian government, [form] his own sect or [be killed]." Ibrahim further announced the ascension of Abu Zamira Mohammed to the position that Shekau had occupied.

== See also ==
- Islamism
- Jihadism
- Islamist insurgency in Nigeria
- Sharia in Nigeria
- Slavery in 21st-century Islamism
