= Federal University, Gashua =

Nigerian university

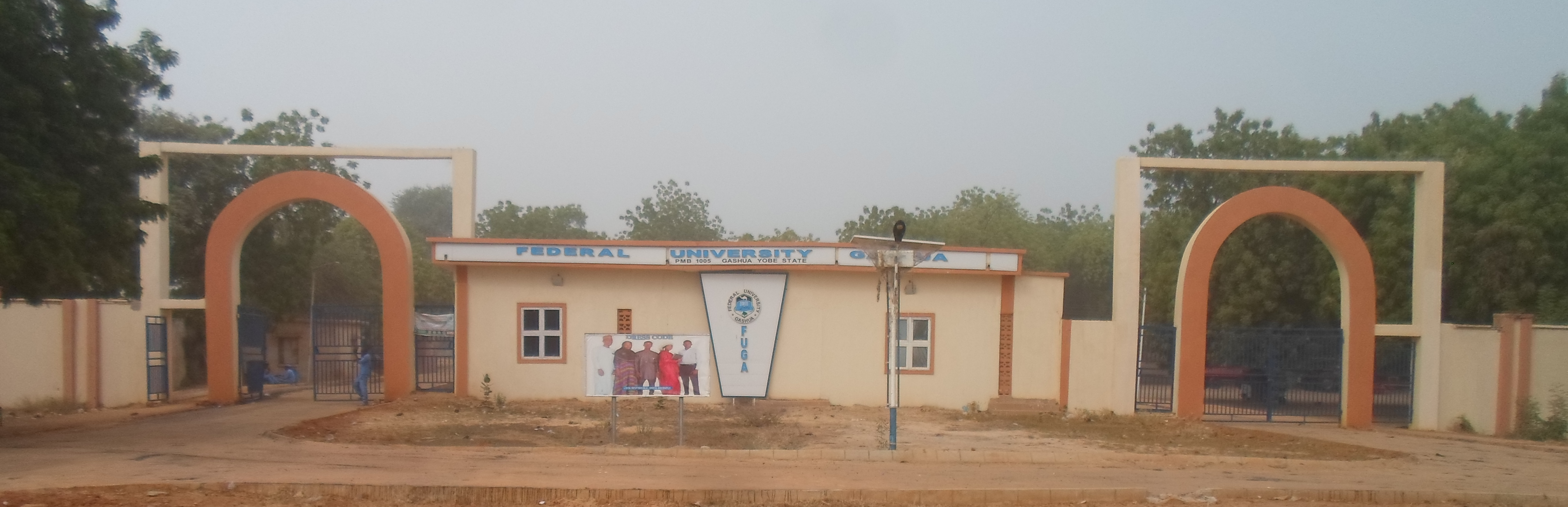
- The entrance and exit gates
- Motto: Al-ilmu Falah
- Motto in English: Knowledge is Success
- Type: Public
- Established: 2013
- Vice-Chancellor: Professor Yaqub Ahmed Geidam
- Location: Gashua, Yobe, 631001, Nigeria; 12.876°N 11.012°E
- Campus: Urban
- Website: fugashua.edu.ng

Federal University Gashua (FUGashua) is a public university located in Gashua, Yobe State, Nigeria. It was established in February 2013 as part of the Federal Government of Nigeria's initiative to expand access to higher education.Federal University Gashua Targets Academic Excellence In Five-Year Development Place

== History ==
Federal University Gashua was established during the administration of President Goodluck Jonathan. The establishment followed the Federal Government's approval of twelve new federal universities across Nigeria's six geopolitical zones to improve access to tertiary education.

Professor Shehu Abdul Rahman was appointed as the pioneer Vice-Chancellor on 18 February 2013.

The university matriculated its first set of 240 students in June 2015. By February 2018, the institution matriculated 990 students.

== Administration ==
The Vice-Chancellor is Professor Yaqub Ahmed Geidam, who assumed office in 2026.

Deputy Vice-Chancellors include:

- Dr. Mohammed Attai Yakubu (Academics)
- Dr. Ibrahim Ahmed Jajere (Administration)

The Registrar is Dr. Abubakar Mamuda.

== University Library ==
The University Library was established in 2013 to support teaching, learning, and research. It provides academic resources across the faculties and is headed by the University Librarian, Dr. Adam Gambo Saleh. The library provides both physical and online services through books collections, cataloguing and digital resources which both support conventional, remote and distance learning programs.

== Academic structure ==
Federal University Gashua offers undergraduate programmes across five faculties:

=== Faculty of Agriculture ===
- Agricultural Economics and Extension
- Agronomy
- Animal Science
- Fisheries and Aquaculture
- Forestry and Wildlife Management
- Home Economics and Management

=== Faculty of Arts and Humanities ===
- English Language
- History and International Studies
- Islamic Studies

=== Faculty of Management Sciences ===
- Accounting
- Business Administration
- Public Administration

=== Faculty of Sciences ===
- Biochemistry
- Biology
- Chemistry
- Physics
- Mathematics
- Computer Science

=== Faculty of Social Sciences ===
- Economics and Development Studies
- Geography
- Political Science
- Psychology
- Sociology

== See also ==
- List of universities in Nigeria
- Education in Nigeria
