= Noah (name) =

Male given name

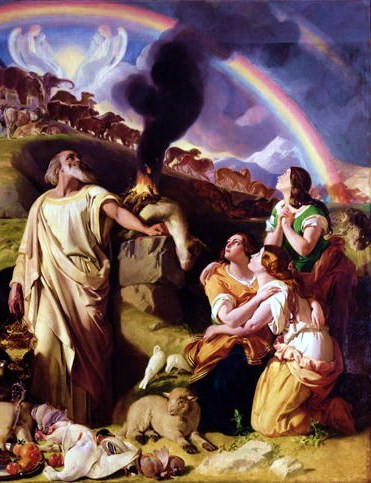
- Noah
- Pronunciation: /ˈnəʊə/
- Gender: Male

Origin
- Origin: Hebrew
- Meaning: "Rest"

Noah is historically an English male given name derived from the Biblical figure Noah (נחַ) in Hebrew. It is most likely of Hebrew in origin from the root word "nuach”/“nuakh”, meaning rest. Another explanation says that it is derived from the Hebrew root word Nahum meaning "to comfort" with the final consonant dropped.

== Popularity ==
Noah has been a popular name throughout the Anglosphere and elsewhere in the world. It has been among the most popular names for newborn boys during the 2010s and 2020s in Argentina, Australia, Austria, Belgium, Canada, Denmark, England, France, Germany, Ireland, Lithuania, the Netherlands, New Zealand, Northern Ireland, Norway, the Philippines, Puerto Rico, Scotland, Sweden, Switzerland, and the United States. While extremely dominantly male, Noah has been used as a female given name as well, with Noah Cyrus being one such example.

== Variants in other languages ==
- Arabic: نُوحْ (Nūḥ)
- Aramaic: ܢܘܚ (Nūḥ)
- Armenian: Նոյ (Noy)
- Bengali: নূহ (Nooh)
- Bulgarian: Ноа (Noа)
- Catalan: Noè
- Croatian: Noa
- Czech: Noe
- Dutch: Noë
- Persian: Noa
- Finnish: Nooa
- French: Noé
- Georgian: ნოე (Noe)
- Greek: Νώε (Noé)
- Hebrew: נֹחַ (Noakh)
- Hindi: नूह (Nooh)
- Hungarian: Noé
- Icelandic: Nói
- Indonesian: Nuh, Noah
- Irish: Naoi
- Italian: Noè
- Latvian: Noass
- Lithuanian: Nojus
- Malay: Nuh
- Polish: Noe
- Portuguese: Noé
- Romanian: Noe
- Russian: Ной (Noy)
- Sicilian: Nuè
- Somali: Nuux (Nuh)
- Spanish: Noé
- Swedish: Noak
- Serbian: Ноје (Noje)
- Telugu: నోవహు (Novahu)
- Turkish: Nuh
- Yoruba: Noa
- Tamil: நாவலன் (Navalan)

== Notable people with the given name ==
=== A ===
- Noah Abatneh (born 2004), Canadian soccer player
- Noah Abich (born 1987), Kenyan footballer
- Noah Abid (born 2000), Tunisian-Dutch footballer
- Noah Ablett (1883–1935), Welsh trade unionist
- Noah Abrams (born 1998), English footballer
- Noah Adamia (1917–1942), Soviet sniper
- Noah Adams (1942–2026), American journalist
- Noah Adedeji-Sternberg (born 2005), Belgian footballer
- Noah Ajayi (born 2008), German footballer
- Noah Akwu (born 1990), Nigerian sprinter
- Noah Alexandersson (born 2001), Swedish footballer
- Noah Al-Khulaifi (born 1999), Qatari swimmer
- Noah Allen (born 2004), American soccer player
- Noah G. Allen (born 1927), American football coach
- Noah al-Qudah (1939–2010), Jordanian religious figure
- Noah Anderson (born 2001), Australian rules footballer
- Noah Answerth (born 1999), Australian rules footballer
- Noah Anyadike (born 2011), Welsh footballer
- Noah Arbit (born 1995), American politician
- Noah Armstrong (1823–1907), American miner
- Noah Ato-Zandanga (born 2003), Central African footballer
- Noah Ashenhurst (born 1972), American author
- Noah Atubolu (born 2002), German footballer
- Noah Augustine (1971–2010), Canadian activist
- Noah Awassi (born 1998), German-Beninese footballer
- Noah Awuku (born 2000), German-Ghanaian footballer
- Noah Ben Azure (born 1960), Ghanaian politician

=== B ===
- Noah Baerman (born 1975), American pianist
- Noah Baffoe (born 1993), Spanish footballer
- Noah Balta (born 1999), Australian rules footballer
- Noah Barker (born 1992), Canadian rugby union footballer
- Noah Barou (1889–1955), Ukrainian trade unionist
- Noah Bastian (born 1979), American actor
- Noah Baumbach (born 1969), American film director
- Noah Baxpöhler (born 1993), German volleyball player
- Noah Sarenren Bazee (born 1996), German-Nigerian footballer
- Noah Bean (born 1978), American actor
- Noah Beauchamp (1785–1842), American blacksmith
- Noah Beck (born 2001), American social medial personality
- Noah Becker (born 1970), Canadian-American artist
- Noah Beery (1882–1946), American actor
- Noah Beery Jr. (1913–1994), American actor
- Noah Beresin (born 1990), American music producer
- Noah Bickford (born 2004), Canadian soccer player
- Noah Biggs, English medical reformer
- Noah Billingsley (born 1997), New Zealand footballer
- Noah Bischof (born 2002), Austrian footballer
- Noah Bitsch (born 1989), German karateka
- Noah Blasucci (born 1999), Swiss-Italian footballer
- Noah Boeken (born 1981), Dutch poker player
- Noah Bögli (born 1996), Swiss cyclist
- Noah Böhringer (born 1997), German politician
- Noah Booth (born 2004), English rugby league footballer
- Noah Botic (born 2002), Australian footballer
- Noah Bowlus (1830–1904), American politician
- Noah Bowman (born 1992), Canadian skier
- Noah Bradley, American artist
- Noah Bratschi (born 2000), American rock climber
- Noah Bridges, English stenographer
- Noah Brooks (1830–1903), American journalist
- Noah Brosch (born 1948), Israeli astronomer
- Noah Brown (disambiguation), multiple people
- Noah Kenshin Browne (born 2001), Canadian-Japanese footballer
- Noah Bryant (born 1984), American shot putter
- Noah Burroughs (born 1976), American politician and football player
- Noah Burton (1896–1956), English footballer
- Noah Buschel (born 1978), American writer and director
- Noah B. Butt (1886–1956), American politician
- Noah Buxton (1876–1967), English cricketer
- Noah Henry Byington (1809–1877), American physician and politician
- Noah Cadiou (born 1998), French footballer

=== C ===
- Noah Cain (born 2000), American football player
- Noah Cameron (born 1999), American baseball player
- Noah Cantor (born 1971), Canadian football player
- Noah Cappe (born 1977), Canadian actor
- Noah Carl (born 1990), British sociologist
- Noah Carroll, Australian politician
- Noah Cates (born 1999), American ice hockey player
- Noah Caton (1897–1922), American football player
- Noah Centineo (born 1996), American actor
- Noah Charney (born 1979), American novelist
- Noah Chesmain (born 1997), English footballer
- Noah Chimpeni (born 1968), Malawian politician
- Noah Chilvers (born 2001), English footballer
- Noah Chivuta (born 1983), Zambian footballer
- Noah Cicero (born 1980), American novelist
- Noah Clarke (born 1979), American ice hockey player
- Noah B. Cloud (1809–1875), American politician
- Noah Clowney (born 2004), American basketball player
- Noah Cobb (born 2004), American soccer player
- Noah Codjo-Evora (born 2007), French footballer
- Noah Comet, American professor
- Noah D. Comstock (1832–1890), American farmer and politician
- Noah Cooke (1831–1919), English poet
- Noah Cornwell (born 2004), English cricketer
- Noah Cottrell (born 2007), American actor
- Noah Cowan (1967–2023), Canadian film executive
- Noah Crawford (born 1994), American actor
- Noah Creshevsky (1945–2020), American composer
- Noah Crétier (born 2001), French footballer
- Noah Croes (born 1999), Dutch cricketer
- Noah Cumberland (born 2001), Australian rules footballer
- Noah Curtis (Canadian football) (born 1998), American football player
- Noah Cyrus (born 2000), American singer

=== D ===
- Noah Dahlman (born 1989), American basketball player
- Noah Dalway (1746–1820), Irish naval officer
- Noah Dana-Picard (born 1954), Israeli mathematician
- Noah Danby (born 1974), Canadian actor
- Noah Darvich (born 2006), German footballer
- Noah Davis (disambiguation), multiple people
- Noah Dawkins (born 1997), American football player
- Noah Deledda (born 1978), American sculptor
- Noah Delgado (born 1979), American soccer player
- Noah De Ridder (born 2003), Belgian footballer
- Noah Dettwiler (born 2005), Swiss motorcyclist
- Noah Dickerson (born 1997), American basketball player
- Noah Dietrich (1889–1982), American businessman
- Noah Diffenbaugh (born 1974), American scientist
- Noah Diliberto (born 2001), French footballer
- Noah Dillon (born 1994), American artist
- Noah Dines (born 1995), American skier
- Noah Dobson (born 2000), Canadian ice hockey player
- Noah Dollenmayer (born 1999), American soccer player
- Noah Ernest Dorsey (1873–1959), American physicist
- Noah dos Santos (born 2002), Canadian soccer player
- Noah Droddy (born 1990), American runner
- Noah Dumbadze (1912–1983), Soviet soldier
- Noah Komla Dzobo (??–2010), Ghanaian religious leader

=== E ===
- Noah Eagle (born 1997), American sportscaster
- Noah Edjouma (born 2005), French footballer
- Noah Efron (born 1959), American-Israeli professor
- Noah Eile (born 2002), Swedish footballer
- Noah Elliott (born 1997), American Paralympic snowboarder
- Noah Elliss (born 1999), American football player
- Noah Emmerich (born 1965), American actor

=== F ===
- Noah Fadiga (born 1999), Belgian footballer
- Noah Falck (born 1977), American poet
- Noah Falstein (born 1957), American video game designer
- Noah Fant (born 1997), American football player
- Noah Farrakhan (born 2000), American basketball player
- Noah Fatar (born 2002), French footballer
- Noah Fearnley (born 1999), American actor
- Noah Feldman (born 1970), American author
- Noah Fenyő (born 2006), German footballer
- Noah Fernandez (born 2008), Belgian footballer
- Noah Henry Ferry (1831–1863), American general
- Noah Fierer, American ecologist
- Noah Fifita (born 2003), American football player
- Noah Finkelstein (born 1968), American professor
- Noah Fleiss (born 1984), American actor
- Noah Franke (born 1995), American soccer player
- Noah Frick (born 2001), Liechtensteiner footballer
- Noah Frommelt (born 2000), Liechtensteiner footballer
- Noah Fuson (born 1999), American soccer player

=== G ===
- Noah Galloway (born 1981), American soldier
- Noah Galvin (born 1994), American actor and singer
- Noah Gal Gendler (born 1957), Israeli diplomat
- Noah Ganaus (born 2001), German footballer
- Noah Gaudin (born 1999), French handball player
- Noah Georgeson (born 1975), American musician
- Noah Gettman (born 2000), American football player
- Noah Gindorff (born 1999), American football player
- Noah Glass (born 1981), American entrepreneur
- Noah Miller Glatfelter (1837–1911), American physician
- Noah Goldstein (born 1982), American record producer
- Noah Gordon (disambiguation), multiple people
- Noah Graber (born 2001), Liechtensteiner footballer
- Noah Gragson (born 1998), American stock car racing driver
- Noah Graham (1815–1885), American politician
- Noah Gray (born 1999), American football player
- Noah Gray-Cabey (born 1995), American actor
- Noah K. Green (1808–1886), American politician
- Noah Greenberg (1919–1966), American conductor
- Noah Gregor (born 1998), Canadian ice hockey player
- Noah Grove (born 1999), American ice sled hockey player
- Noah Gundersen (born 1989), American singer-songwriter

=== H ===
- Noah Haidu (born 1972), American pianist
- Noah Hallett (born 1997), Canadian football player
- Noah Hanifin (born 1997), American ice hockey player
- Noah Harlan (born 1975), American filmmaker
- Noah Harms (born 1997), Aruban footballer
- Noah Harpster (born 1976), American actor
- Noah Hasa (born 2003), Swedish ice hockey player
- Noah Hathaway (born 1971), American actor
- Noah Havard (born 2000), Australian canoeist
- Noah Hawley (born 1967), American author
- Noah Hegge (born 1999), German canoeist
- Noah Henchoz (born 2002), Swiss footballer
- Noah Herron (born 1982), American football player
- Noah Hershkowitz (1941–2020), American physicist
- Noah Heward (born 2000), English rugby union footballer
- Noah Hickey (born 1978), New Zealand footballer
- Noah Hingley (1796–1877), English industrialist
- Noah Hobbs (born 2004), English cyclist
- Noah Hodkinson (born 2005), English rugby league footballer
- Noah Hoffman (born 1989), American skier
- Noah Hood (born 1986), American lawyer
- Noah Horowitz (born 1979), American art historian
- Noah Hotham (born 2003), New Zealand rugby union footballer
- Noah Howard (1943–2010), American musician
- Noah Howes (born 2005), Australian rules footballer
- Noah Huntley (born 1974), English actor
- Noah Hutchings (1922–2015), American religious figure
- Noah Hyman, American politician

=== I ===
- Noah Ibrahim (born 1992), Nigerian entrepreneur
- Noah Idechong, Palauan activist
- Noah Igbinoghene (born 1999), American football player
- Noah Isenberg (born 1967), American professor

=== J ===
- Noah Jackson (born 1951), American football player
- Noah Jaffe (born 2003), American Paralympic swimmer
- Noah James (born 2001), Australian footballer
- Noah Jauny (born 2004), Irish footballer
- Noah John (born 2003), Swedish footballer
- Noah Z. Jones (born 1973), American animator
- Noah Jupe (born 2005), English actor
- Noah Juulsen (born 1997), Canadian ice hockey player

=== K ===
- Noah K (born 1984), American composer
- Noah Kahan (born 1997), American singer-songwriter
- Noah Kalina (born 1980), American filmmaker
- Noah Kalonji (born 2009), Belgian footballer
- Noah Kareng (born 1975), Botswanan footballer
- Noah Karunaratne (born 2003), New Zealand footballer
- Noah Babadi Kasule (born 1985), Ugandan footballer
- Noah Katterbach (born 2001), German footballer
- Noah Keen (1920–2019), American actor
- Noah Kibet (born 2004), Kenyan runner
- Noah Kim (born 2001), American football player
- Noah Kin (born 1994), Finnish-Nigerian rapper
- Noah Mawete Kinsiona (born 2005), Belgian footballer
- Noah Klieger (1925–2018), Israeli journalist
- Noah Knigga (born 2006), American football player
- Noah O. Knight (1929–1951), American soldier
- Noah Kool (born 1962), Papua New Guinean politician
- Noah Korczowski (born 1994), German footballer
- Noah Kuavita (born 1999), Belgian artistic gymnast

=== L ===
- Noah Laba (born 2003), American ice hockey player
- Noah Lafornara (born 2004), American ice dancer
- Noah LaLonde (born 1998), American actor
- Noah Lamanna (born 1991), Canadian actor
- Noah Law (born 1994), British politician
- Noah Leddel (born 2003), Filipino-English footballer
- Noah Lennox (born 1978), American musician
- Noah Levenson (born 1981), American computer programmer
- Noah Levine (born 1971), American teacher
- Noah Michael Levine (born 1962), American voice actor
- Noah Lewis (disambiguation), multiple people
- Noah Lisle (born 2007), Australian racing driver
- Noah Locke (born 1999), American basketball player
- Noah Lolesio (born 1999), Australian rugby union footballer
- Noah Lomax (born 2001), American actor
- Noah Long (born 2004), Australian rules footballer
- Noah Loosli (born 1997), Swiss footballer
- Noah Lor, American politician
- Noah Lowry (born 1980), American baseball player
- Noah Ludlow (1795–1886), American actor
- Noah Lukeman (born 1973), American author
- Noah Lundström (born 1999), Finnish footballer
- Noah Lyles (born 1997), American sprinter
- Noah Lyon (born 1979), American artist

=== M ===
- Noah Madsen (born 2001), Danish footballer
- Noah Makembo-Ntemo (born 2007), Belgian footballer
- Noah Malone (born 2001), American Paralympic athlete
- Noah Mann (1756–1789), English cricketer
- Noah Maposa (born 1985), Botswanan footballer
- Noah Markmann (born 2007), Danish footballer
- Noah Martey (born 1995), Ghanaian footballer
- Noah Martin (disambiguation), multiple people
- Noah Marullo (born 1999), British actor
- Noah Mascoll-Gomes (born 1999), Antiguan swimmer
- Noah M. Mason (1882–1965), American politician
- Noah Mawene (born 2005), English footballer
- Noah Mbamba (born 2005), Belgian footballer
- Noah Mbuyamba (born 1998), Dutch Paralympic athlete
- Noah McCourt (born 1994), American activist
- Noah C. McFarland (1822–1897), American politician
- Noah McFadyen (born 2003), Australian cricketer
- Noah Mckay (1956–2009), Iranian-American physician
- Noah Meier (born 2002), Swiss ice hockey player
- Noah Merl (born 1983), American soccer player
- Noah Michel (born 1995), German footballer
- Noah Mickens (born 1974), American performance artist
- Noah Miller (disambiguation), multiple people
- Noah Mills (born 1983), Canadian model and actor
- Noah Mintz (born 1970), Canadian singer-songwriter
- Noah Mneney (born 2002), Faroese footballer
- Noah Monteiro (born 2009), Portuguese racing driver
- Noah Mozes (1912–1985), Israeli publisher
- Noah Mraz (born 2006), Australian rules footballer
- Noah Mullins (1918–1998), American football player
- Noah Munck (born 1996), American actor
- Noah Murdock (born 1998), American baseball player
- Noah Musingku (1964–2026), Papua New Guinean con artist

=== N ===
- Noah Nadje (born 2003), French footballer
- Noah Nartey (born 2005), Dutch footballer
- Noah Naujoks (born 2002), Dutch footballer
- Noah Naylor (born 2000), Canadian baseball player
- Noah Nene (born 2004), French rugby union footballer
- Noah Newby, American politician
- Noah Ngeny (born 1978), Kenyan athlete
- Noah Dower Nilsson (born 2006), Swedish ice hockey player
- Noah Noble (1794–1844), American politician
- Noah North (1809–1880), American painter
- Noah Norton (1786–1877), American prospector
- Noah Nsoki (born 2007), French footballer
- Noah Nurmi (born 2001), Finnish footballer

=== O ===
- Noah Ohio (born 2003), Dutch-English footballer
- Noah Okafor (born 2000), Swiss footballer
- Noah Oppenheim (born 1978), American television producer
- Noah Östlund (born 2004), Swedish ice hockey player
- Noah Webster Overstreet (1888–1973), American architect

=== P ===
- Noah Pagden (born 2001), Australian footballer
- Noah Pallas (born 2001), Finnish footballer
- Noah Palmer (born 1983), American soccer player
- Noah Paravicini (born 1997), American soccer player
- Noah W. Parden (1868–1944), American attorney and politician
- Noah Parker (born 1998), Canadian actor
- Noah Pauley, American football coach
- Noah Penda (born 2005), French basketball player
- Noah Persson (born 2003), Swedish footballer
- Noah Phelps (1740–1809), American general
- Noah Phelps (Wisconsin politician) (1808–1896), American politician
- Noah Phillips (born 2004), English footballer
- Noah J. Phillips (born 1978), American attorney
- Noah Pickus (born 1964), American professor
- Noah Picton (born 1995), Canadian football player
- Noah Pilato (born 1996), American soccer player
- Noah Pink (born 1983), American screenwriter
- Noah Plume (born 1996), German footballer
- Noah Porter (1811–1892), American writer
- Noah Powder (born 1998), American soccer player
- Noah Pransky, American news correspondent
- Noah Preminger (born 1986), American saxophonist
- Noah Prince (1797–1872), American politician and judge
- Noah Pritzker (born 1986), American film director
- Noah Purcell (born 1980), American attorney
- Noah Purifoy (1917–2004), American artist

=== R ===
- Noah Raby (1822–1904), American longevity claimant
- Noah Raford (born 1978), American futurist
- Noah Raveyre (born 2005), French footballer
- Noah Reid (born 1987), Canadian actor and musician
- Noah Reynolds (born 2002), American basketball player
- Noah Richler, Canadian author
- Noah Ringer (born 1996), American actor
- Noah Rinker, American singer-songwriter
- Noah Ritter (born 2008), American internet personality
- Noah Robbins (born 1990), American actor
- Noah Robertson (born 1983), American drummer
- Noah Roberts-Thomson (born 2007), Australian rules footballer
- Noah Robinson (born 1978), American politician
- Noah Rod (born 1996), Swiss ice hockey player
- Noah Rogers (born 2005), American football player
- Noah John Rondeau (1883–1967), American hermit
- Noah Hamilton Rose (1874–1952), American painter
- Noah Rosenberg, American geneticist
- Noah Rothman (born 1981), American political commentator
- Noah Rubin (disambiguation), multiple people
- Noah Rupp (born 2003), Swiss footballer

=== S ===
- Noah Sadaoui (born 1993), Moroccan footballer
- Noah Sadiki (born 2004), Belgian footballer
- Noah Sahsah (born 2005), Danish footballer
- Noah Salakae, Motswana politician
- Noah Sanford (born 1990), American attorney and politician
- Noah Saviolo (born 2004), Portuguese footballer
- Noah W. Sawyer (1877–1957), American educator and politician
- Noah Scalin (born 1972), American artist
- Noah Schachter (born 1999), American tennis player
- Noah Scherer (born 1992), Swiss skater
- Noah Schnacky (born 1997), American singer-songwriter
- Noah Schnapp (born 2004), American actor
- Noah Schneeberger (born 1988), Swiss ice hockey player
- Noah Schultz (born 2003), American baseball player
- Noah Schwartz (born 1983), American poker player
- Noah Ryan Scott (born 2000), Canadian actor
- Noah Sebastian (born 1995), American singer
- Noah Segan (born 1983), American actor
- Noah Sete (born 1981), Australian rugby league footballer
- Noah Sewell (born 2002), American football player
- Noah Shachtman (born 1977), American journalist
- Noah Shain, American record producer
- Noah Shakespeare (1839–1921), Canadian politician
- Noah Shamoun (born 2002), Danish footballer
- Noah Shannon (born 2000), American football player
- Noah Sheldon (born 1975), American photographer
- Noah Shepard (born 1986), American football player
- Noah Sife (born 1984), American actor
- Noah Simmons, Welsh footballer
- Noah Skaalum (born 1995), Danish singer
- Noah Skirrow (born 1988), Canadian baseball player
- Noah Smith (disambiguation), multiple people
- Noah Smithwick (1808–1899), American colonist
- Noah Söderberg (born 2001), Swiss footballer
- Noah Solomon (born 1973), Israeli-American musician
- Noah Solskjær (born 2000), Norwegian footballer
- Noah Song (born 1997), American baseball player
- Noah Spence (born 1994), American football player
- Noah Spinner, American politician
- Noah Starkey (born 1997), American basketball player
- Noah Steen (born 2004), Norwegian ice hockey player
- Noah Steiner (born 1999), Austrian footballer
- Noah Stephens (born 2004), English rugby league footballer
- Noah Stewart (born 1978), American tenor
- Noah Stoddard (1755–1850), American privateer
- Noah Stollman (born 1966), Israeli screenwriter
- Noah Streit (born 2005), Swiss footballer
- Noah Strømsted (born 2007), Danish racing driver
- Noah Strycker (born 1986), American birdwatcher
- Noah Sonko Sundberg (born 1996), Swedish footballer
- Noah Haynes Swayne (1804–1884), American politician
- Noah S. Sweat (1922–1996), American judge
- Noah Syndergaard (born 1992), American baseball player

=== T ===
- Noah Taylor (born 1969), English-Australian actor
- Noah Taylor (American football) (born 1999), American football player
- Noah Tepperberg (born 1975), American businessman
- Noah Thain (born 2005), English cricketer
- Noah Thomas (1720–1792), Welsh physician
- Noah Thomas (American football) (born 2004), American football player
- Noah Thomasson (born 2001), American basketball player
- Noah Davis Thompson (??–1933), American writer
- Noah Timmins (1867–1936), Canadian mining financier
- Noah Togiai (born 1997), American football player
- Noah Tolf (born 2005), Swedish footballer
- Noah Nirmal Tom (born 1994), Indian athlete
- Noah Toribio (born 1999), English footballer
- Noah Troyer (1831–1886), American farmer
- Noah Andre Trudeau (born 1949), American historian

=== U ===
- Noah Ukwuije (born 2007), French footballer
- Noah Urrea (born 2001), American actor

=== V ===
- Noah Vandenbranden (born 2002), Belgian cyclist
- Noah Van Sciver (born 1984), American cartoonist
- Noah Verhoeven (born 1999), Canadian soccer player
- Noah Virgin (1812–1892), American miller
- Noah Vonleh (born 1995), American basketball player
- Noah Vucsics (born 2000), Canadian Paralympic long jumper

=== W ===
- Noah Waddell (born 2001), American pianist
- Noah Wadsworth (born 2005), English footballer
- Noah Wafula (born 1990), Kenyan footballer
- Noah Wallace (born 1991), American skier
- Noah Wardrip-Fruin (born 1972), American professor
- Noah Warren (born 1989), Canadian-American poet
- Noah Warren (ice hockey) (born 2004), Canadian ice hockey player
- Noah Watts (born 1983), American actor
- Noah Webster (1758–1843), American lexicographer
- Noah Weißhaupt (born 2001), German footballer
- Noah Wekesa (born 1936), Kenyan politician
- Noah Welch (born 1982), American ice hockey player
- Noah Wenger (1934–2024), American politician
- Noah Whittington (born 2001), American football player
- Noah Williams (disambiguation), multiple people
- Noah Williamson (born 2002), Latvian basketball player
- Noah Wilson-Rich (born 1980), American biologist
- Noah Wolff (1809–1907), German industrialist
- Noah Worcester (1758–1837), American clergyman
- Noah Wunsch (born 1970), German painter
- Noah Wyle (born 1971), American actor

=== Y ===
- Noah Yap (born 1993), Singaporean actor
- Noah Young (1887–1958), American weightlifter
- Noah Yusuf (born 1964), Nigerian academic

=== Z ===
- Noah Zane (1778–1833), American politician
- Noah Zerr (born 1998), Canadian football player

== Fictional characters ==
- Noah Bennet from Heroes
- Noah Bennett from Passions
- Noah Claypole from Oliver Twist
- Noah Ellis, a Season 1 contestant in Fetch! with Ruff Ruffman
- Noah from Goddess of Victory: Nikke
- Noah Lawson from Home and Away
- Noah Newman from The Young and the Restless
- Noah van Helsing from Marvel Comics
- Noah from Total Drama
- Noah from Xenoblade Chronicles 3
- Noah Solloway from The Affair

== Notable people with the surname ==
- Akie Noah, Sierra Leonean footballer
- Barbara Noah (born 1949), American sculptor
- Chris Noah (born 1995), Latvian singer and songwriter
- David Noah, Indonesian keyboardist
- George Noah (born 1957), Nigerian journalist
- Harith Noah (born 1993), Indian motorsports athlete
- Harold J. Noah (1925–2019), American educator
- Joakim Noah (born 1985), French-American basketball player
- John Noah (1927–2015), American ice hockey player
- Kalleem Noah (1868–1952), Lebanese-Canadian businessman
- Lau Noah (born 1994), Spanish musician
- Max W. Noah (1932–2018), American lieutenant general
- Mohamed Abdullahi Hassan Noah, Somali politician
- Mordecai Manuel Noah (1785–1851), American playwright
- Nutty Noah, English entertainer
- Olajuwon Noah (born 1989), Samoan rugby union footballer
- Peter Noah, American television producer
- Rahah Noah (1933–2020), Malaysian social figure
- Timothy Noah (born 1958), American writer
- Trevor Noah (born 1984), South African comedian
- Uki Noah (born 1981), Indonesian guitarist
- William Noah (born 1944), Canadian politician
- Yannick Noah (born 1960), French tennis player
- Zacharie Noah (1937–2017), Cameroonian footballer

== See also ==
- Noa (disambiguation)
- Noah (disambiguation)
