= Deledda =

Deledda is an Italian surname. Notable people with the surname include:

- Adolphe Deledda (1919–2003), Italian cyclist
- Alessio Deledda (born 1994), Italian racing driver
- Grazia Deledda (1871–1936), Italian writer
- Noah Deledda (born 1977), American artist

== See also ==
- Deledda International School, a school in Genoa, Italy
