= Milton W. Hopkins =

American painter

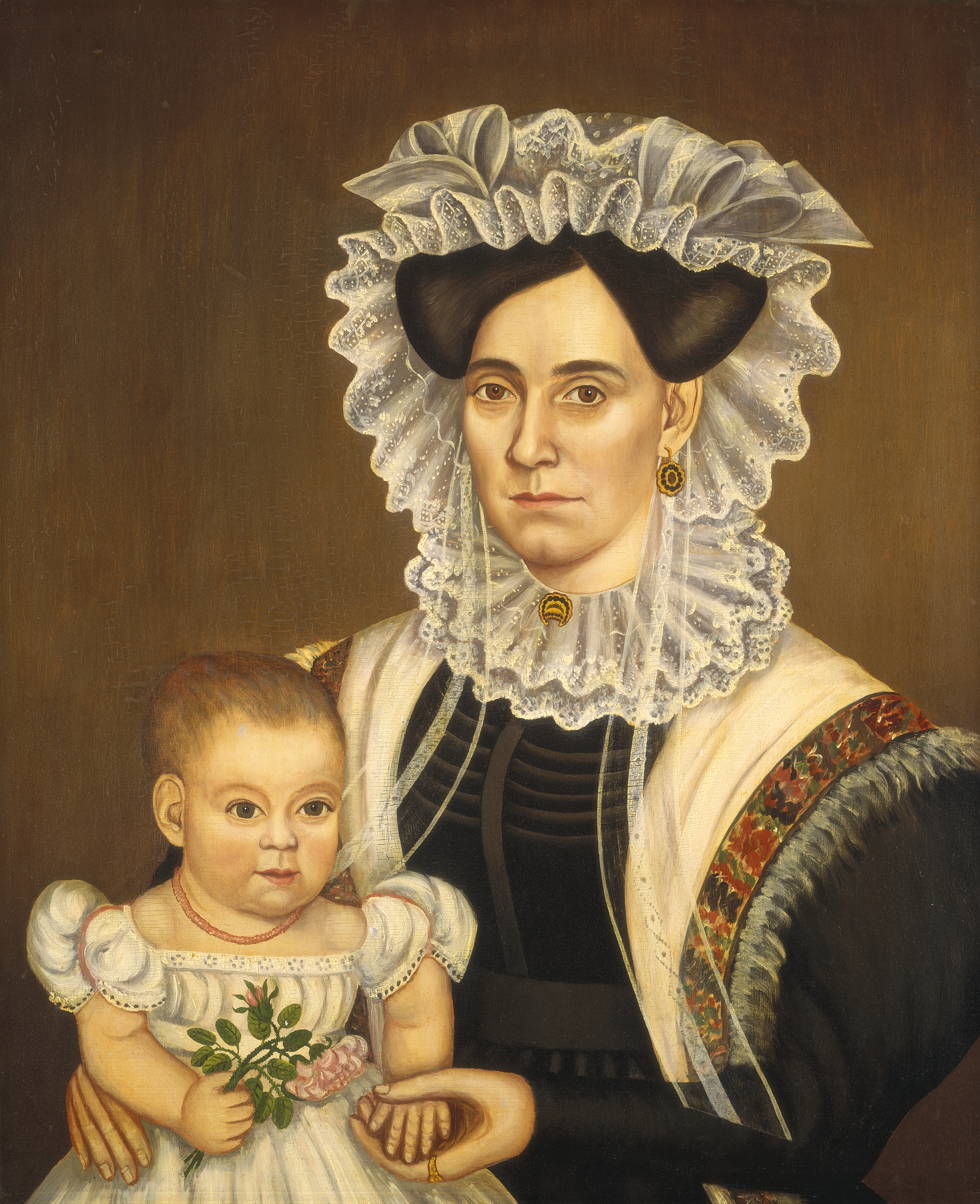
Aphia Salisbury Rich (1793-1868) and Baby Edward

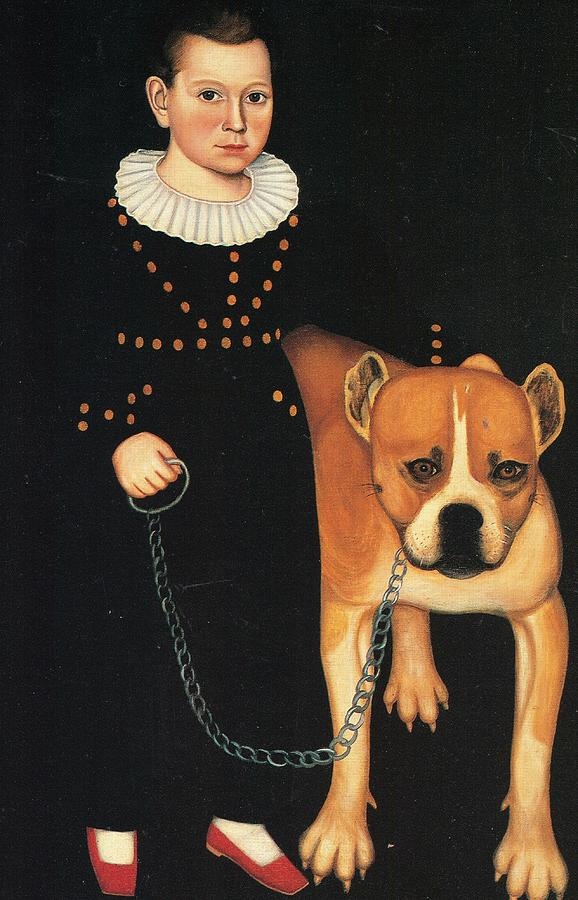
Pierrepont Lacey (1832-1888) and his Dog "Gun"

Milton William Hopkins (1 August 1789 - 24 April 1844) was an American portrait painter in the folk art tradition.

== Biography ==
He was born in Harwinton, Connecticut, one of the eight children of Hezekiah and Eunice Hopkins. In 1800, when he was eleven, the family moved to Clinton, New York, but by 1807 he was back in Connecticut, where he married Abigail Pollard of Guilford, with whom he had a son. She died in 1817. He then married Almira Adkins (1794-1861) and moved to Evans Mills, New York. They eventually had nine children, of whom five survived to maturity. During this time, it appears that he was primarily occupied in farming.

In 1823, he and his family moved to Newport, New York. The following year, he placed an advertisement in that city's newspaper (the Patriot) offering his services in house and sign painting, gilding, glazing and chair-making. He also sold painting supplies and apparently served for a brief period as a captain on a canal boat. Soon, however, he appeared in Richmond, Virginia, where he promoted himself as an instructor for women in theorem stencil, popularly known as "Poonah painting". It is likely that he was also employed as an assistant at a local women's art academy that taught painting on velvet and other fancy work.

He returned to New York in 1829. Four years later, he advertised himself as an art teacher and portrait painter. His first known work, a portrait of an unidentified man, dates from that year. Although it has not been firmly established, he may have been acquainted with, and possibly took some lessons from Ammi Phillips, an itinerant portrait painter who was from the same part of Connecticut.

He moved to Ohio in 1836; first to Cleveland, then to Williamsburg near Cincinnati, where he purchased a farm. Soon after, he was apparently exposed to Academic style portrait painting and his faces became more detailed. An advertisement in the Daily Ohio Statesman from 1839 indicates that he had a studio in Columbus, but a few years later he was evidently working in the South; notably in Mississippi. He was strongly opposed to slavery, so this may have been connected to his work with the Underground Railroad. He was also involved in the Temperance Movement and the Anti-Masonic Party, although he had once been a Mason himself. In addition to his self-promotion, he made many professional contacts through his active participation in the Presbyterian Church.

His last signed work dates from 1841. He was back in Cincinnati by 1843 and once again began advertising his services. He died there of pneumonia the following year. His works are occasionally confused with those of Noah North, who worked in some of the same areas and may have been apprenticed to Hopkins at some point.

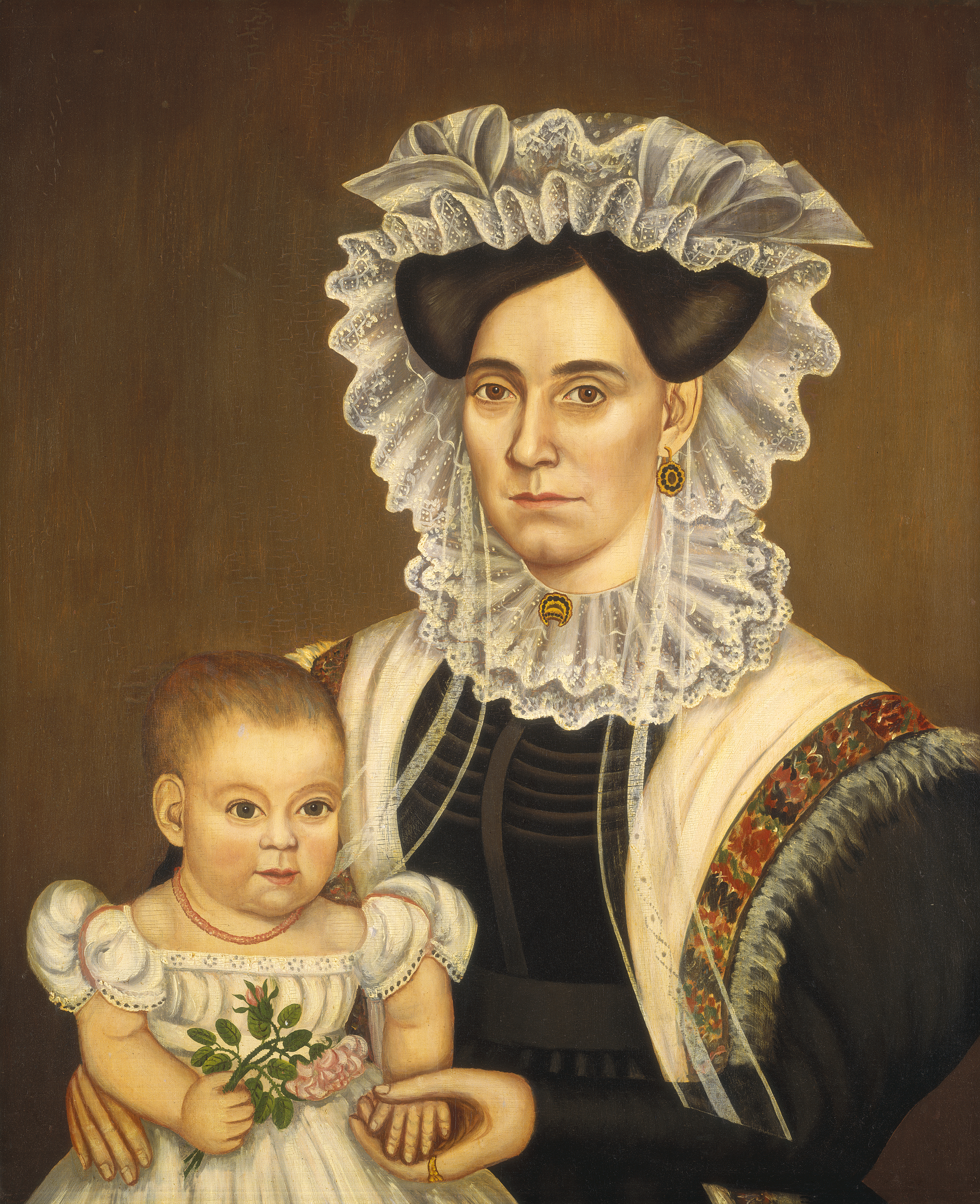

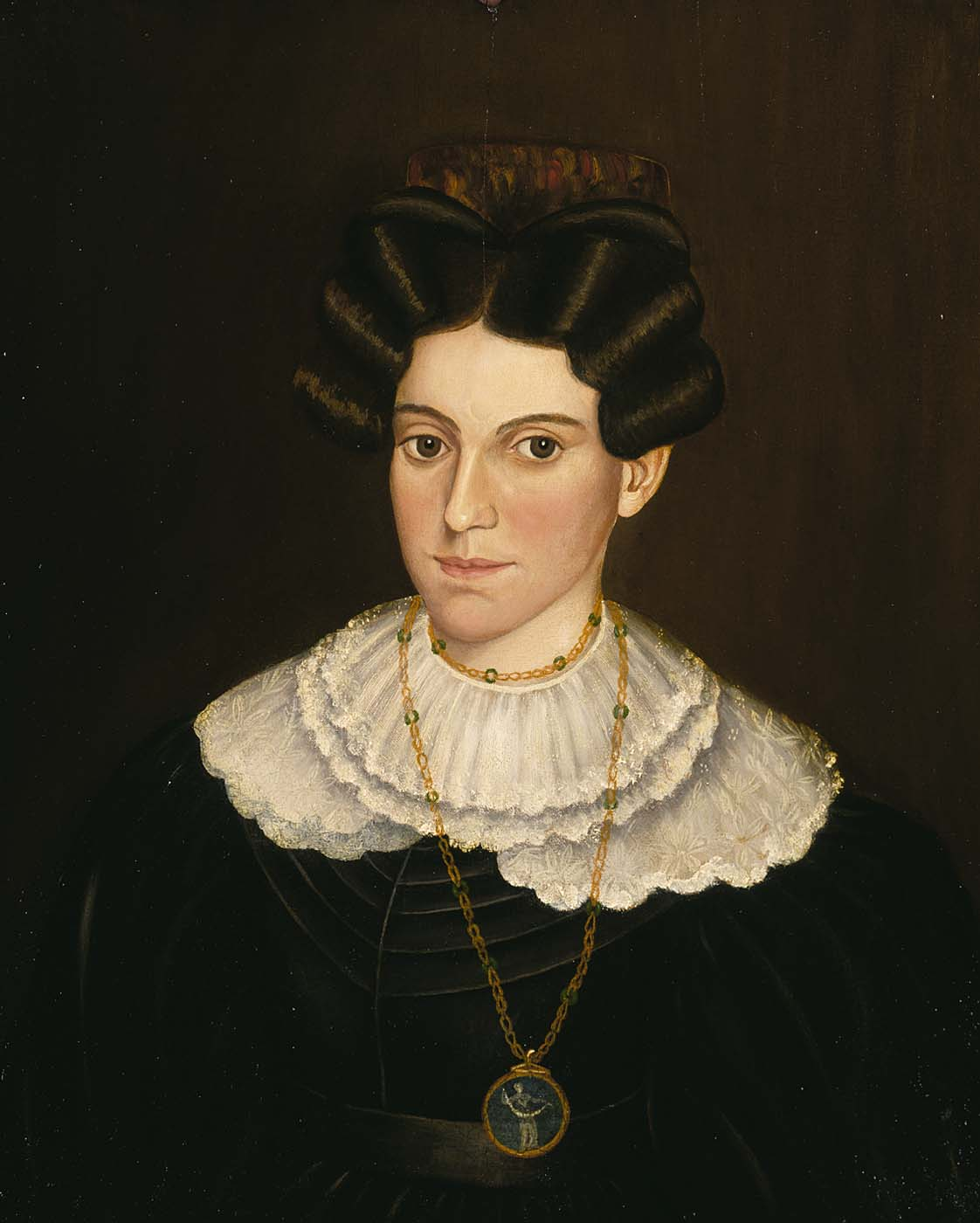

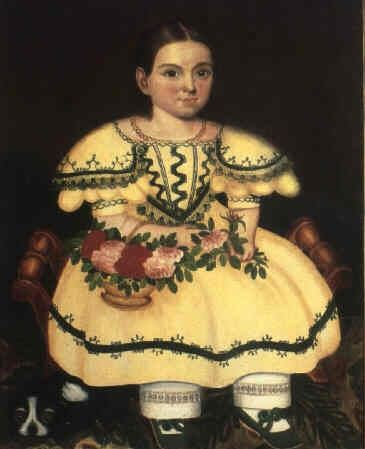

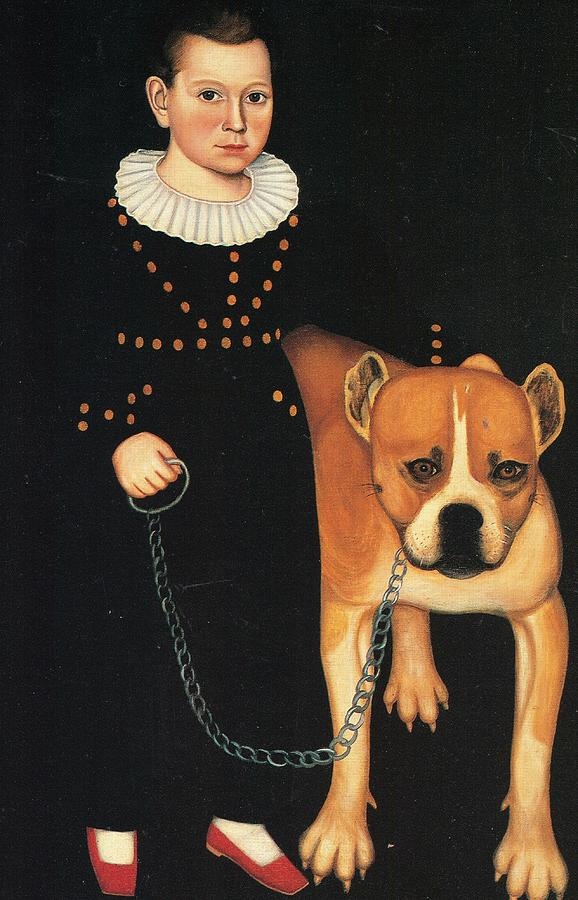

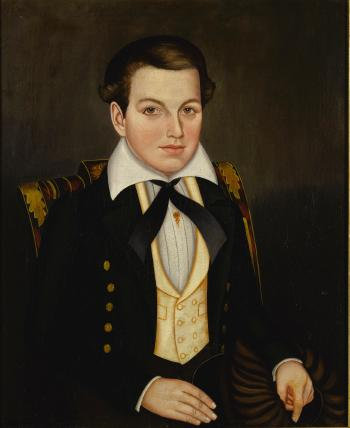

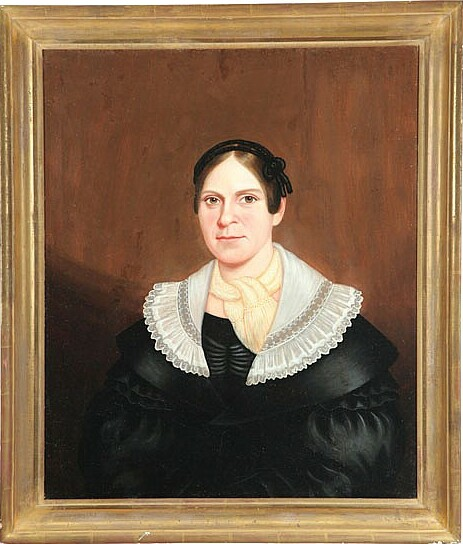
