= Babs Fafunwa =

Nigerian academic (1923–2010)

Aliu Babs Fafunwa
- Born: September 23, 1923; Isale Eko, Lagos, Nigeria
- Died: October 11, 2010 (aged 87); Abuja
- Known for: Education
- Awards: NNOM
- Scientific career
- Workplaces: University of Nigeria

Aliu Babatunde Fafunwa (23 September, 1923 – 11 October, 2010). He was the first Nigerian Professor of Education in Nigeria. He was a Nigerian Educationist, Scholar and Former Minister for Education. As Minister, he was in charge of the biggest school system in Africa. He is known for his early writings on the need to re-appraise the inherited colonial epistemological system in Nigeria and to introduce relevant cultural goals, subjects and local languages into the system, in order to accommodate the developmental and cultural pattern of the country. He is also a notable authority on the History of Educational Planning in Nigeria.

== Early life and education ==
Born on September 23, 1923, in Isale Eko, Lagos, Fafunwa had his secondary education at the CMS Grammar School, Lagos between 1937 and 1943. He obtained a B.Sc. (Magna Cum Laude) in Social Science and English from Bethune Cookman College (now Bethune-Cookman University, Florida, United States in 1950 and had his M.A (Cum Laude) in Administration and Higher Education in 1955. He earned a Ph.D. in education from New York University in 1958, becoming the first Nigerian recipient of a doctoral degree in education. He was a co-founder of the Muslim Students Society of Nigeria.

== Career ==
He started his career in 1961 at the University of Nigeria (UNN), Nsukka. During the Nigerian Civil War, he left the east and moved to Ife, and taught at the Obafemi Awolowo University.

He became a professor of education in 1966 and held the position of Dean, Faculty and Head, Department of Education at the University of Nigeria, Nsukka, UNN. Due to his brilliance and hard work, he rose to the position of Acting Vice Chancellor at both UNN and University of Ife (now Obafemi Awolowo University). He was also Pro-Chancellor and Chairman of Governing Council, University of Calabar. He was at several times, President, Association of Teachers Education in Africa, Director, International Council on Education for Teaching, Washington D C. He retired from active teaching service in 1978 to start the first tutorial college in Nigeria in 1982. During his time as Minister of Education between 1990 and 1992, he oversaw the establishment of the Nigeria French Language Village as an inter-university centre for French studies in Nigeria.

While at Nsukka, in collaboration with his colleagues at the education department, the department drafted a proposal to admit grade II teachers into a new two year degree program at the Faculty of Education. The proposal was subsequently adopted and in a few years led to the emergence of the Nigerian Certificate of Education and further broadened the acceptance of Colleges of Education in the university system; today a lot of the colleges are affiliated with universities. He also continued an innovative tradition, already in existence at Nsukka, when he began to implement a curriculum for granting a bachelor's degree in education, the first faculty in the country to do so. A process which will further expand the career potential of many teachers.

In 1977, a long time proposal of his to incorporate native languages into pedagogy was finally accepted. Today, most Nigerians learn at least one Nigerian language. Fafunwa and a few other African educationists, had argued that embracing whole heartedly without evaluation foreign systems of education and epistemology, can create the potential for epistemological dis-orientation. Introducing, cultural objectives and environmental familiarity will provide a continuity and balance into the educational advancement of a child and his place in his community.

Babs Fafunwa died in the early hours of 11 October 2010, at a hospital in Abuja, the Nigerian Federal Capital Territory and was buried in Lagos.

== Selected works ==
- A History of Nigerian Higher Education, Macmillan.
- History of Education in Nigeria, 1970. ISBN 0-04-370047-0
- New Perspectives in African Education, 1967
- Education in Mother Tongue: The Ife Primary Education Research Project, 1970-1978 (Editor)
- Up and On: A Nigerian Teacher's Odyssey, 1991. ISBN 978-153-096-0
- Memoirs of a Nigerian Minister of Education, Macmillan (Nigeria), 1998. ISBN 978-018-259-4
- Sense and non-sense in Nigerian Education, 1998
