= Community college =

Form of undergraduate higher education

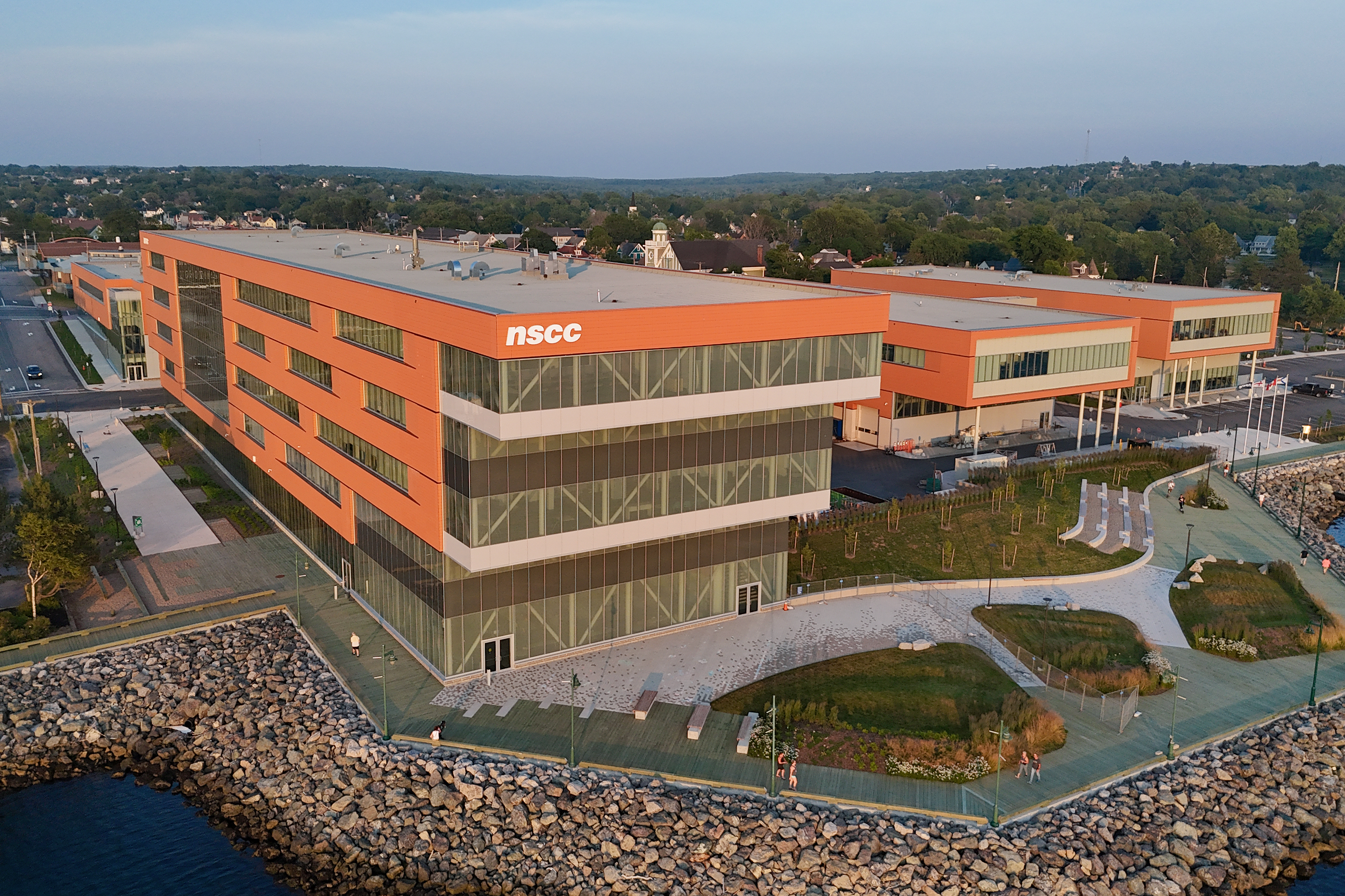
Nova Scotia Community College Waterfront Campus in Sydney, Nova Scotia

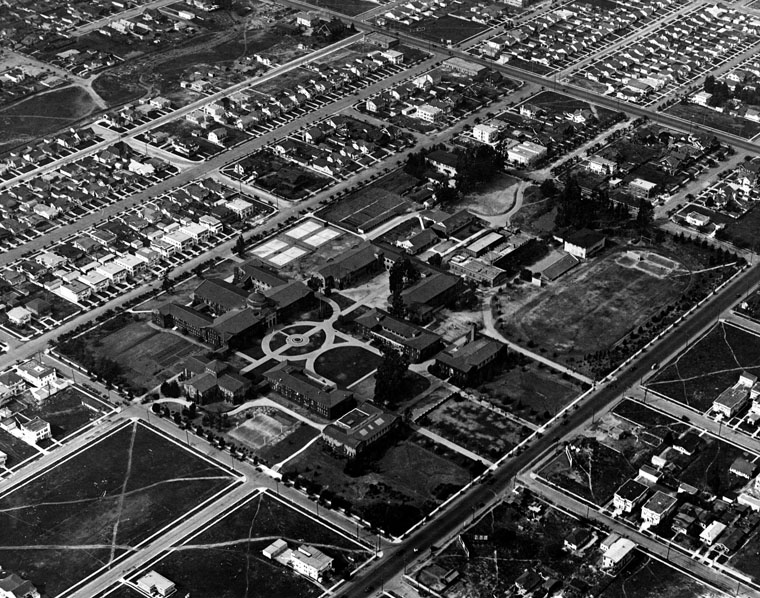
Los Angeles City College campus in East Hollywood, California, c. 1922

A community college is a type of undergraduate higher education institution, generally leading to an associate degree, certificate, or diploma. The term can have different meanings in different countries: many community colleges have an open enrollment policy for students who have graduated from high school, also known as senior secondary school or upper secondary school. The term usually refers to a higher educational institution that provides workforce education and college transfer academic programs. Some institutions maintain athletic teams and dormitories similar to their university counterparts.

== Australia ==
In Australia, the term "community college" refers to small private businesses running short (e.g. six weeks) courses generally of a self-improvement or hobbyist nature. Equivalent to the American notion of community colleges are Technical and Further Education colleges or TAFEs; these are institutions regulated mostly at state and territory level. There are also an increasing number of private providers colloquially called "colleges".

TAFEs and other providers carry on the tradition of adult education, which was established in Australia around the mid-19th century, when evening classes were held to help adults enhance their numeracy and literacy skills. Most Australian universities can also be traced back to such forerunners, although obtaining a university charter has always changed their nature. In TAFEs and colleges today, courses are designed for personal development of an individual or for employment outcomes. Educational programs cover a variety of topics such as arts, languages, business and lifestyle. They usually are scheduled to run two, three or four days of the week, depending on the level of the course undertaken. A Certificate I may only run for 4 hours twice a week for a term of 9 weeks. A full-time Diploma course might have classes 4 days per week for a year (36 weeks). Some courses may be offered in the evenings or weekends to accommodate people working full-time. Funding for colleges may come from government grants and course fees. Many are not-for-profit organizations. Such TAFES are located in metropolitan, regional and rural locations of Australia.

Education offered by TAFEs and colleges has changed over the years. By the 1980s, many colleges had recognized a community need for computer training. Since then thousands of people have increased skills through IT courses. The majority of colleges by the late 20th century had also become Registered Training Organisations. They offer individuals a nurturing, non-traditional education venue to gain skills that better prepare them for the workplace and potential job openings. TAFEs and colleges have not traditionally offered bachelor's degrees, instead providing pathway arrangements with universities to continue towards degrees. The American innovation of the associate degree is being developed at some institutions. Certificate courses I to IV, diplomas and advanced diplomas are typically offered, the latter deemed equivalent to an undergraduate qualification, albeit typically in more vocational areas. Recently, some TAFE institutes (and private providers) have also become higher education providers in their own right and are now starting to offer bachelor's degree programs.

== Canada ==
In Canada, colleges are adult educational institutions that provide higher education and tertiary education, and grant certificates and diplomas. Alternatively, Canadian colleges are often called "institutes" or "polytechnic institutes". As well, in Ontario, the 24 colleges of applied arts and technology have been mandated to offer their own stand-alone degrees as well as to offer joint degrees with universities through "articulation agreements" that often result in students emerging with both a diploma and a degree. Thus, for example, the University of Guelph "twins" with Humber College and York University does the same with Seneca College. More recently, however, colleges have been offering a variety of their own degrees, often in business, technology, science, and other technical fields. Each province has its own educational system, as prescribed by the Canadian federalism model of governance. In the mid-1960s and early 1970s, most Canadian colleges began to provide practical education and training for the emerging and booming generation, and for immigrants from around the world who were entering Canada in increasing numbers at that time. A formative trend was the merging of the then separate vocational training and adult education (night school) institutions.

Canadian colleges are either publicly funded or private post-secondary institutions (run for profit).

In terms of academic pathways, Canadian colleges and universities collaborate with each other with the purpose of providing college students the opportunity to academically upgrade their education. Students can transfer their diplomas and earn transfer credits through their completed college credits towards undergraduate university degrees.

The term associate degree is used in Western Canada to refer to a two-year college arts or science degree, similar to how the term is used in the United States. In other parts of Canada, the term advanced degree is used to indicate a three- or four-year college program.

In Quebec, three years is the norm for a university degree because a year of credit is earned in the CÉGEP (college) system. Even when speaking in English, people often refer to all colleges as Cégeps; however, the term is an acronym more correctly applied specifically to the French-language public system: Collège d'enseignement général et professionnel (CEGEP); in English: College of General and Vocational Education. The word "college" can also refer to a private high school in Quebec.

Canadian community college systems

- List of colleges in Canada
- Colleges and Institutes Canada (CICan) – publicly funded educational institutions; formerly the Association of Canadian Community Colleges (ACCC)
- National Association of Career Colleges – privately funded educational institutions; formerly the Association of Canadian Career Colleges

== India ==
In India, 98 community colleges are recognized by the University Grants Commission. The courses offered by these colleges are diplomas, advance diplomas and certificate courses. The duration of these courses usually ranges from six months to two years.

== Malaysia ==
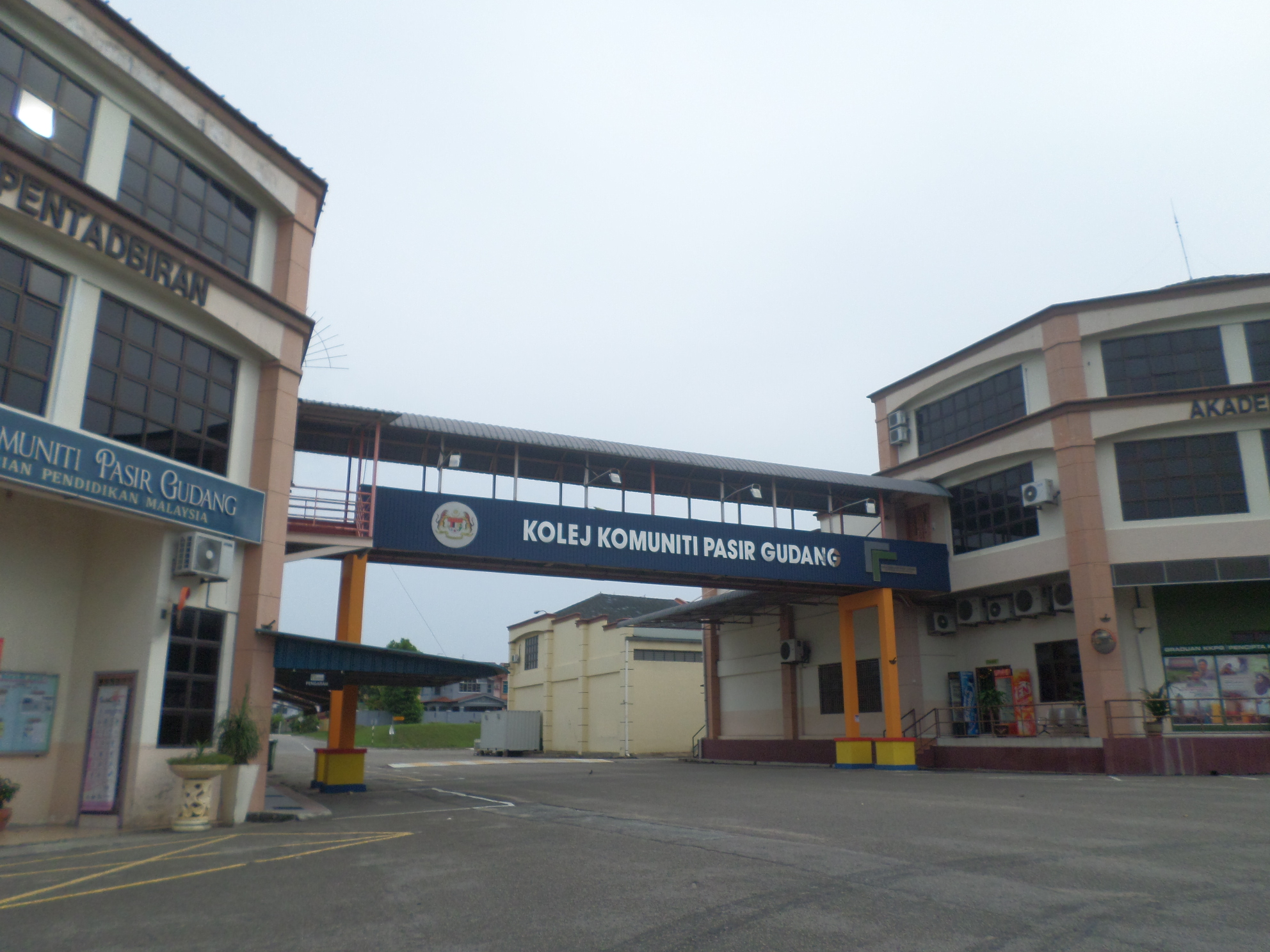
A community college in Johor, Malaysia

Community colleges in Malaysia are a network of educational institutions whereby vocational and technical skills training could be provided at all levels for school leavers before they entered the workforce. The community colleges also provide an infrastructure for rural communities to gain skills training through short courses as well as providing access to a post-secondary education.

At the moment, most community colleges award qualifications up to Level 3 in the Malaysian Qualifications Framework (Certificate 3) in both the Skills sector (Sijil Kemahiran Malaysia or the Malaysian Skills Certificate) as well as the Vocational and Training sector but the number of community colleges that are starting to award Level 4 qualifications (Diploma) are increasing. This is two levels below a bachelor's degree (Level 6 in the MQF) and students within the system who intend to further their studies to that level will usually seek entry into Advanced Diploma programs in public universities, polytechnics or accredited private providers.

== Philippines ==
In the Philippines, a community school functions as an elementary or secondary school at daytime, and towards the end of the day converts into a community college. This type of institution offers night classes under the supervision of the same regular principal and faculty members who are given part-time college teaching loads.

The concept of a community college dates to the former Ministry of Education, Culture and Sports (MECS; reorganised as a Department in 1987 and now the DepEd since 2001), which had under it the Bureaus of Elementary Education, Secondary Education, Higher Education and Vocational-Technical (Voc-Tech) Education. Former Secretary of Education Cecilio Putong wrote in 1971 how a community school is a school established in the community, by the community, and for the community itself. Pedro T. Orata of Pangasinan shared this idea, hence the establishment of the City College of Urdaneta.

A community college like the one in Abuyog, Leyte can operate with a ₱124,000 annual budget, using a two-storey building with a capacity for 700 students.

== United Kingdom ==
Community colleges roughly equate to Further Education (FE) colleges in the United Kingdom and Ireland.

The term "community college" is rarely used in the United Kingdom. When it is, a community college is a school which not only provides education for the school-age population (11–18) of the locality, but also additional services and education to adults and other members of the community. This education includes but is not limited to sports, adult literacy and lifestyle education.

== United States ==
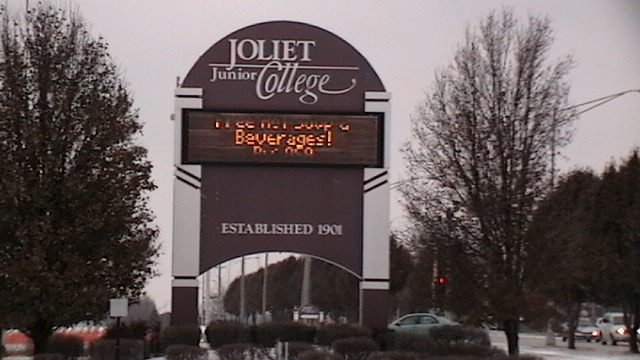
The main campus of Joliet Junior College in Joliet, Illinois, established in 1901 as the first community college in the U.S.

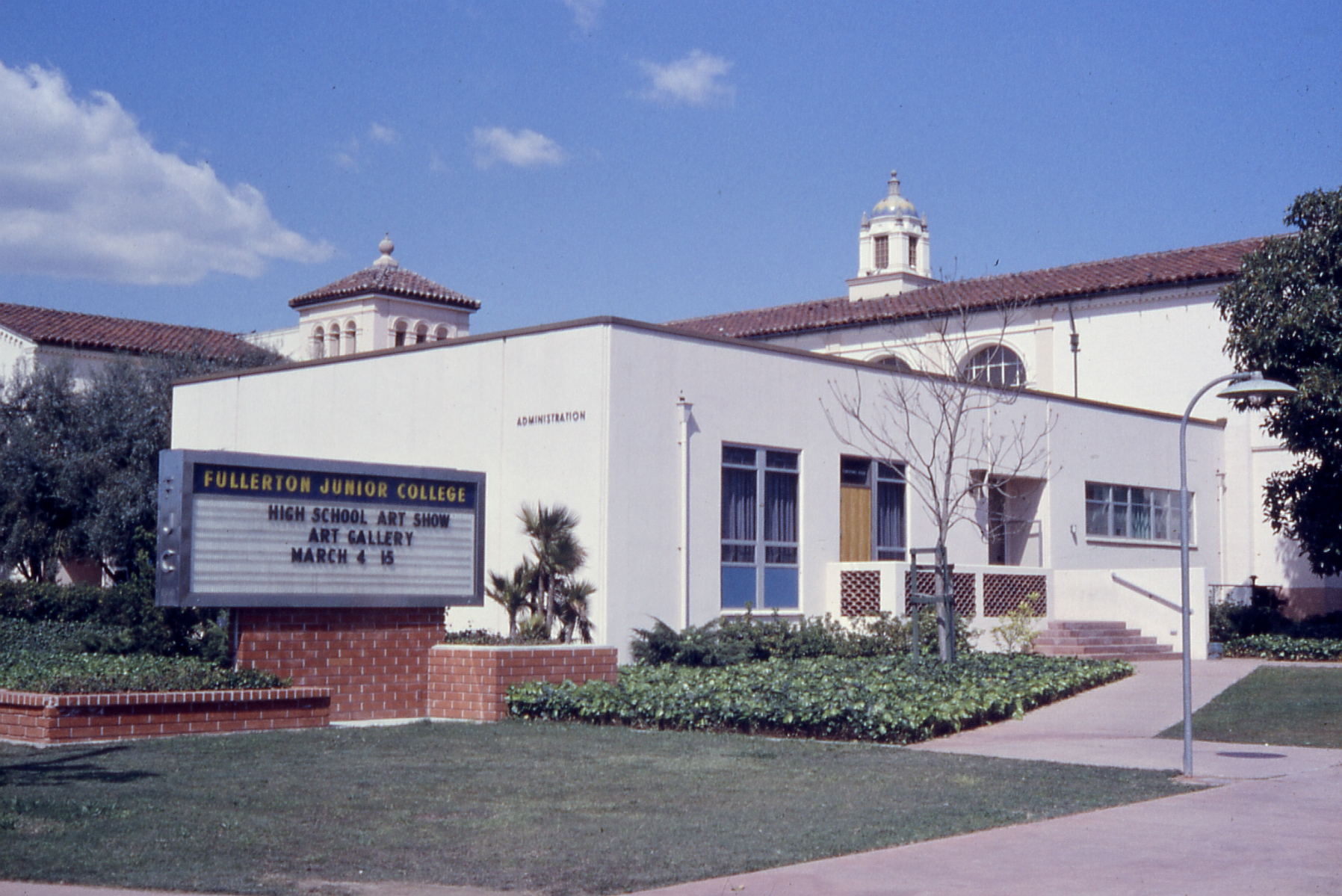
Fullerton College in Fullerton, California, has been in continuous operation since 1913, making it the longest-operating community college in California.

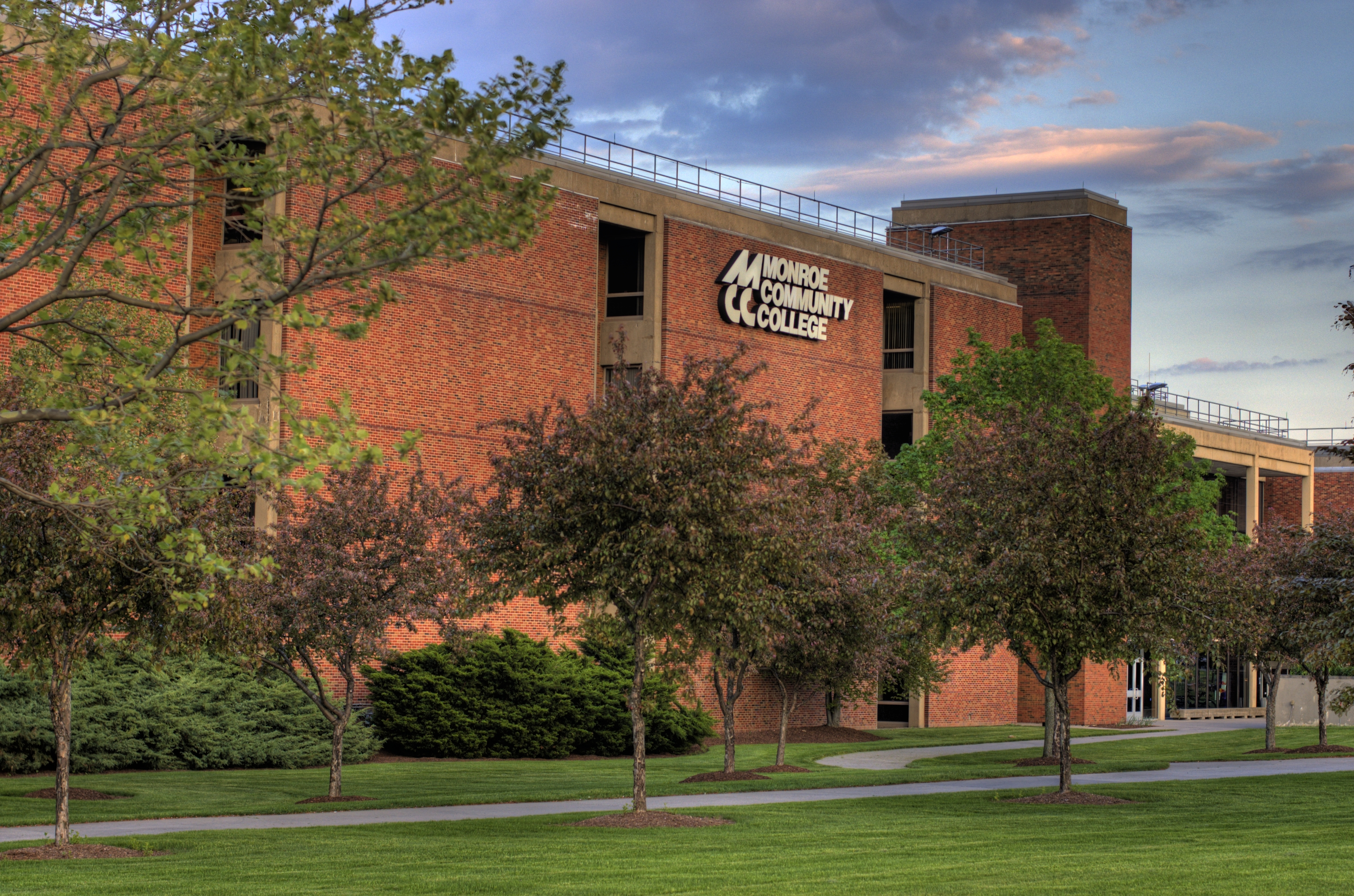
Monroe Community College in Rochester, New York

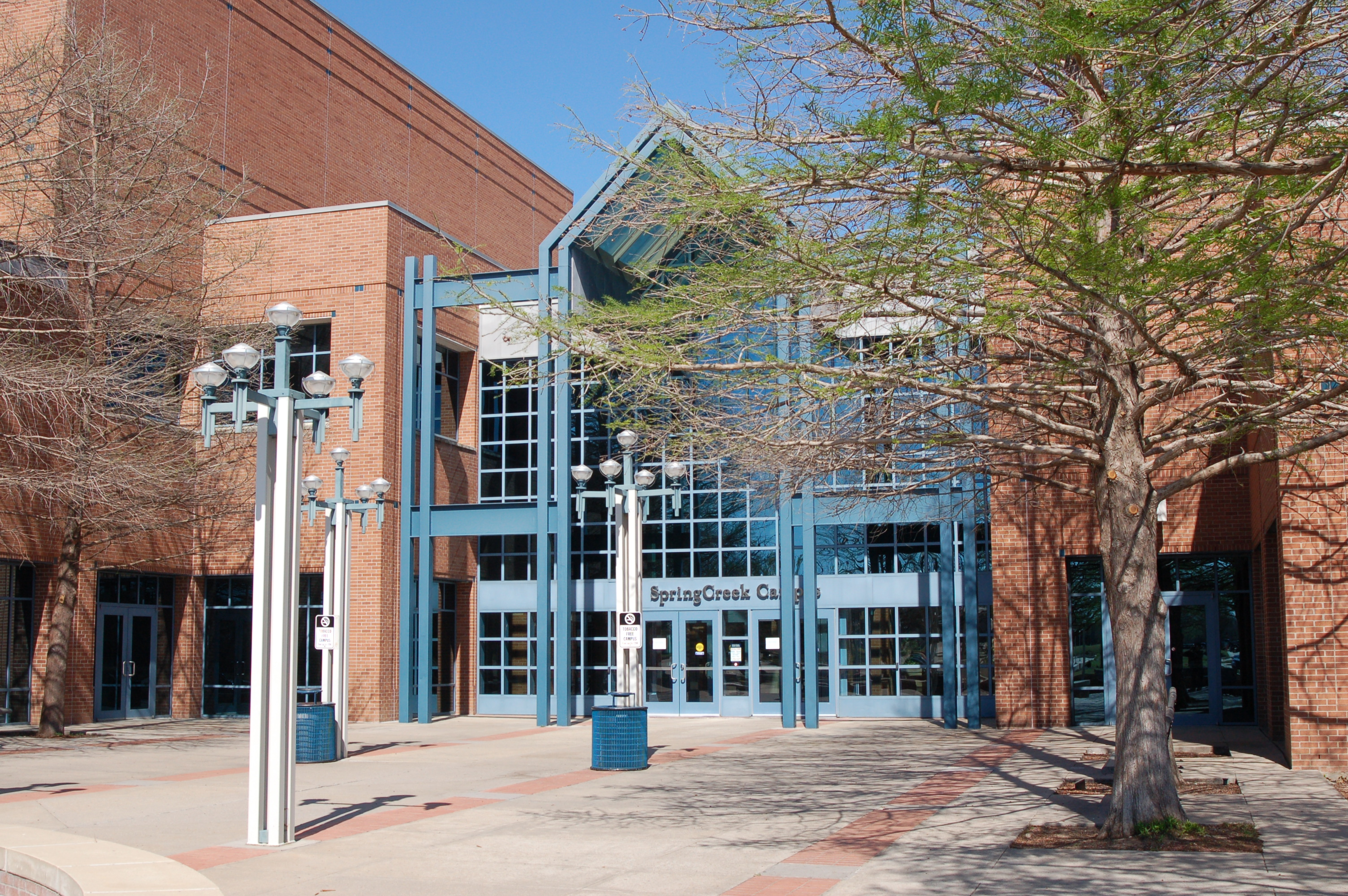
Collin College in Plano, Texas

In the United States, community colleges, sometimes called junior colleges, technical colleges, two-year colleges, or city colleges, are primarily public institutions providing tertiary education, also known as continuing education, that focuses on certificates, diplomas, and associate degrees. After graduating from a community college, some students transfer to a liberal arts college or university for two to three years to complete a bachelor's degree.

Before the 1970s, community colleges in the United States were more commonly referred to as junior colleges. That term is still used at some institutions. Public community colleges primarily attract and accept students from the local community and are usually supported by local tax revenue. They usually work with local and regional businesses to ensure students are being prepared for the local workforce.

== Research ==
Some research organizations and publications focus upon the activities of community college, junior college, and technical college institutions. Many of these institutions and organizations present the most current research and practical outcomes at annual community college conferences.

- The American Association of Community Colleges has provided oversight on community college research since the 1920s. AACC publishes a research journal called the Community College Journal.
- The Community College Research Center (CCRC) at Teachers College, Columbia University, has been conducting research on community colleges since 1996 to identify barriers to students' post-secondary access and promising solutions. CCRC's publishes research reports, briefs, and resources geared toward a variety of community college stakeholders, including college and college system leaders, faculty and support staff, policymakers, and institutional researchers.
- The Association of Community College Trustees (ACCT) has provided education for community college boards of directors and advocacy for community colleges since 1972. ACCT President and CEO J. Noah Brown published a book about the past, present, and future of community colleges, Charting a New Course for Community Colleges: Aligning Policies with Practice.
- The Center for Community College Student Engagement at the University of Texas at Austin administers surveys and provides data analysis support to member colleges regarding various factors of student engagement and involvement in community colleges in the United States and Canada.
- The Office of Community College Research and Leadership at the University of Illinois at Urbana–Champaign studies policies, programs, and practices designed to enhance outcomes for diverse youth and adults who seek to transition to and through college to employment. OCCRL's research spans the P-20 education continuum, with an intense focus on how community colleges impact education and employment outcomes for diverse learners. Results of OCCRL's studies of pathways and programs of study, extending from high school to community colleges and universities and to employment, are disseminated nationally and internationally. Reports and materials are derived from new knowledge captured and disseminated through OCCRL's website, scholarly publications, and other vehicles.

Several peer-reviewed journals extensively publish research on community colleges, including Community College Review and others.

== See also ==
- Articulation (education)
- Distance learning
- E-learning
- Folk high school
- Junior college
- Lifelong learning

In Australia

- Technical and further education
- Workers' Educational Association, also in the UK

In the Philippines

- Association of Local Colleges and Universities
- Local college and university

In the United Kingdom

- Further education
