= Radio Al-Hikmah FM =

Radio Al-Hikmah
- Ilorin; Nigeria
- Frequency: 106.7 MHz

Programming
- Format: Contemporary, Classical, News and Sport, Talk

Ownership
- Owner: University of Al-Hikmah (Online radio)

History
- First air date: October 2020

Radio Al-Hikmah is an online radio station which started established in October, 2020. It is being managed by the Mass Communication Department of the University of Al-Hikmah, Ilorin, Nigeria.

Radio Al-Hikmah frequency is 106.7 FM.

The radio station was established to enhance students capacity in the area of journalism and media related subjects.
