= J. Noah Brown =

American academic

J. Noah Brown is an American academic. He is a senior advisor for the Office of Career, Technical and Adult Education at the U.S. Department of Education and is the former president and chief executive officer of the Association of Community College Trustees. Brown has been featured by a number of major national press outlets, including Parade magazine's "Intelligence Report." In 2011, Brown was asked by the Rowman & Littlefield publishing company to author a book about the past, present, and future of community colleges. Brown's book, First in the World: Community Colleges and America's Future, was published in October 2012. The book was awarded the 2013 Bellwether Book Award by the Community College Futures Assembly in Orlando, Florida on January 29, 2013.

Brown served an ex officio member of the board of directors for the Council for Resource Development (CRD); and National Association for Community College Entrepreneurship (NACCE). He also served on the board of directors for the Association Mutual Health Insurance Company (AMHIC).

Brown served on the Washington Higher Education Secretariat and Committee for Education Funding. He is former appointed member on the Steering Committee for the United States - Denmark Partnership for Vocational Education, U.S. Department of Education. Brown also was appointed by former Secretary of State Condoleezza Rice to a three-year term (through 2010) as Commissioner on the U.S. National Commission for UNESCO, U.S. Department of State.

Brown holds a Bachelor of Arts in Philosophy from the University of Michigan, Ann Arbor, a Master of Public Policy degree from the University of Maryland, College Park, and an Honorary Associate of Arts from Atlantic Cape Community College in New Jersey. He is married and the father of two daughters.
