= Rowe-Lant Farm =

Historic house in New York, United States

- U.S. National Register of Historic Places
- Location within New York Location within the United States
- Location: 983 NY-295, East Chatham, New York
- Coordinates: 42°24′19.27″N 73°32′15.73″W
- Area: 127 acres (51 ha)
- Built: 1790
- NRHP reference No.: 10000099
- Added to NRHP: March 23, 2010

Rowe-Lant Farm is a historic home and farm complex located at East Chatham in Columbia County, New York. The farmhouse was built about 1790 and is an L-shaped dwelling with a 2-story, brick main block and 1 1/2-story brick and frame wing. It is five bays wide and two bays deep with a gable roof. Also on the property is a large timber-frame barn, garage and horse barn, and large tractor barn.

It was added to the National Register of Historic Places in 2010.
