= Bashir Abubakar =

Nigerian government official

- Barden Kudun Zazzau Nigerian Ombudsman

MFR

Chief Commissioner Public Complaint Commission

Personal details
- Born: 12 December 1962 Zaria, Kaduna State, Nigeria
- Party: All Progressives Congress

Military service
- Allegiance: Nigeria
- Branch/service: Nigeria Customs Service
- Years of service: 1987–2020

Bashir Abubakar MFR (born 12 December 1962) is a Nigerian politician who holds the title of Barden Kudun Zazzau. He is currently appointed as the Chief Commissioner Public Complaints Commission, Nigeria by the President Bola Ahmed Tinubu . He retired from the Nigeria Customs Service in 2020 and had risen to the management rank of Assistant Controller General Of Customs (ACG). His retirement opened up an opportunity for him to join politics where he contested for primary election for Kaduna State Governorship position under All Progressives Congress (APC), where he emerged as 1st runner-up.

== Background ==
Abubakar had his educational career in his home town where he completed his primary education in L.E.A. Anguwan Fatika, Zaria in 1975, Government Secondary School (GSS) Zaria in 1980, School of Basic Studies Samaru Zaria in 1981 and finally his first degree in the prestigious Ahmadu Bello University (ABU) Zaria in 1984. He reported to the National Youth Service Corps, (NYSC) Orientation Camp in The Polytechnic Ibadan for his mandatory national service in 1984 where he finally served in the then University of Ile-Ife, (Old Oyo State) now Obafemi Awolowo University, Ile-Ife, Osun State and completed in 1985. He also had a diploma program with Kaduna polytechnic in year 2005.

== Early career ==
Abubakar served the Nigerian Customs Service for 33 years. He headed some of the most sensitive offices and commands in the department, including Comptroller Headquarters under the office of the Comptroller General, Customs Area Controller, FCT Area Command Abuja; Comptroller Post Clearance Audit Zone ‘A’ Lagos; Customs Area Controller Area II Port-Harcourt Onne Port; Customs Area Controller Apapa Area Command; ACG Secretary to Nigeria Customs Service Board headquarters; Pioneer Coordinator Border Drill Operation code named “Operation Swift Response” Sector 4 (Northwest) Headquarters Katsina and lastly, the ACG Zonal Coordinator Zone 'B’ Headquarters Kaduna.

== Political career ==
Abubakar joined politics based on the pressure mounted by his people from various angles of Kaduna State in 2022. Barely less than one and a half month to the APC primary election, he joined the race and vied for the governorship position and became the first runner up. After the primary election, the then APC Governorship candidate of Kaduna State, Sen. Uba Sani and his team requested to team up with him for the success of the party and eventually the party became victorious not only by winning the governorship seat but by also securing the majority in the state assembly seats. He has contributed immensely to the success of the Presidential and Governorship tickets as a Member, APC Presidential Campaign Council 2023, (PCC); Senior Adviser on Strategy, Kaduna State APC Campaign Council, 2023; Member, APC Presidential Independent Campaign Council, (ICC); Member, Presidential Advisory Committee of Remi Tinubu, 2023 and chairman, Kaduna State Transition Sub-Committee on Security, Law and order.

== Community service ==
Abubakar has maintained his local community as his base, where he lives with his family. He is a detribalized Nigerian who advocates for peaceful coexistence and harmony amongst people. He arranges and participates in meetings with various youths groups, and teaches them how to form organizations that can keep up with national and international standards, with regards to community development, self-reliance and security. He works with students who have educational challenges—specifically with their national and regional examination results—by putting in place a number of refresher programs that enable them to retake such examinations. He has encouraged communities to buy lands and build schools for themselves, and also works with both local & federal organizations in making such projects a reality. He also educates communities on how to organize and provide basic social amenities to themselves through self-help efforts to complement the efforts of Government by construction of local wells, and manual and electronic boreholes in various parts of Zazzau communities. He has participated in the renovation and reconstruction of old and new health centers for the communities. He is an advocate of ‘’BACK TO BASE CAMPAIGN’’, where students and young graduates are encouraged to participate in their ancestral professions like farming, tanning and dyeing, black smithing, sawing, embroidery work, saddle making, poetry, and other local professions. He is a Board member of Zazzau Educational Development Association (ZEDA); Chairman of Iya Alu Memorial Schools; Zazzau Emirate committee of Zakka, Da’awa and Waqaf; Vice President of Alhudahuda College Zaria, and National President of ABU Old Boys Association. He was honored with the naming of a school after him by the Kaduna State Government. He is currently holding the traditional title of Barden Kudun Zazzau, a title given to him as an heir of the Zazzau throne by His Highness, Amb. (Dr.) Ahmed Nuhu Bamalli.

== Awards and recognitions ==
1. Controller General of Customs, Jacob Gyang Buba, merit Award on Best Revenue Recovery in (2004).
2. Controller General of Customs, Hameed Ibrahim Ali, letter of commendation on Dedication to duty, Onne port,port-Harcourt in (2018).
3. Comptroller General of Customs Hameed Ibrahim Ali commendation letter,Apapa port, Lagos in (2019).
4. Director-General National Agency for Food and Drug Administration and Control (NAFDAC) Merit Award for support and safeguarding public health in (2019).
5. World Customs Organization (WCO) Merit Award for rendering exceptional service to international Customs community in (2019).
6. ICPS/OSGF Integrity Award in 2019 by the President and commander in chief of the Nigeria Armed Forces, President Muhammad Buhari (GCFR).
7. In recognition of his outstanding service and contributions to the development of Nigeria, on the 19th of September, 2022, the President and commander in chief of the Nigeria Armed Forces, President Muhammad Buhari (GCFR) also and again conferred on him, the national honour of Member of the Order of the Federal Republic (MFR).
