= Muslim Students Society of Nigeria =

Islamic organization based in Nigeria

The Muslim Students' Society of Nigeria (MSSN) was launched officially at the Ansaruddeen Alakoro Mosque School Hall, Lagos on 30 May 1954.

Within a year of formation, its branches spread to cover more schools in Lagos, Abeokuta, Ibadan, Ilesha, IjebuOde, and Ikorodu. Two years later, the Society’s presence covered virtually all government schools in the north.

Its first conference was held in 1955, which was declared open by Oba Adeniji Adele II of Lagos, Brother Abdullateef Adegbite and Brother A.R.A Sahid were elected as the first National President and Secretary-General respectively of the society.

Adegbite, its first national president, became known for his defense of Sharia law.

Engr. Tajudeen Mustopha is the current and the 38th Amir of the Muslim students' society of Nigeria.

The Muslim Students' Society of Nigeria has two zones for easy coordination of its activities and programmes: the A-Zone and B-Zone. The A-Zone comprises all the Northern states, while the B-Zone comprises all the states from the South, South-West, South-South, and South-East part of Nigeria. Dr. Moshood Kolawole Asqolaani is the current Amir of the B-Zone.

Following the Chibok schoolgirl kidnapping, the president of the Muslim Students Society of Nigeria then, Mallam Abdulazeez Folayemi, called on Muslims to fast and pray "in order to seek Allah's intervention in this precarious time."

== Presidents ==
The historical presidents of Muslim Students Society of Nigeria are as follows.

- Razaq Deremi Abubakre (1974-1975)
