= Community College Review =

- Discipline: Education
- Language: English
- Edited by: Jaime Lester

Publication details
- History: 1973-present
- Publisher: Sage Publishing in association with North Carolina State University (United States)
- Frequency: Quarterly

Standard abbreviations
- ISO 4: Community Coll. Rev.

Indexing
- ISSN: 0091-5521 (print); 1940-2325 (web)
- LCCN: 73644969
- OCLC no.: 41156099

Links
- Journal homepage; Online access; Online archive

Community College Review is a quarterly peer-reviewed academic journal covering research and commentary on community colleges. The editor-in-chief is Jaime Lester (George Mason University). It was established in 1973 and is published by SAGE Publishing in association with North Carolina State University.

== Abstracting and indexing ==
The journal is abstracted and indexed in:

- Academic Complete
- Academic Premier
- EBSCO
- Educational Research Abstracts Online
- Emerging Sources Citation Index
- ERIC
- Higher Education Abstracts
- ProQuest
- Scopus
- Wilson Education Index
