= Noah Brown =

Noah Brown may refer to:

== People ==
- Noah Brown (shipwright), American shipbuilder
- Noah Brown (American football) (born 1996), American football player
- Noah Brown (rugby union) (born 2001), American rugby union player
- J. Noah Brown, American academic

== Other ==
- SS Noah Brown, United States Liberty Ship built in 1944
