= John K. Boies =

American politician (1828–1891)

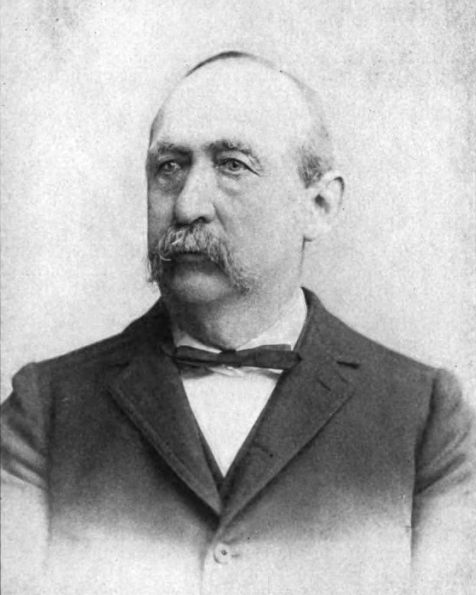

Member of the Michigan Senate from the 6th district
- In office January 1, 1875 – December 31, 1876
- Preceded by: Charles E. Mickley
- Succeeded by: Roland B. C. Newcomb

Member of the Michigan Senate from the 8th district
- In office January 1, 1869 – December 31, 1870
- Preceded by: Charles Croswell
- Succeeded by: James P. Cawley

Member of the Michigan House of Representatives from the Lenawee County 1st district
- In office January 1, 1865 – December 31, 1868
- Preceded by: Noah K. Green
- Succeeded by: Charles A. Jewell

Personal details
- Born: December 6, 1828 Blandford, Massachusetts, US
- Died: August 21, 1891 (aged 62) Washington, D.C., US
- Party: Republican

John Keep Boies (December 6, 1828 – August 21, 1891) was an American politician.

== Early life ==
John K. Boies was born on December 6, 1828, in Blandford, Massachusetts, to parents Lemuel and Experience Boies. John moved to Hudson, Michigan, in 1845.

== Career ==
Boies served as village president of Hudson Village for two terms. On November 8, 1864, Boies was elected to the Michigan House of Representatives where he represented the Lenawee County 1st district from January 4, 1865, to December 31, 1868. On November 3, 1868, Boies was elected to the Michigan Senate where he represented the 8th district from January 6, 1869, to December 31, 1870. On November 3, 1874, Boies was elected to the Michigan Senate where he represented the 6th district from January 6, 1875, to December 31, 1876. During his last term in the state senate, Boies served as president pro tempore of the chamber. In 1881, Boies was appointed to the Board of Indian Commissioners by U.S. President James A. Garfield. He served on this board until his resignation on January 15, 1886.

== Death ==
Boies died on August 21, 1891, in Washington, D.C.
