= Razaq Deremi Abubakre =

Nigerian academic

- Born: January 20, 1948 (age 78)
- Occupation: vice chancellor

Razaq Deremi Abubakre was born on January 20, 1948). He is former vice-chancellor of Al-Hikmah University, Ilorin, Kwara State, Nigeria and the first Yoruba professor of Arabic.

== Education ==
Abubakre did not have a secondary school education, but he studied on his own and gained admission to study Arabic and Economics at the University of Ibadan. He was awarded a Commonwealth Scholarship to pursue his doctoral studies in Arabic Literature at the School of Oriental and African Studies, the University of London, from 1977 to 1980.

== Career ==
Abubakre became a professor of Arabic at the University of Ilorin in 1989. Notable positions He has served include:

- ‌ Chairman, Governing Council of the Oyo State College of Education, now Osun State College of Education, Ila Orangun, between 1986 and 1989.
- He then became the Chairman of the Governing Council, Muftau Lanihun College of Education, Ibadan, 2002–2006.
- ‌ Head of the Department of Religions, University of Ilorin 1992–1995
- ‌ Dean of the Faculty of Arts, University of Ilorin from 2001 to 2003
- ‌ President of the Nigerian Association for the Study of Religions (NASR) from 1988 to 1994
- ‌Vice Chancellor, Al-Hikmah University, Ilorin (2008–2010)
- ‌ Federal Commissioner for the Public Complaints Commission in charge of Osun State (2012–2018).
- Chairman Contact Committee of the National Board of Arabic and Islamic Studies (NBAIS), Kaduna (2007 to present).

== Books ==
- The Piety of Learning: Islamic Studies in Honor of Stefan Reichmuth
- The Interplay of Arabic and Yoruba Cultures in South-Western Nigeria
- Linguistic and Non-linguistic Aspects of Qurʼān Translating to Yoruba
