= Nigeria French Language Village =

Nigerian institution for French studies

The Nigeria French Language Village (French: Village français du Nigéria, also known as French Village) is an inter-university centre for French studies in Nigeria. Located in Badagry, Lagos State, the centre is an autonomous federal tertiary institution regulated by the Nigerian National Universities Commission.

== History ==
Established in 1991, the centre provides language immersion and acculturation programmes for students of French studies across Nigerian tertiary institutions, including universities, polytechnics and colleges of education. The centre was established as a domestic alternative to the erstwhile mandatory foreign-based year-abroad component of bachelor's degree programmes in Nigerian universities. The centre also offers language instruction services and certification programmes to private individuals interested in mastering the French language.

The Village is sited on a 16-hectare complex along the Lagos–Badagry Expressway, on the site of the former Government Teachers’ Training College in Badagry town.

The idea of the Nigeria French Language Village was conceived by former Nigerian Minister of Education, Jubril Aminu. It was, however, his successor, Babs Fafunwa who oversaw the take-off of the Village in September 1991. The first set of undergraduates from only six Nigerian Universities resumed in the Village on Monday 6 January 1992.

After 30 years of its existence, the Nigerian Senate passed the Nigeria French Language Village (Establishment) Bill, 2021 into law in July 2021, codifying the establishment of the institute as an inter-university centre for French studies in Nigeria. The passage of the bill followed the presentation and consideration of a report by the Senate Committee on Tertiary Institutions and TETFUND.

== Administration ==
The incumbent Director and chief executive officer of the institution is Lateef Babatunde Ayeleru, a Nigerian professor of French, Applied Linguistics and African Literature at the University of Ibadan. Ayeleru assumed the position in January 2020 taking over from Rauf Adebisi who served from July 2014 until 2020. The pioneer Director of the centre was Samuel Ade-Ojo, who served in the position for 12 years from 1991 till 2003. Samuel Olabanji Aje, the current Vice Chancellor of Achievers University, also headed the Village between 2003 and 2014.
