= East Chatham, New York =

- hamlet
- Location within the state of New York
- Coordinates: 42°24′38″N 73°31′28″W
- Country: United States
- State: New York
- County: Columbia
- Towns: Chatham, Canaan
- Established: c. 1759
- Elevation: 702 ft (214 m)
- Time zone: UTC-5 (Eastern (EST))
  - Summer (DST): UTC-4 (EDT)
- ZIP code: 12060
- Area code: 518

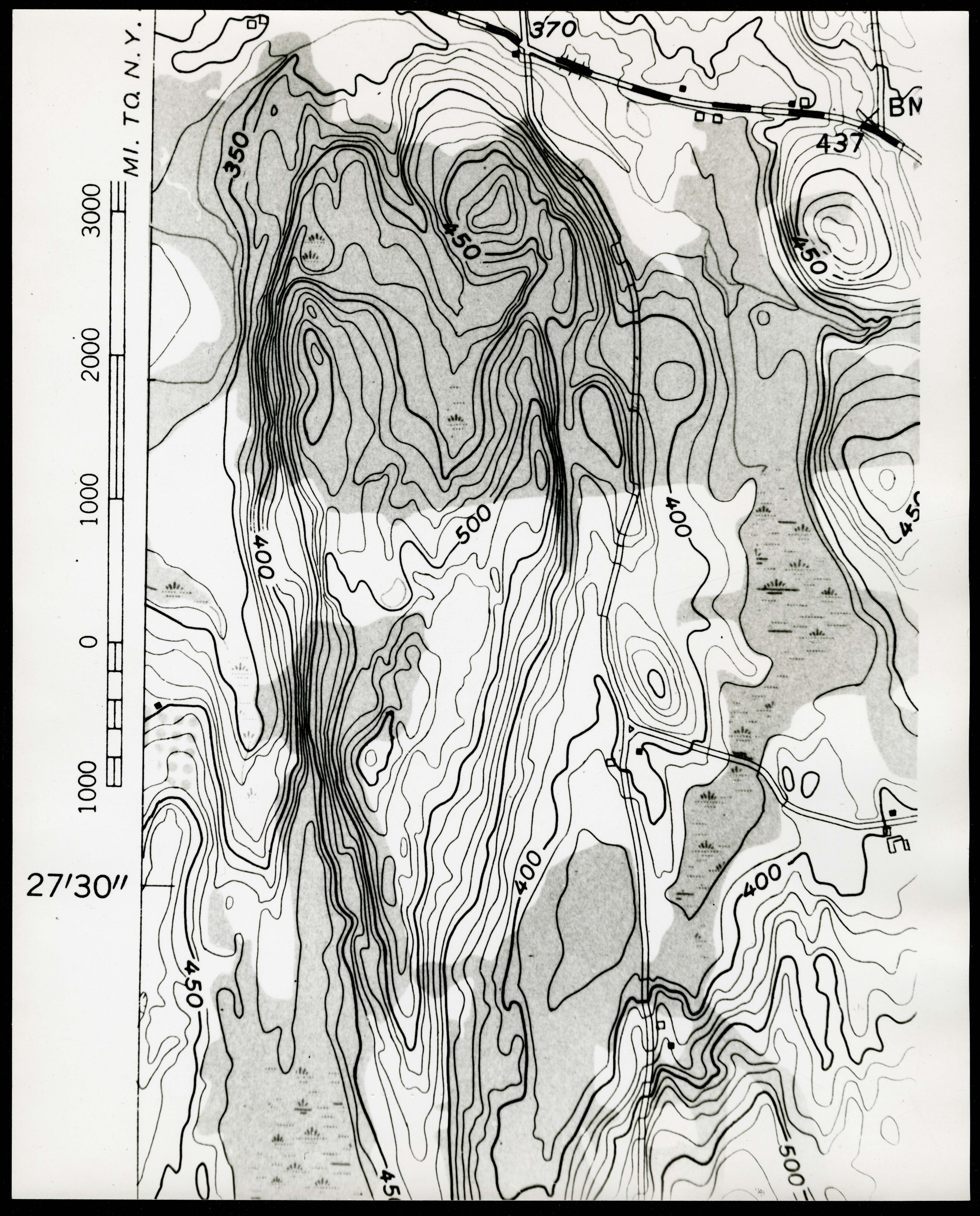
contour map of Griswold farm area, East Chatham 7 1-2 quadrangle, Columbia Co., New York

East Chatham is a hamlet located partly in the town of Chatham and partly in the town of Canaan, in the state of New York, United States. It is located at the crossroads of a railroad, Interstate 90, and the Taconic State Parkway.

East Chatham is the site of Vovcha Tropa, a campsite owned by Plast, the Ukrainian Scouting Organization. This camp is attended by several hundred scouts.

The Rowe-Lant Farm was added to the National Register of Historic Places in 2010.

== Notable person ==
Painter Emma Jane Cady was born in East Chatham.
