= Theorem stencil =

Type of art

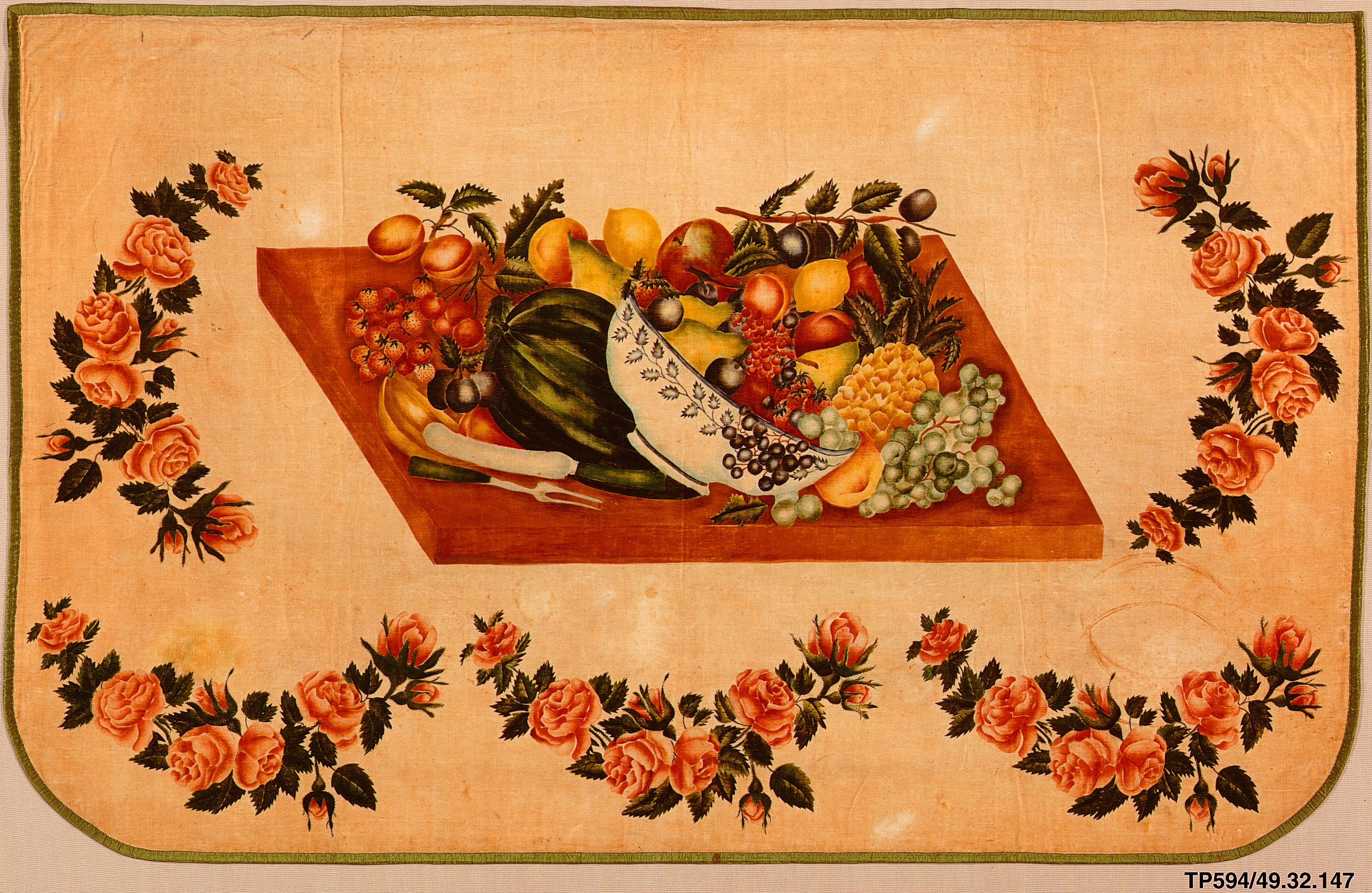
Example of a theorem painting (c.1850) from the Metropolitan Museum of Art

Theorem stencil, sometimes also called theorem painting or velvet painting, is the art of making stencils and using them to make drawings or paintings on fabric or paper.

A vogue for theorem stencil painting began in England at the turn of the 18th century and through the mid-1800s. The art was first taught to women in academies and boarding schools throughout colonial New England. It continued to be taught into the mid-1800s in many other areas.

The designs are traditionally painted on velvet and the work is then framed or matted. The stencils are multiple overlays and designs are always three-dimensional, primitive and stylized in nature. The resulting design is bridgeless—there are no gaps in between the overlays. Subjects often included foods, scenes, and symbols that were popular in the artist's area.

It was often referred to colloquially (especially in England) as "Poonah painting", because of its supposed origin in the Indian city of Pune.

Few theorem artists signed their work; one of the few to have done so was Emma Jane Cady.
