= Noah Graham =

American politician

Noah Graham (1815 - May 1885) was an A.M.E. minister and state legislator in Florida. The Florida Archives have a copy of his 1867 voter registration. He is identified as "Colored". He represented Leon County, Florida in the Florida House of Representatives from 1868 to 1872. In 1868 he was also a Leon County Commissioner when Lieutenant Governor William Henry Gleason assumed the governor's office made various appointments and a dispute ensued. Graham resigned as commissioner when order was restored. A leader in the Republican Party, he tried to mediate an 1870 state senate election campaign dispute between Republican Party rivals James Page's Baptist and conservative supporters and Charles H. Pearce's A.M.E. and Radical Republican faction. Pearce prevailed.

Noah Graham was born in Washington County, Georgia.

== See also ==
- African American officeholders from the end of the Civil War until before 1900
