= Noah Smith =

Noah Smith may refer to:

- Noah Smith (judge) (1756–1812), judge from Vermont during the early history of the United States
- Noah Smith (soccer) (born 2000), Australian soccer player
- Noah Smith (Home and Away), a character from the Australian television series Home and Away
- Yeat (born 2000), American rapper Noah Olivier Smith

== See also ==
- Taran Noah Smith (born 1984), American former actor
