= Public Complaints Commission, Nigeria =

Nigerian Federal Government agency

Public Complaint Commission
Agency overview
- Formed: 1975; 51 years ago
- Jurisdiction: Federal Republic of Nigeria
- Headquarters: Abuja
- Agency executive: Hon. Bashir Abubakar, Chief Commissioner
- Parent department: National Assembly
- Website: https://pcc.gov.ng

The Public Complaints Commission (abbreviated PCC) is an agency of the Federal government of Nigeria under the Presidency which acts as an Ombudsman that receives complaints of the citizenry against the government or private institutions/organization or their officials and wades in to settle issues. It was set up in 1975 to ensure accountability and transparency in the way government and its agencies as well as organizations engage with the public and to curb arbitrary use of administrative powers by public officials within and outside government establishments. Bashir Abubakar is the Chief Commissioner of the commission.

== History ==
The commission was set up through the Public Commission Act, 1975 No 31 and is empowered to widely receive and inquire into complaints by the public as pertains to work-related actions/decisions by government agencies, their officials and private organizations or their officials, and other related matters ancillary to that. However matters that are pending before and/or relating to, the National Assembly, the National Councils of State and Ministers, the Armed Forces, and the Police Force under the Army, Navy, Air Force and Police Acts are exempted. The Act was promulgated by the military administration of General Murtala Mohammed as was advised by the Jerome Udoji panel. The panel gave the advice to ensure that a body exists to check and control the brazen flouting of administrative procedures, government regulation and extant rules. The Public Complaints Commission Act was adopted into 1999(amended) Nigerian constitution which states in Section 315(5) that "Nothing in this Constitution shall invalidate the enactment of Public Complaints Commission Act, and the provisions of the Act". This statutory provision indicates that the Commission bears the responsibility of bridling and correcting all forms of abuse of power which can derail bureaucratic due process and the quality of services offered by government agencies and private organizations.

The PCC has offices in all the 36 States of Nigeria with the headquarters located at No. 25 Aguiyi Ironsi St, Council 900271, Abuja, FCT.

== Activities ==
The Public Complaints Commission upholds human rights. It also serves as a watchdog and peoples' court where everyone can get social and administrative justice without being charged any fees. This reduces tension, discontent and even crime among the citizenry which may arise if people do not know where to air the grievances they have with corporate bodies, government actions and officials. Communal crisis could also be curbed when complaints are made to the Commission at the stage of agitations. However, inadequate funds hinder the commission from creating awareness about their function and the establishment of offices at every Local government headquarters as well as resolving all the complaints brought to them. Between 2015 and 2018, the commission received 209,745 cases, resolved 87,461, while 122,284 cases are still pending.
