= Noah Yusuf =

Nigerian academic

- Born: Noah; 26 June 1964 (age 62); Lagos State, Nigeria, British Nigeria
- Occupations: • Nigerian academic • Professor • Conflict Management Studies

Professor Noah Yusuf Noah Yusuf.ogg is a Nigerian academic and professor of industrial sociology and conflict management studies. He served as the fifth vice-Chancellor of AL-Hikmah University in Ilorin, Kwara State, from July 2020 to July 2025.

== Early life and education ==
Yusuf was born on 26 June 1964, in Lagos, southwestern Region, British Nigeria in Lagos State, Nigeria. He attended Community L.E.A Primary School, in Okeya-Ipo and Omupo Grammar School. He completed his Higher School Certificate (HSC) at the School of Basic Studies at the former Kwara State College of Technology (now Kwara State Polytechnic) in Ilorin. He obtained his B.Sc. in Sociology from the University of Ibadan in 1986, and later completed his M.Sc. in 1990 and Ph.D. in 2003 at the same university. His doctoral thesis was based on a study of worker participation in management decision-making in Nigerian workplaces.

== Career ==
Yusuf kicked off his academic career at the University of Ilorin in 1992, and became a professor of Industrial Sociology in 2012. His inaugural lecture in 2014 was titled "Work, Culture and Society: The synergy that reflects our everyday existence". He served as Director of the Centre for Peace and Strategic Studies (CPSS) at the University of Ilorin from 2017 until his appointment as Vice-Chancellor, where he is noted for improving the center's standing. As the fifth Vice-Chancellor of Al-Hikmah University from 2020 to 2025, Yusuf oversaw the establishment of a medical school and implemented digitalization.

== Research and publication ==
His research interests include Industrial Sociology, Industrial Relations, and Peace and Conflict Management. As of July 2020, he had published extensively and held editorial roles for various journals, including Lapai Sociology Review and The Journal of Peace, Security and Development.

== Awards and Honors ==
He was made a fellow of the society of peace and practice in 2018. He was presented with the award of "An Icon peace and service to Humanity" by a teacher who worked under him in Lagos State. Federal Road Safety Corps (FRSC), Honorary Membership in 2023 presented him with an award for his contributions to road safety and education, which included establishing a special road marshal unit at AI-Hikmah University.
