= Noah Raford =

American futurist

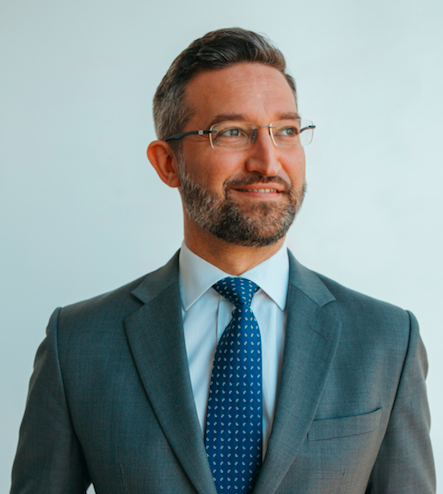
- Raford in 2020
- Born: May 3, 1978 (age 47); Charlottesville, Virginia
- Education: Brown University (BA); University College London (MA); MIT (PhD)
- Website: noahraford.com

Noah Raford (born 3 May 1978 in Charlottesville, Virginia) is an American futurist who specializes in public policy, strategy, and emerging technologies. He is a founding executive of the Dubai Future Foundation and the Museum of the Future, currently serving as Futurist-in-Chief and Chief of Global Affairs at the Dubai Future Foundation.

== Early life and education ==
Radford was born in Charlottesville, Virginia. He earned a Bachelor's in Socio-spatial Analysis and Design at Brown University in 2000 and completed his master's in advanced architectural analysis from the Bartlett School of Architecture at University College London (UCL) in 2004. He completed his PhD in Urban and Regional Planning at the Massachusetts Institute of Technology (MIT) in 2011.

== Career ==
From 2004 to 2009, Radford worked as the North American Director of Space Syntax Limited, the UK architectural and urban planning think tank. He served as Senior Research Advisor to the Prince’s Foundation for the Built Environment from 2008 to 2010 and was a senior strategy consultant at Monitor/Global Business Network in 2010.

Radford served as a member World Economic Forum (WEF) Global Agenda Council on Artificial Intelligence and Robotics. He is the former CEO and co-founder of Futurescaper, a cloud-based foresight company founded in 2011.

Radford has served as an advisor in the UAE Prime Minister’s Office. In 2016, he became a founding executive of the Dubai Future Foundation, and Acting Executive Director of the Museum of the Future, responsible for initiatives such as the Dubai Future Accelerators, UAE Drones for Good, and Courts of the Future Forum.

== Talks and panels ==
- “UAE Past, Present, Future”, Global Art Forum, 2018.
- “Artificial Intelligence: Our super-intelligent friend?”, Abu Dhabi Ideas Weekend, 2018.
- World Block Chain Forum, 2018.
- “First the Desert, Then the Stars”, NASA Jet Propulsion Laboratory, 2018.
- “Transformative Policy Design”, World Trade Center, Denver, Colorado, 2017.
- Moscow International Open Innovations Forum, 2017.
- “Four Postcards from the Future”, Global Art Forum, 2016.
- TedxDanubia, 2015.
- "Dubai, the most sustainable city", Flux Symposium, 2015.
- “The Future of Cities: Three Scenarios for Future Urbanism” Harvard University, 2010.

== Bibliography ==
- Raford N, Trabulsi, A, Warlords, Inc.: Black Markets, Broken States, and the Rise of the Warlord Entrepreneur, North Atlantic Books, 2015.
- Raford N, Gupta, N, Lupton, C, The Future We Deserve, PediaPress GmbH, 2012.
- Raford N, “Online foresight platforms: Evidence for their impact on scenario planning & strategic foresight”, Technological Forecasting and Social Change, Special Issue on Foresight Support Systems, Volume 97, August, 2015.
- Raford N, Crowdsourced Collective Intelligence Platforms for Participatory Scenarios and Foresight”, Journal of Futures Studies, Vo. 17 (1), 2012.
- Raford N, “From Design Fiction to Experiential Futures”, The Future of Futures, Ed. Curry A, Association of Professional Futurists, London, England.
- Raford N and Hillier B, “Measurement and description in socio-spatial analysis”, The Sage Handbook of Measurement, Oxford University Press, 2010.
- Geyer J, Raford N, Pham T, “The Continuing Debate about Safety in Numbers—Data from Oakland, CA”, Proceedings of the 85th Annual Meeting, Transportation Research Board, Washington, D.C., January, 2006.
- Raford N, Ragland R, “Space Syntax: An Innovative Pedestrian Volume Modeling Tool for Pedestrian Safety”, Proceedings of the 83rd Annual Meeting, Transportation Research Board, Washington, D.C., January, 2004.
