= Al-Hikmah University =

Private University in Kwara State, Nigeria

Coordinates: 8.485446°N 4.506111°E

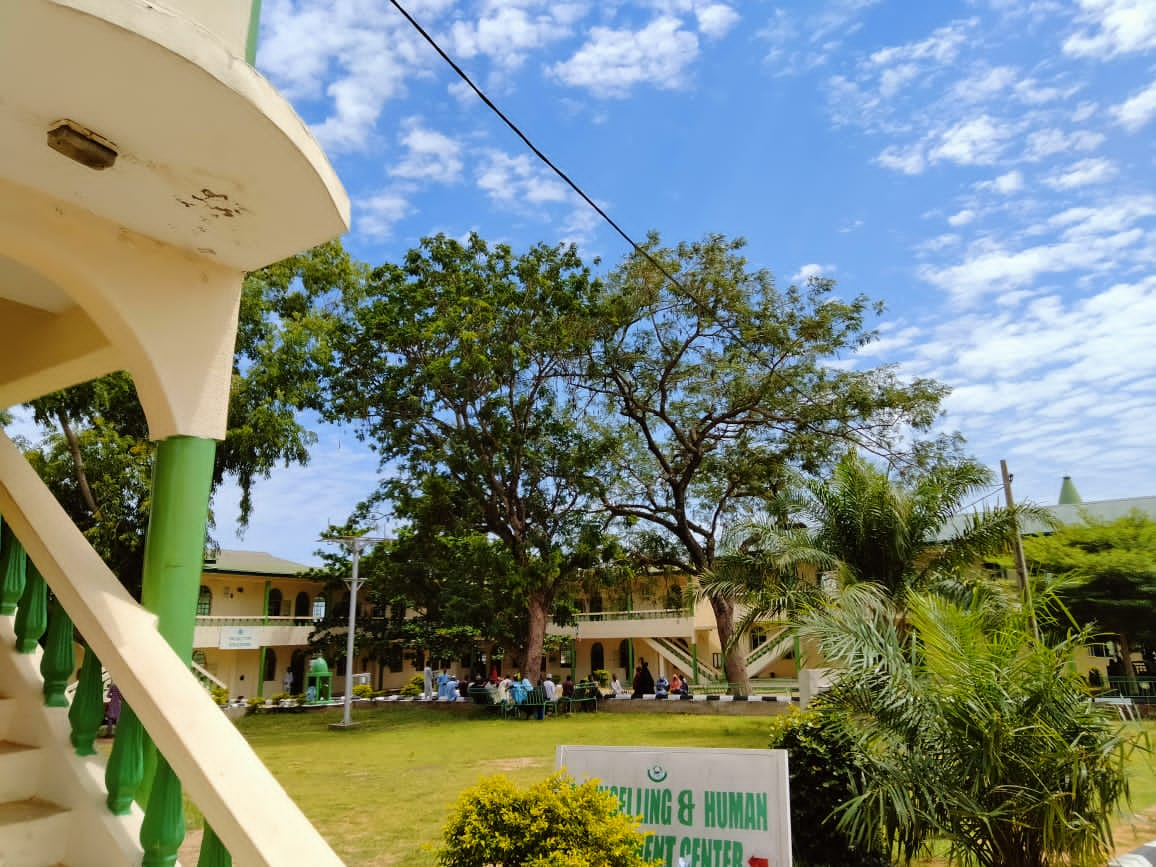
- Type: Private Islamic University
- Established: 2005
- Founder: AbdulRaheem Oladimeji Islamic Foundation (AROIF)
- Religious affiliation: Islam
- Vice-Chancellor: Noah Yusuf
- Location: Ilorin

Al-Hikmah University is an Islamic university located in Ilorin, Kwara State, Nigeria. It was founded in 2005 by AbdulRaheem Oladimeji Islamic Foundation (AROIF) based in Nigeria and World Assembly of Muslim Youths (WAMY) based in Jeddah. Muhammed Taofeek Olalekan Ibrahim is the immediate past Vice-chancellor. He was succeeded by Noah Yusuf who is now the current Vice-chancellor. The goal of Al-Hikmah University is to be a center of intellectual and moral excellence.

The University came into existence via the granting of an operating license to run as a Conventional Private University by the Federal Government of Nigeria License No. 010 on 7 January 2005. It commenced academic activities during the 2005–2006 academic session with 70 students spread across the three take-off colleges: Humanities, Management Sciences and Natural Sciences.

== Vice chancellors ==
The University has had these heads through the years:

- Professor Musbau Adewumi Akanji
- Professor Abdullahi Ahmad
- Prof. Sulyman Age Abdulkareem
- Professor Muhammed Taofeek Olalekan Ibrahim.
- Professor Noah Yusuf
- Professor Razaq Deremi Abubakre

== Faculties and Programmes ==
The University has several Faculties which are spread across two campuses (Ilorin and Igbaja) in Kwara State.

=== Agriculture ===
- B. Agriculture

=== Health Sciences ===
- B.Sc. Public Health
- B. Nursing Science
- B.Sc. Physiology
- B. Medical Laboratory Science (BMLS)
- B.Sc. Human Anatomy.

=== Law ===
- LL.B. Common Law
- LL.B. Common and Islamic Law

=== Natural and Applied Sciences ===
- B.Sc. Computer Science
- B.Sc. Software Engineering
- B.Sc. Cyber Security
- B.Sc. Information System
- B.Sc. Geology
- B.Sc. Petroleum Chemistry
- B.Sc. Biology
- B.Sc. Industrial Chemistry
- B.Sc. Biochemistry
- B.Sc. Microbiology
- B.Sc. Industrial Mathematics
- B.Sc. Physics with Electronics
- B.Sc. Physics
- B.Sc. Statistics

=== Humanities and Social Sciences ===
- B.Sc. Sociology
- B.Sc. Public Administration
- B.Sc. Mass Communication
- B.Sc. Political Science & Conflict Resolution
- B.Sc. Islamic Studies
- B.Sc. History and International Relation
- B.Sc. Arabic
- B.Sc. English

=== Management Sciences ===
- B.Sc. Accounting
- B.Sc. Economics
- B.Sc. Business Administration
- B.Sc. Marketing
- B.Sc. Banking & Finance

=== Educations ===
- B.Sc. (Ed.) Computer Science
- B.Sc. (Ed.) Chemistry
- B.Sc. (Ed.) Mathematics
- B.Sc. (Ed.) Biology
- B.Sc. (Ed.) Physics
- B.Sc. (Ed.) Education Technology
- B.Sc. (Ed.) Guidance and Counseling
- B.Sc. (Ed.) Educational Management
- B. Library and Information Science (BLIS)
- B.A. (Ed.) Islamic Studies
- B.A. (Ed.) Arabic
- B.A. (Ed.) Social Studies
- B.A. (Ed.) English
- B.Sc. (Ed.) Political Science
- B.Sc. (Ed.) Business Education
- B.Sc. (Ed.) Economics

=== Sub-Degree Diploma Programmes ===
- Diploma in Common Law
- Diploma in Common and Islamic Law
- Diploma in Arabic and Islamic Studies
- Diploma in International Relations
- Diploma in Accounting
- Diploma in Business Administration
- Diploma in Computer Science.

=== Medical School Of Natural Medicine ===
In 2023, the school announced the opening of its medical school of Natural medicine and Natural herbs.

== Collaborations/initiative ==
Al-Hikmah University has collaborated with National Drug Law Enforcement Agency (NDLEA) to counter act drug abuse especially amongst youth. Also with the Economic and Financial crime commission Agency.

=== Green campus initiative ===
In August 2023, the University begins a green campus, in the school, the initiate deals with planting of tree and environmental climate change.

== Convocation ==
On the 9th of December, the University hold is 13th convocation ceremony in which 1584 students are graduated from the school.

== Scholarship ==
On the 13th convocation ceremony of the school the speaker of the event announces sponsorship for female indigent students at the school.
