= Noah Lewis =

Noah Lewis may refer to:

- Noah Lewis (musician), (1891–1961) American musician
- Noah Lewis (footballer), (born 2000) Dutch footballer
