= Deledda International School =

School in Italy

Deledda International School is a semi-private English-speaking school in Genoa, Italy. Despite being an independent school, the school is helped by the government of the Comune di Genova. It is not affiliated with the public school "Liceo Linguistico Deledda" even if they are under the management of the same foundation. It was established in 1999 and became a world school. The school currently offers both the International Baccalaureate's Diploma Programme (grades 11 and 12) and the Middle Years Programme (grades 6 through 10). In 2016, it opened a primary school (grades 1 to 5) where classes are taught mostly in Italian, with extra hours of English.
