= Noah Böhringer =

German politician (born 1997)

Member of the Landtag of Mecklenburg-Vorpommern
- Incumbent
- Assumed office 11 March 2026
- Preceded by: René Domke

Personal details
- Born: 1997 (age 28–29)
- Party: Free Democratic Party

Noah Böhringer (born 1997) is a German politician serving as a member of the Landtag of Mecklenburg-Vorpommern since 2026. He is a deputy chairman of the Young Liberals in Mecklenburg-Vorpommern.
