= Kalleem Noah =

Kalleem Bacile Noah
- Born: October 4, 1868; Hadath, Ottoman Empire
- Died: November 25, 1952 (aged 84); St. John's, Newfoundland and Labrador
- Occupations: Businessperson in dry goods and real estate

Kalleem Bacile Noah (October 4, 1868 – November 25, 1952) was a businessman best known as founder and proprietor of Kalleem Noah Ltd., a dry goods firm in St. John's, Newfoundland and Labrador. Noah was active in St. John's from approximately 1896 until his death. Prior to his arrival in Newfoundland, he did business in New York City and Nova Scotia.

== Biography ==
Noah was born Kalleem Noah Bacile (sometimes spelled Kaleem) on October 4, 1868, in Hadath, Ottoman Empire, to parents Bacele and Sphire (Winnifred) Noah. He emigrated to the United States in 1887 before settling in Yarmouth, Nova Scotia where he was a dealer of dry goods. In May 1891, he married Cecelia Craitem (alternatively Koritem) with whom he had seven children. He arrived in Newfoundland by 1896 where he established a business selling dry goods, clothing, and other items under the name Kalleem Noah Ltd. In 1907 he purchased the property known as Weston Cottage on Water Street West.

Noah was Roman Catholic and a member of the Knights of Columbus. He was father-in-law to manufacturer, businessman, and former Canadian Senator Michael Basha.

== Premises ==
Noah established his business in a building on the corner of Water Street and Buchanan Street which he took ownership of in 1898. The structure later came to house several other businesses operated by members of the local Lebanese community but was demolished in 2019. He later moved his enterprise east on Water Street to numbers 320–322 which he first rented from the Bairds. Noah soon purchased the building and in 1920 demolished it to erect a "splendid concrete structure" known as the Noah Building. Noah came to build and own other downtown properties including a concrete structure on the corner of Springdale Street and New Gower Street which burned in 1948.

== See also ==
Downtown St. John's
