= Noah Rubin =

Noah Rubin may refer to:

- Noah Rubin (music executive)
- Noah Rubin (tennis)
