= Noah K. Green =

American politician

Member of the Michigan House of Representatives from the Lenawee County 1st district
- In office January 1, 1863 – December 31, 1864
- Preceded by: Daniel D. Piper
- Succeeded by: John K. Boies

Member of the Michigan House of Representatives from the Lenawee County 4th district
- In office January 1, 1861 – December 31, 1862
- Preceded by: Orson Green
- Succeeded by: Hiram Raymond

Member of the Michigan House of Representatives from the Lenawee County district
- In office January 7, 1850 – April 21, 1850

Personal details
- Born: December 24, 1808 Windsor, Massachusetts, US
- Died: May 8, 1886 (aged 77) Medina Township, Michigan, US
- Party: Republican
- Spouse: Esther Eliza Baldwin

Noah Knight Green (December 24, 1808 – May 8, 1886) was a Michigan politician.

== Early life ==
Noah K. Green was born on December 24, 1808, in Windsor, Massachusetts to parents Noah and Sarah Green. In Massachusetts, Noah K. Green received an education and was brought up as a farmer.

== Career ==
Green settled on a farm in Medina Township, Michigan in 1835. On November 5, 1849, Green was elected to the Michigan House of Representatives where he represented the Lenawee County district from January 7, 1850, to April 21, 1850. On November 6, 1860, Green was elected to the Michigan House of Representatives where he represented the Lenawee County 4th district from January 2, 1861, to December 31, 1862. On November 4, 1862, Green was elected to the Michigan House of Representatives where he represented the Lenawee County 1st district from January 7, 1863, to December 31, 1864.

== Personal life ==
Green married Esther Eliza Baldwin on November 5, 1834, in Windsor, Massachusetts. They had at least four children.

== Death ==
Green died on May 8, 1886, in Medina Township.
