= Noah North =

American painter (1809–1880)

Noah North (27 June 1809, Alexander, New York – 15 June 1880, Attica, New York) was an itinerant American portrait painter in the folk art tradition.

== Life and work ==
He was born to a prominent family that was active in civic affairs, as he would be throughout much of his life. His interest in painting was apparently the result of a friendship with Van Rensselaer Hawkins (1797–1847), an itinerant painter and art teacher who came to live in Alexander.

His career as an artist was very brief; almost entirely confined to the 1830s. In addition to Alexander, he also worked in Rochester, Cleveland and Cincinnati (1836/37) and possibly northern Kentucky.

His portraits resemble those of Ammi Phillips, another New York painter, originally from Connecticut. Milton W. Hopkins may have also been an influence as he apparently lived in close proximity to North. In fact, census records indicate that North may have boarded with Hopkins.

His style is very simple and also reminiscent of the early New England limners. Many of his works feature people holding pets. His first dated portrait is from 1833, although it is identified as "number 11", which naturally suggest that ten paintings have been lost. No signed portraits are known from after 1840.

In 1841, he returned to New York, got married, and settled in Livingston County. From 1845 to 1847, he operated a daguerreotype studio in Mount Morris. He also did occasional work as an ornamental painter, although farming appears to have been his primary activity until his death.
