= Noah Newby =

19th century American farmer and politician

Noah R. Newby was a teacher and state legislator in North Carolina. He was African American.

He taught in various areas and reported acquiring land as well as a horse and buggy.

He had a farm in Pasquotank County and taught in Elizabeth City. He served in the legislature in 1883 and opposed legislation limiting funding for schools serving African Americans.
