= Noah Fierer =

American microbial ecologist

- Born: Pennsylvania, US

Academic background
- Education: BA, 1995, Oberlin College; PhD, 2003, University of California, Santa Barbara
- Thesis: Stress ecology and the dynamics of microbial communities and processes in soil (2003)

Academic work
- Institutions: University of Colorado Boulder; Cooperative Institute for Research in Environmental Sciences
- Website: fiererlab.org

Noah Fierer is an American microbial ecologist. He is a Full Professor in the Department of Ecology and Evolutionary Biology at the University of Colorado Boulder.

== Early life and education ==
Fierer was raised in Pennsylvania, US. He completed his Bachelor of Arts degree at Oberlin College in 1995 and his PhD from the University of California, Santa Barbara in 2003.

== Career ==
Following his PhD, Fierer conducted his post-doctoral at Duke University before joining the faculty at the University of Colorado Boulder. In 2006, he collaborated with biologist Robert Jackson and published a study showing acidic soils of topical forests contained fewer bacterial species than the neutral soils of deserts. As an assistant professor, he also led a study indicating women had a significantly greater diversity of microbes on their palms than men. In 2010, Fierer helped develop a tool to identify individuals DNA using the bacterial communities living on their fingers and palms left behind on objects. As a result of his research, Fierer also received a National Science Foundation CAREER Award to study the effects of nutrient addition on soil microbial communities.

As a fellow at the Cooperative Institute for Research in Environmental Sciences (CIRES) in 2014, Fierer co-authored a paper displaying the sequenced internal bacterial makeup of the three major life stages of a butterfly species. Following this, he also collaborated with researchers from North Carolina State University to produce the first atlas of airborne microbes across the continental United States. By 2017, he had co-authored three academic papers in addition to laboratory sequencing and authoring, to show that molecular approaches can be used to understand the makeup and sheer abundance of organisms. As a result, he was the recipient of the 2017 Provost Faculty Achievement Award.

In 2018, Fierer partook in compiling the first global atlas of soil bacterial communities and identifying a group of around 500 key species worldwide. In both 2018 and 2019, Fierer was recognized as a highly cited scholar by the Web of Science Group at Clarivate Analytics.

== Personal life ==
Fierer is married and has one daughter. In his free time, he enjoys hiking, biking, trail running, and skiing.
