= Association of Community College Trustees =

Non-profit educational organization

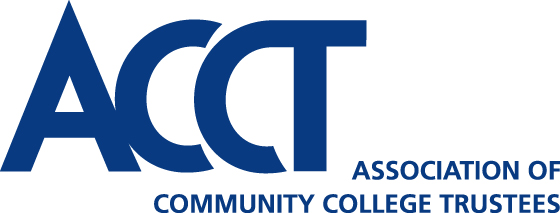
- Abbreviation: ACCT
- Founded: 1969
- Purpose: Professional association
- Headquarters: Washington, DC
- Members: 6,500 Community college trustees
- President and CEO: J. Noah Brown
- Board of Trustees Chair: David Mathis, Mohawk Valley Community College
- Budget: $6.5 million (2019)
- Website: https://www.ACCT.org

The Association of Community College Trustees (ACCT) is a non-profit educational organization representing more than 6,500 elected and appointed trustees who govern more than 1,200 community colleges in the United States.

ACCT provides members with advocacy efforts aimed at federal government as well as educational services, including annual conventions and seminars, instructional publications, and other board leadership services to community college governing boards.

ACCT was founded in 1969 and is headquartered in Washington, D.C.

In 2021, First Lady Jill Biden, who was an instructor in English at Delaware Technical & Community College from 1993 to 2008 and a professor of English at Northern Virginia Community College from 2009 to 2024, spoke at the ACCT annual convention about her experience with community colleges and the need to increase federal funding for them.
