= Noah Deledda =

American artist (born 1978)

Noah Deledda (born August 2, 1978 in Ann Arbor, MI) is an American can sculptor and artist. He spent most of his childhood in the Tampa/St. Petersburg area of Florida. Despite the absence of a formal art education, Deledda gained notoriety in the 1990s, first as a graffiti artist, and then as a graphic design artist.

== Career ==
Deledda's artistic output has spanned a multitude of disciplines, including graphic design, oil painting, graffiti, sculpture and multimedia, fashion, screenprinting, and product design.
