= Rømerhus =

Building in Aarhus, Denmark

Coordinates: 56.1563°N 10.2085°E

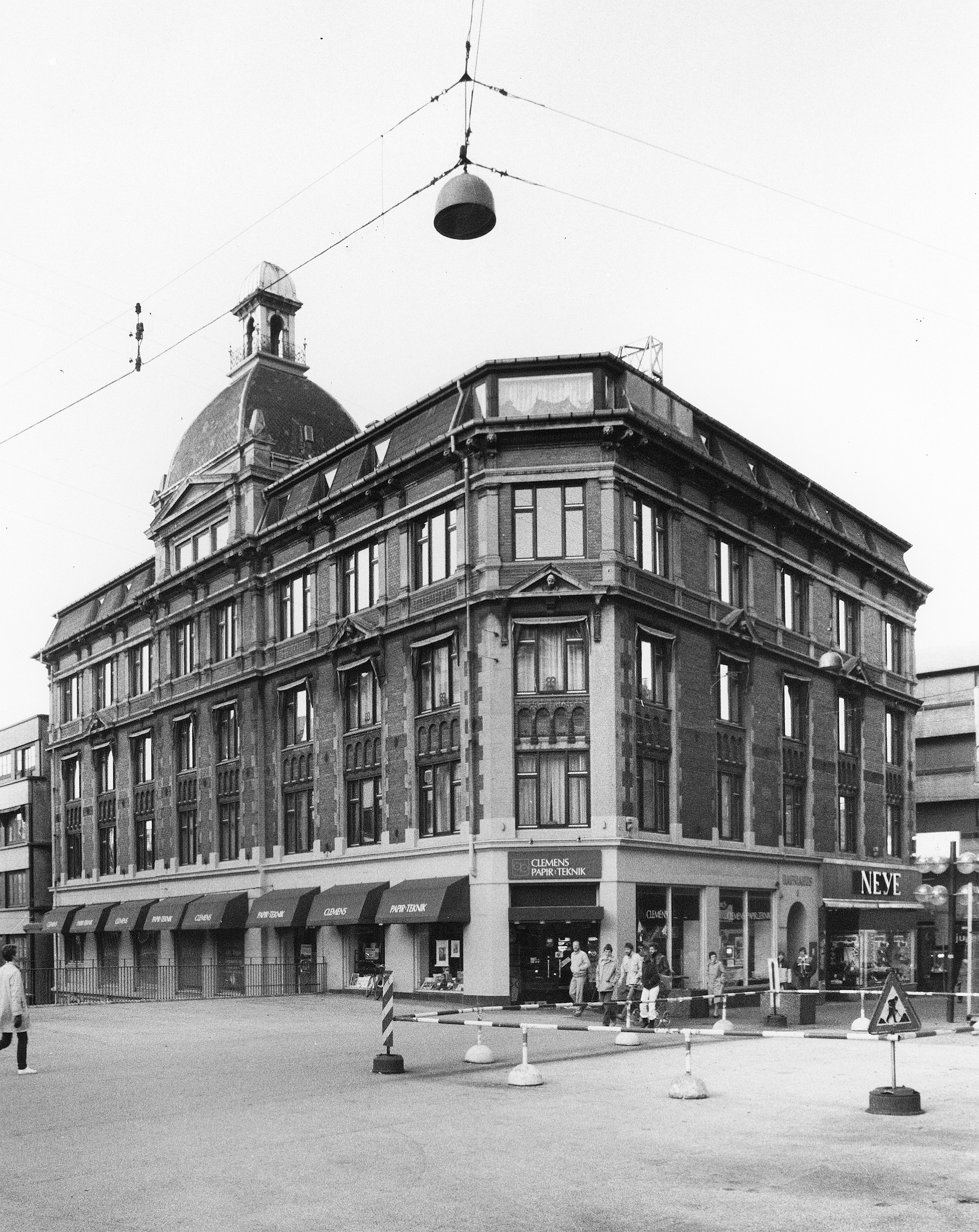
- Rømerhus in 1982

General information
- Architectural style: Revivalism, Italian Renaissance
- Location: Aarhus, Denmark
- Completed: 1895

Design and construction
- Architect(s): Sophus Frederik Kühnel

Rømerhus (formerly Hafniahus) is a building in Aarhus, Denmark in the historic Indre by neighborhood on Skt. Clemens Torv near Store Torv. The building was erected in 1895 by designs of the architect Sophus Frederik Kühnel in a historicist style drawing inspiration from the Italian Renaissance. Rømerhus is located on one of the busiest pedestrian streets in Aarhus and has through its existence primarily been used for commercial purposes.

== History ==
Construction of Rømerhus was completed in 1895. Ownership at the time of construction is not known but the first tenants included the company Crome & Goldschmidts Fabriker which opened a small factory and store on the ground floor facing Skt. Clemens Torv. The company had been founded in Horsens in 1860 with prisoners from Horsens Straffeanstalt (Horsens Penitentiary) as the main source of labor. The store in Rømerhus was the first branch outside Horsens. Another tenant was Johannes Neye who opened a branch of his leather- and gallantry store NEYE in the building on the side facing Skt. Clemens Stræde and Skt. Clemens Torv. NEYE was up to 2015 the second-oldest store on the pedestrian shopping street Strøget, after the store Buus on the corner of Ryesgade and Sønder Allé.

On 15 January 1918 Rømerhus was bought by the bank Jyllandsbanken which stayed in the building for 10 years until it left and sold it to the insurance company Hafnia for 625.000 kroner in 1928. The building was renamed to Hafniahus (Hafnia House). In 1984 Hafnia bought another property, the Regina building on Søndergade, which it also named Hafniahus. Having two buildings named Hafniahus proved confusing so after 56 years it was changed back to the original name Rømerhus. In 2011 the company Bestseller bought the building and contracted the architect firm E+N Arkitektur A/S for a large renovation project aimed at bringing Rømerhus back to its original state.

== Architecture ==
Rømerhus is a four-winged building with a revivalist design drawing inspiration from French and Italian Renaissance architecture. The midsection of the building features a large dome which is thought to draw inspiration from Magasin du Nord's building in Copenhagen. The architect on the project was Sophus Frederik Kühnel who worked on some other significant historicist works in Aarhus such as Mejlborg from 1898 and Business- and Agricultural Bank of Jutland from 1900. The registered constructor on the project is the mason A.I. Petersen. The building is one of four large and notable corner buildings that was constructed to frame St. Clemens Bridge and Aarhus Municipal atlas notes it as the first city block structure in the city. It was built on difficult terrain with large height differences - there are six stories towards Åboulevarden but just 4 stories facing Skt. Clemens Torv.

The Bestseller renovation starting in the 2015 aims to bring Rømerhus back to its original expression. Among other things this will entail putting a spire back on the dome, removing the bay windows and returning the color scheme to the original.

== See also ==
- Architecture of Aarhus
