= Neye =

Neye may refer to:

- Neye (company), Danish company
- Walther Neye (1901 – 1989), German lawyer and rector of Berlin's Humboldt University
- Neye (Wupper), a river of North Rhine-Westphalia, Germany
- Kafr Naya or Kefer Neye, a town in northern Aleppo Governorate, northwestern Syria
