= Sæby =

- Town
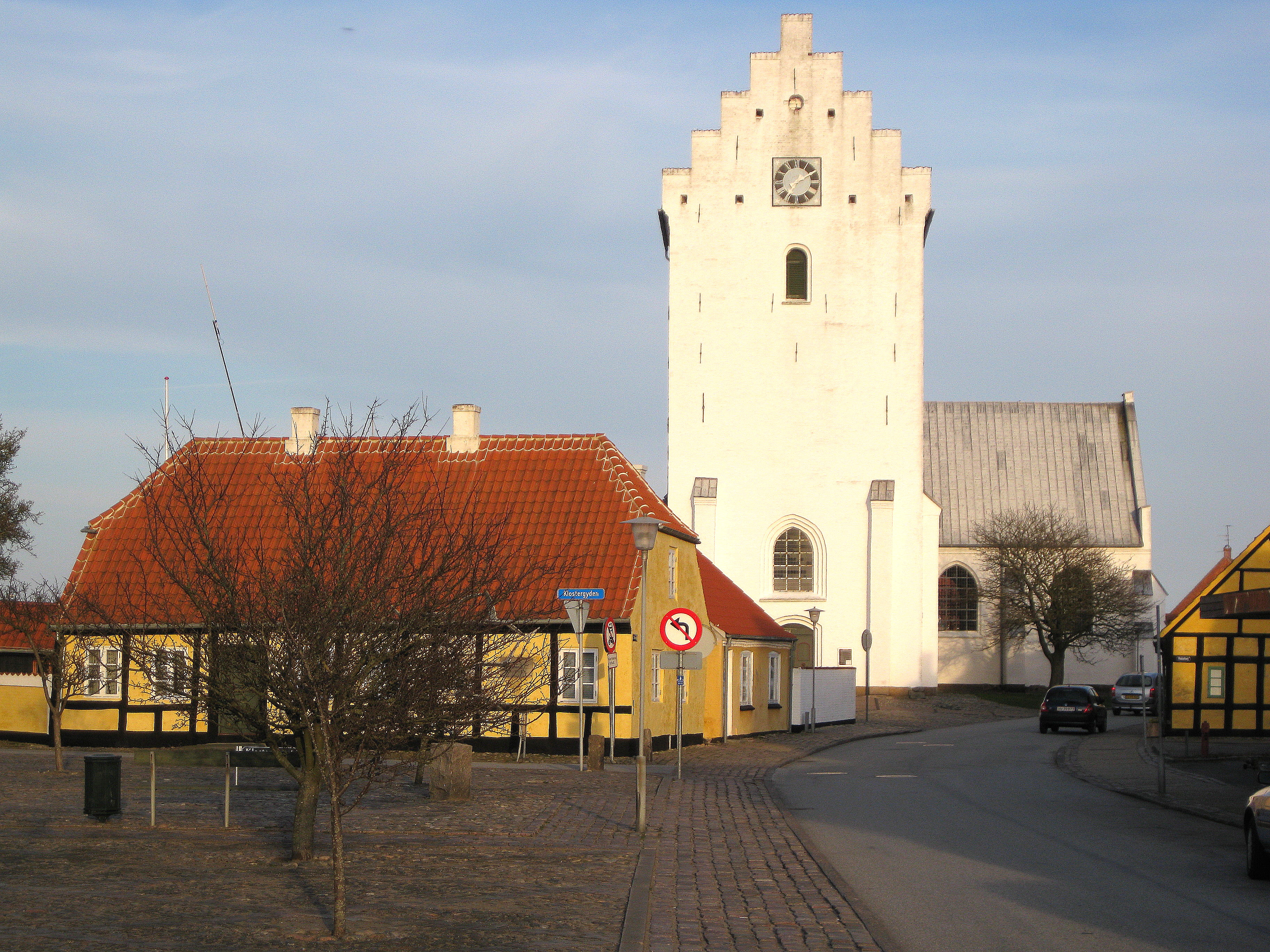
- Sæby Church

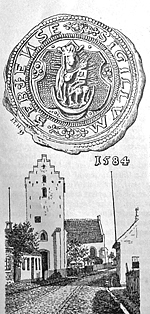
- Seal Coat of arms

- Location in Denmark Sæby (North Jutland Region)
- Coordinates: 57°19′46″N 10°31′56″E
- Country: Denmark
- Region: North Denmark (Nordjylland)
- Municipality: Frederikshavn
- Settled: 11th century
- City status: 1524

Area
  - Urban: 7.8 km^{2} (3.0 sq mi)

Population (2026-01-01)
  - Urban: 9,012
  - Urban density: 1,200/km^{2} (3,000/sq mi)
  - Gender: 4,377 males and 4,635 females
- Time zone: UTC+1 (CET)
  - Summer (DST): UTC+2 (CEST)
- Postal code: 9300

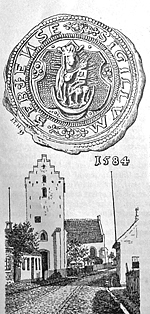
Seal of Saeby, 1584, by J.Th Hansen

Sæby (Danish pronunciation: [ˈseːˌpyˀ]) is a town and seaport located on the east coast of the historical region of Vendsyssel on the North Jutlandic Island in northern Denmark. The town is located in Frederikshavn municipality in Region Nordjylland. It has a population of 9,012 (1 January 2026). Sæby was granted market rights in 1524.

== History ==
Until 2007 Sæby was the main town in Sæby municipality. Since 2007 part of Frederikshavn municipality.

== Attractions ==
- Sæby Glassblowing Workshop
- Sæby Harbour
- Sæby Church
- Fruen fra Havet: 6.25 m. high statue standing on the pier at the entrance to Sæby harbour. The statue was made by artist Marit Benthe Norheim and it was inaugurated in 2001.
- Sæby Museum
- Sæby Old Town
- Sæby Teddies (two persons in teddy-bear costumes)
- Sæby Watermill
- Sæbygaard Manor: A manor house from the renaissance. Inside there is a small museum with exhibitions of historical furniture.
- Sæby Beach
- Sæby Townsquare

== Notable people ==
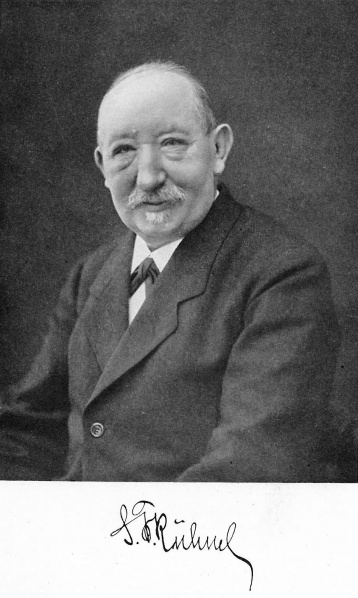
Sophus Frederik Kühnel, 1911

=== Science & Business ===
- Jacob Severin (1691 in Sæby – 1753) a Danish merchant who held a trade monopoly on Greenland from 1733 to 1749
- Sophus Frederik Kühnel (1851 in Sæby – 1930) a Danish architect, designed Mejlborg and a number of other buildings in Aarhus
- Adam Giede Böving (1869 in Sæby – 1957) a Danish-American entomologist and zoologist, studied the larvae of the order Coleoptera

=== The Arts ===
- Henry Holst (1899 in Sæby – 1991) a Danish violinist, variously at the Berlin Philharmonic Orchestra, the Royal Manchester College of Music, the Royal College of Music and the Royal Danish Academy of Music.
- Carl Ottosen (1918 – 1972 in Saeby) a Danish actor, screenwriter and film director, appearing in 70 films
- Walter Kuhlman (1918–2009) an American painter and printmaker, linked to Abstract Expressionism and American Figurative Expressionism, brought up in Sæby
- Jørgen Rømer (1923 in Saeby – 2007) a Danish art historian, graphic artist and painter
- Lene Siel (born 1968 in Saeby) a Danish singer

=== Sport ===
- Merete Pedersen (born 1973 in Saeby) a Danish former footballer, member of the Danish national team for 16 years
- Rasmus Thellufsen (born 1997 in Saeby) a Danish footballer, playing for AaB
