= Noah Wolff =

German Jewish industrialist and philanthropist (1809–1907)

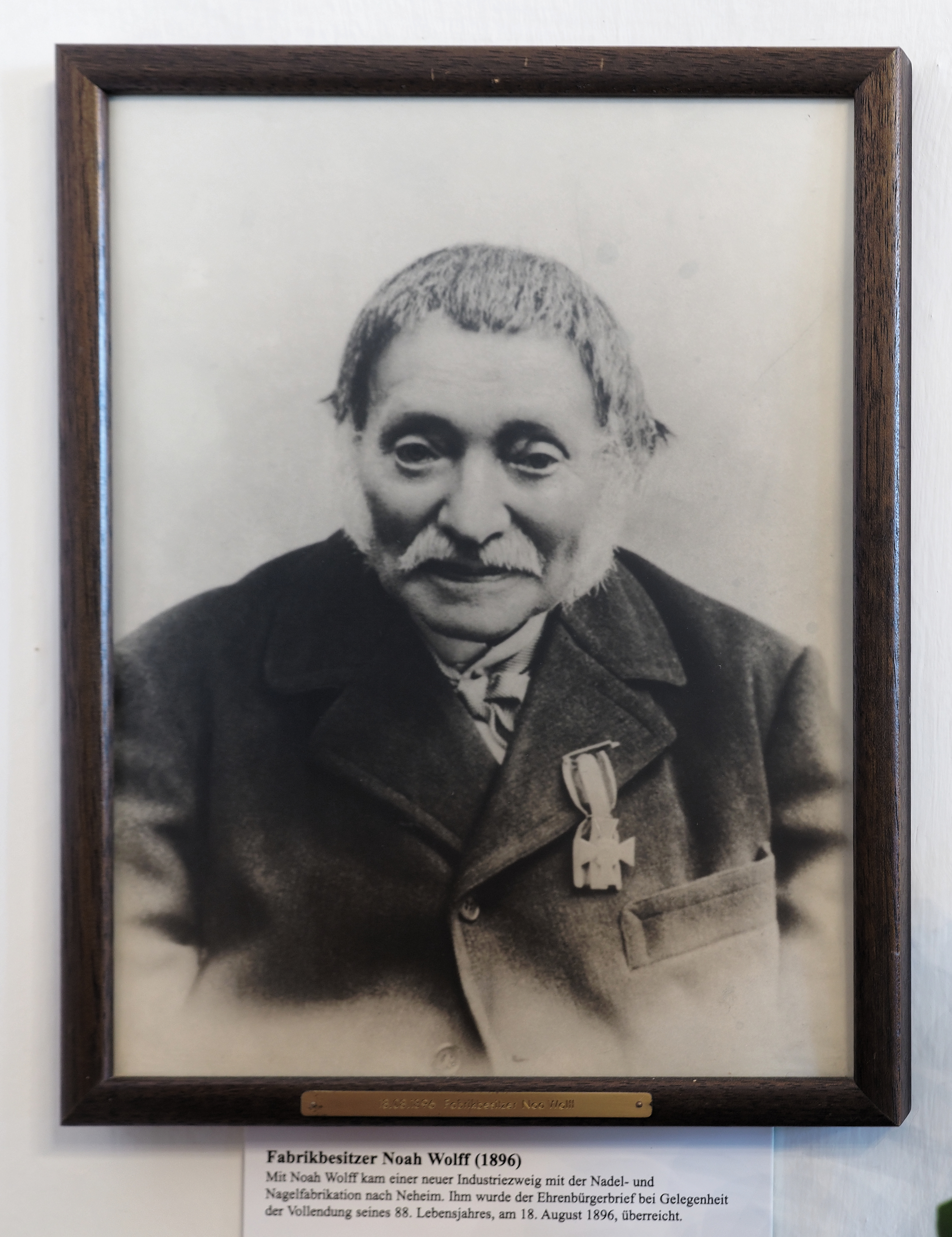
- Born: August 18, 1809
- Died: October 4, 1907 (aged 98)
- Known for: Industrialist, German Jewish community leader

Noah Wolff (August 18, 1809 – October 4, 1907) was an industrialist and Jewish community leader in Neheim, Germany (now Arnsberg). His headstone at the Neheim Jewish Cemetery (German: Jüdischer Friedhof Neheim) was washed away by the Dambusters raid flood in 1943 and unexpectedly found intact in 2012 during a construction project along the Ruhr. The gravemarker was restored and returned to the cemetery.

Wolff and his brother ran a company called Gebrüder Wolff. They originally produced pins, needles, umbrella frames, and fishing tools, and later kerosene lamps and electrical equipment. In 1857 Wolff was the head of the synagogue district Arnsberg and was the main benefactor who funded the construction of the Neiheim Synagogue in 1876. The synagogue was destroyed on Kristallnacht in 1938 but was restored in 1985 and is used as a community space.

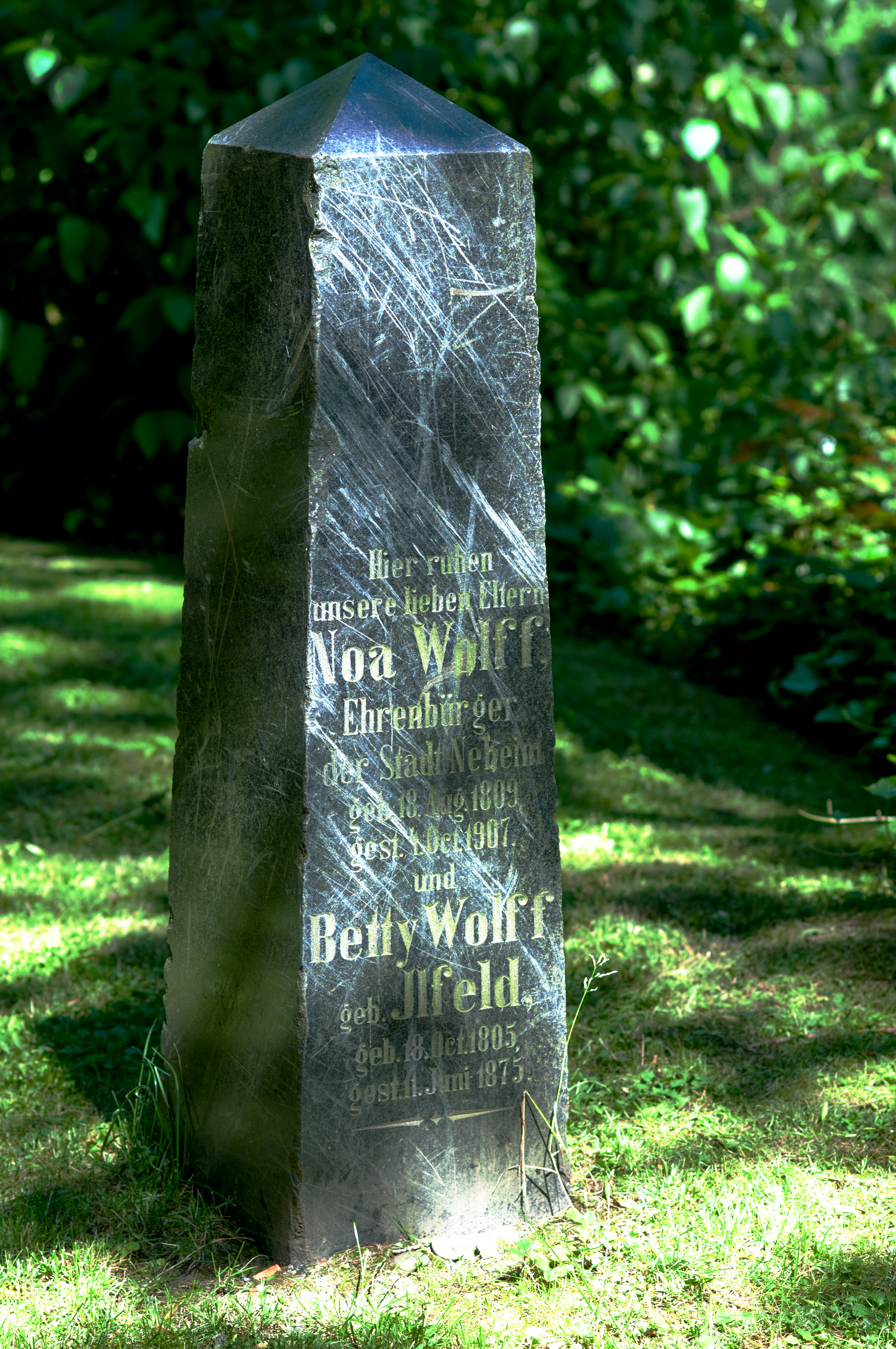
Obelisk for Wolff and his wife
