= Lene Siel =

Danish singer (born 1968)

Lene Siel (born 21 August 1968) is a Danish singer. She was born in Sæby. Siel studied at both Aalborg University and Copenhagen Business School.

As a child she started to perform with her parents. Her father was Kurt Siel, a guitarist, and her mother Svanhild was a singer. She has recorded duets with among others John Denver (Perhaps love), Helmut Lotti, Roger Whittaker, David Garrett (musician) and Paul Potts.

== Discography ==
- Lene Siel (1991)
- Mod vinden (1993)
- Nu tændes tusind julelys (1994)
- Før mig til havet (1995)
- Mine favoritter (1996)
- I Danmark er jeg født (1998)
- Salte tårer - Søde kys (1999)
- Aftenstemning (2000)
- Som en bro over mørke vande (2002)
- Gospel (2004)
- De stille timer (2005)
- Great Moments (2007)
- Himlen i min favn (2009)
- Forelsket (2013)
