= Jens Beckmann =

German-Australian chemist (born 1970)

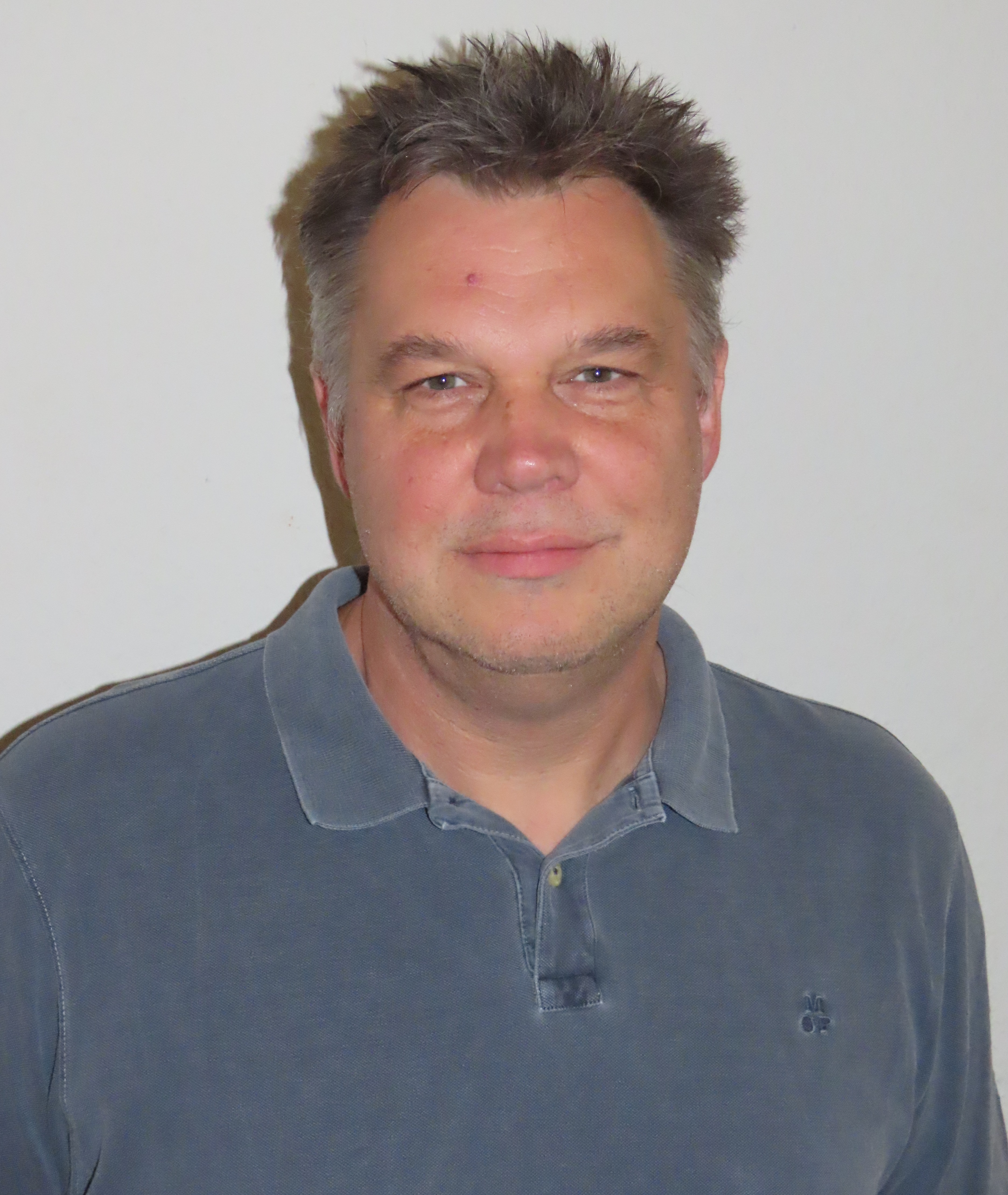
- Beckmann in 2024
- Born: 24 December 1970 (age 55); Arnsberg, Germany
- Education: University of Dortmund (now Technical University of Dortmund), Dr. rer. nat. in 1999
- Known for: the preparation of reactive and functional molecules including the first stable nitrene
- Scientific career
- Fields: Inorganic chemistry Organometallic chemistry
- Workplaces: Dortmund University, Deakin University Geelong, Free University Berlin, University of Bremen

Jens Beckmann (born 1970) is a German-Australian scientist working as professor in the area of synthetic inorganic and organometallic chemistry at the University of Bremen since 2010. Previously he worked as assistant professor at the Free University of Berlin (2004–2010) and as lecturer at Deakin University in Geelong (2002–2004). He is best known for the preparation of reactive and functional molecules including the first stable nitrene.

== Early life and education ==
Beckmann was born in December 1970 in Arnsberg, Westphalia, Germany, and grew up in the near village of Oeventrop. He graduated from the Gymnasium Laurentianum Arnsberg obtaining his Abitur in 1990. He studied Chemistry at the University of Dortmund, where he obtained his Diploma in 1995 and his Ph.D. ("Dr. rer nat.") in 1999 under the supervision of Prof Klaus Jurkschat. Starting in early 2000, he worked for two years as Feodor Lynen fellow of the Alexander von Humboldt foundation at Deakin University Geelong under the guidance of Prof Dainis Dakternieks.

== Career ==
Beckmann's first independent facility position was at the Centre for Chiral and Molecular Technologies at Deakin. With his small research group, he investigated functional organotin and organotellurium compounds including polymeric telluroxanes and bimetallic systems capable of absorbing carbon dioxide from air.

Besides his academic work, he was involved in the commercial research activities of the spin-off company Chirogen Pty Ltd in 2002 to 2004, developing enantioselective reducing agents.

At the Institute for Chemistry and Biochemistry, he continued working as an assistant professor from 2004 to 2010 with his group on heavy p-block element compounds, which included (mixed valent) tellurium halides, and well-defined tellurinic, telluronic and stibonic acids.

Since 2010, he has been an associate professor at the University of Bremen. At the Faculty for Biology and Chemistry, Beckmann co-founded the Institute for Inorganic Chemistry and Crystallography in 2015. His research interests span a wide range including topics in Lewis Acid Chemistry, Brønsted Acid Chemistry, Carbene Analogous, Radical Chemistry, (Photoluminescent) Coinage Meal Complexes and Metal Organic Frameworks (MOFs).

In 2020 his group published sila-ibuprofen, a derivative of the painkiller ibuprofen, using a silicon/carbon switch strategy to improve the solubility.

In 2024 his group published the first stable nitrene with a triplet electronic ground state.

== Awards and honors ==
- Rudolf Chaudoire-Award of the University of Dortmund for the best Ph.D. thesis in 1999.
- Feodor Lynen Scholarship of the Alexander von Humboldt-Foundation
- Doctor honoris causa from the N. N. Vorozhtsov Novosibrisk Institute of Organic Chemistry of the Russian Academy of Science, Siberian Branch.

== Books & publications ==
He is the author of more than 270 peer-reviewed publications, 9 book chapters and 16 patent applications.
