= Aarhus Fire Station =

Coordinates: 56.1615°N 10.2031°E

- Aarhus Brandstation
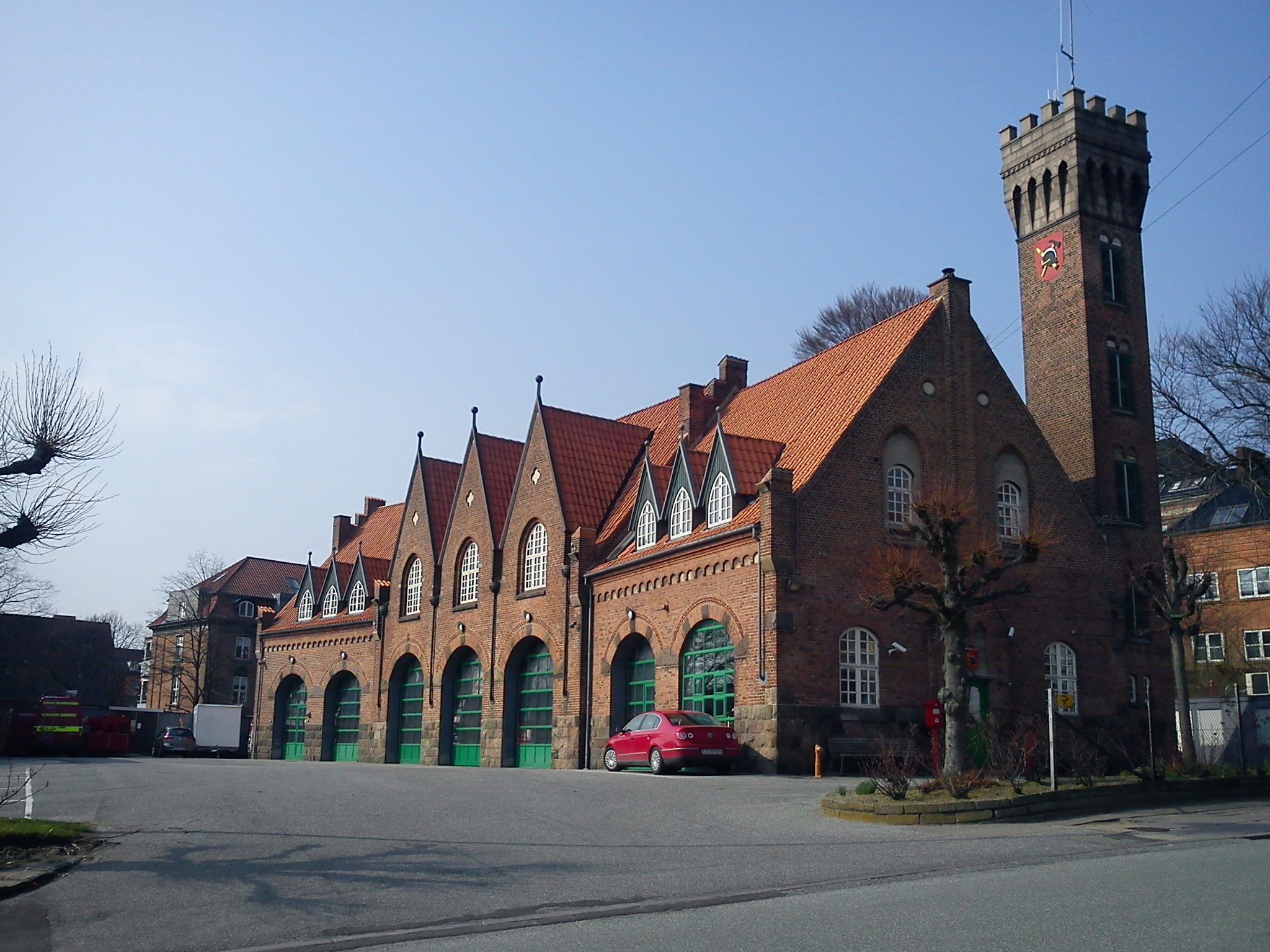
- Interactive map of the Aarhus Fire Station area

General information
- Location: Aarhus, Denmark
- Completed: 1905

Aarhus Fire Station (Danish: Aarhus Brandstation) is a fire station in Aarhus, Denmark from 1904 situated on Ny Munkegade 15. The station is still in use (2016) and is the oldest fire station in Aarhus.

In the end of the 1800s the Aarhus Fire Department consisted mostly of small pumping stations but the explosive population growth of the previous decades meant the city needed a modern fire station. The initiative and organization behind the new fire station was mainly fire and building inspector Eduard Ludvig Frederik Springborg. Springborg early on advocated for a new fire station and asked the City Council to make the areaBispetoften available.

The city council committee for City Expansion and Construction (Udvalget for Byens Udvidelse og Bebyggelse) couldn't accept the placement on Bispetoften - the area by the Aarhus Concert Hall and the City Hall Par. Instead the committee made an area by Ny Munkegade and Thunøgade available, an area already used by the Fire Department for training. The building was constructed by plans of the architect Sophus Frederik Kühnel who also designed Elise Smiths Skole next to it.

== Architecture ==
The architect of the station was Sophus Frederik Kühnel who was interested in the Italian Renaissance architecture and National romantic architecture which was starting at this time. These inspirations have played a role in the design of the building; constructed of red bricks on a lightly curved base of ashlar. The architectural inspirations is especially visible in the pointed gables, pointy-arched windows, bay windows and the pompous expression of the tower. The building also has characteristic green garages.
