= Arnsberg =

- Town
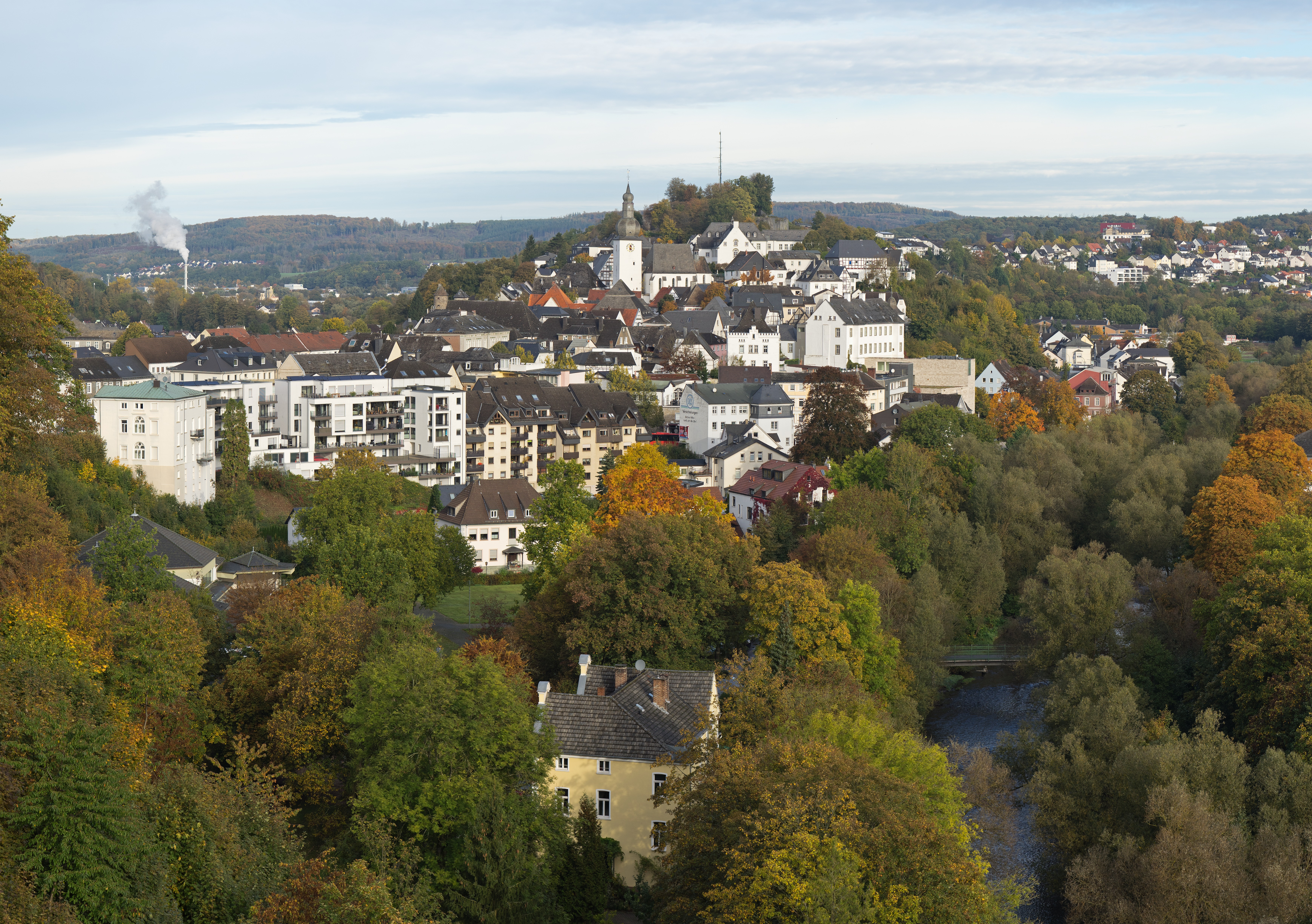

- Flag Coat of arms

- Location of Arnsberg within Hochsauerlandkreis district
- Interactive map of Arnsberg
- Location within Germany Location within North Rhine-Westphalia
- Coordinates: 51°23′N 8°5′E
- Country: Germany
- State: North Rhine-Westphalia
- Admin. region: Arnsberg
- District: Hochsauerlandkreis
- Subdivisions: 15

Government
  - Mayor (2025–30): Ralf Paul Bittner (SPD)

Area
  - Total: 193.72 km^{2} (74.80 sq mi)
- Elevation: 212 m (696 ft)

Population (2025-12-31)
  - Total: 74,479
  - Density: 384.47/km^{2} (995.77/sq mi)
- Time zone: UTC+01:00 (CET)
  - Summer (DST): UTC+02:00 (CEST)
- Postal codes: 59755, 59757, 59759, 59821, 59823
- Dialling codes: 02931 Arnsberg; 02932 Neheim-Hüsten; 02935 Wennigloh; 02937 Oeventrop
- Vehicle registration: HSK
- Website: www.arnsberg.de

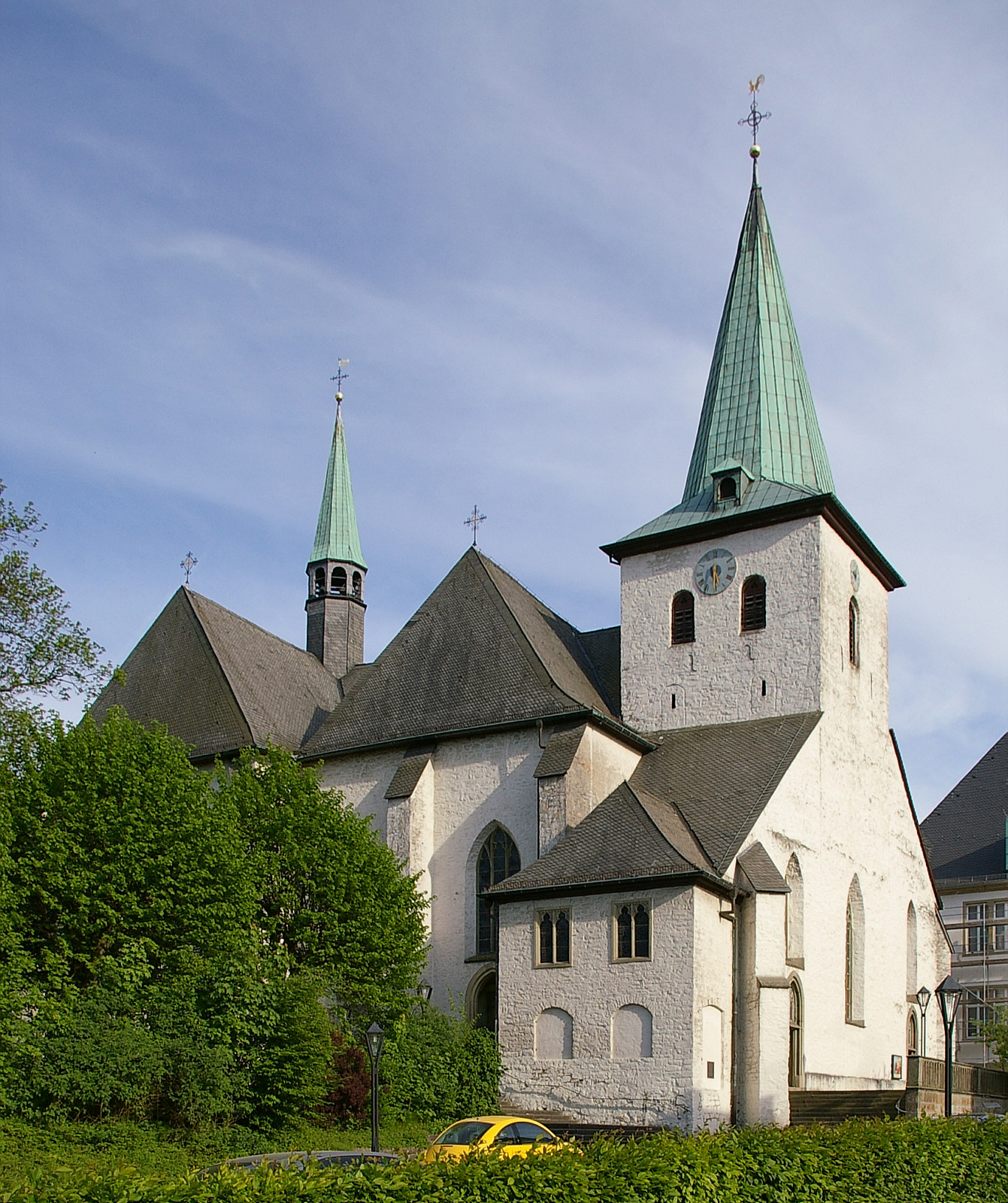
Propsteikirche

Arnsberg (German pronunciation: [ˈaʁnsbɛʁk]; Westphalian: Arensperg) is a town in the Hochsauerland county, in the German state of North Rhine-Westphalia. It is the location of the Regierungsbezirk Arnsberg administration and one of the three local administration offices of the Hochsauerlandkreis district.

== Geography ==
=== Location ===
Arnsberg is located in the north-east of the Sauerland in the Ruhr river valley. The river Ruhr meanders around the south of the old town of Arnsberg. The town is nearly completely encircled by forest, and the nature park Arnsberger Wald lies to the north. Its neighbouring municipalities are: Ense, Möhnesee,Warstein, Meschede, Sundern, Balve, and Menden.

Arnsberg is connected by Federal Motorway 46 (Autobahn 46) Brilon in the east and (using the Federal Motorway 445) to Werl in the west. It is also connected by several railroad stations, which provide a connection to the major city Dortmund and the Ruhrgebiet. There is also a regional airport, located in the city district of Vosswinkel, which is exclusively used for small private aircraft.

The municipal territory spans a distance of up to 13 kilometres (8.1 mi) from the southern to the northern limits.

=== Subdivisions ===
Since the local government reforms of 1975, Arnsberg has consisted of 15 boroughs (Ortsteile):

- Neheim (23,448 inhabitants)
- Arnsberg (19,355 inhabitants)
- Hüsten (11,304 inhabitants)
- Oeventrop (6,713 inhabitants)
- Herdringen (4,118 inhabitants)
- Bruchhausen (3,337 inhabitants)
- Müschede (2,870 inhabitants)
- Voßwinkel (2,523 inhabitants)
- Niedereimer (2,082 inhabitants)
- Holzen (2,022 inhabitants)
- Rumbeck (1,305 inhabitants)
- Wennigloh (1,004 inhabitants)
- Bachum (959 inhabitants)
- Breitenbruch (219 inhabitants)
- Uentrop (346 inhabitants)

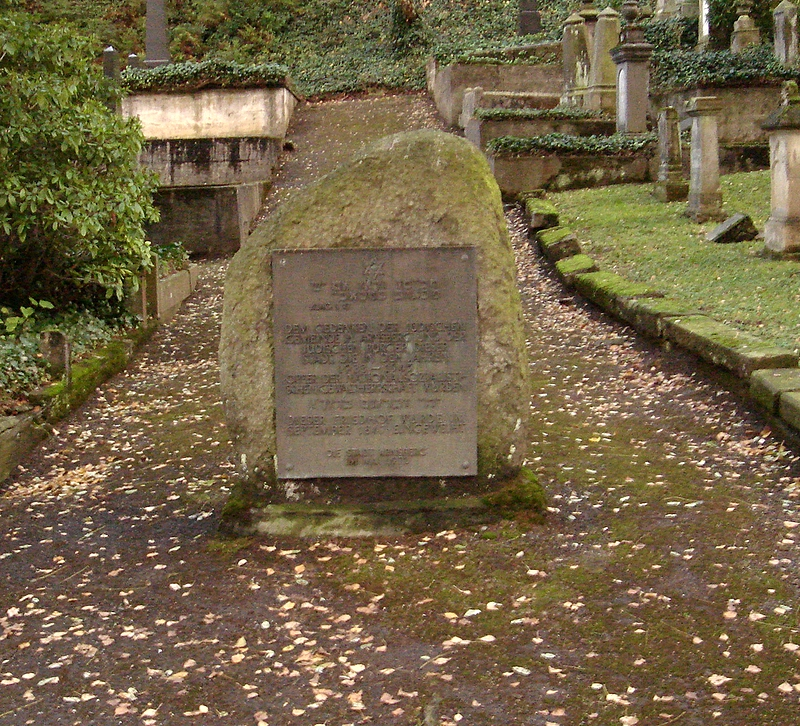
Jewish cemetery

== History ==
=== Beginnings ===
Arnsberg was first mentioned in 789 in the Carolingian records (Urbar) as belonging to the abbey of Werden.

Arnsberg was the seat of the Counts of Arnsberg from around 1070 and received city rights in 1238. In 1368 Gottfried IV, the last Count of Arnsberg, handed over the city and county to the Electorate of Cologne as he had no heir, whereafter it was incorporated into the Duchy of Westphalia (a possession of Cologne).

They built Arnsberg Castle there, whose remains can still be visited and are occasionally used for public celebrations.

In the 12th century, old Arnsberg became the seat of Westphalian jurisdiction (whose coat of arms is still used today by the Hochsauerlandkreis). Later, the city lost its independence and was subject to the Electors (Archbishops) of Cologne.

=== 18th/19th Century ===
Arnsberg Castle was reconstructed by Johann Conrad Schlaun as a residential palace and hunting lodge for Elector Clemens August of Bavaria. It was destroyed in the Seven Years' War in 1769.

In 1794 the French attacked Cologne, so parts of the treasure of the Cologne Cathedral were brought to safety in Arnsberg, along with the relics of the Biblical Magi. In 1804, the treasure was returned to Cologne, as commemorated by a plaque in the Propsteikirche.

In 1816, Arnsberg came under Prussian rule and was made a local administrative centre.

=== World War Two ===
Neheim and Hüsten were merged in 1941.

During the Second World War, Arnsberg first suffered widespread destruction and catastrophic loss of lives when RAF Lancasters breached the dam of the Möhne Reservoir on the night of 16 to 17 May 1943 (Operation Chastise). The nearby Abbey Himmelpforten was completely washed away.

Later, dozens of Arnsberg's citizens were killed in several British air raids aimed at destroying the railway viaduct. The targets were finally destroyed on 19 March 1945 using a 'Grand Slam' bomb.

=== Contemporary history ===
The current city of Arnsberg was created in 1975 by merging 12 surrounding municipalities (Bachum, Breitenbruch, Herdringen, Holzen, Müschede, Niedereimer, Oeventrop, Rumbeck, Uentrop, Voßwinkel and Wennigloh) into one city.

Old Arnsberg itself and Neheim-Hüsten are the two main urban areas, while the other parts are mainly rural areas.

== Demographics ==
Historical population

Year	Pop.	±% p.a.
1965	77,005	—
1970	80,537	+0.90%
1975	80,285	−0.06%
1980	78,057	−0.56%
1985	74,967	−0.80%
1990	75,864	+0.24%
1995	78,972	+0.81%

Year	Pop.	±% p.a.
2000	77,473	−0.38%
2005	76,427	−0.27%
2010	74,227	−0.58%
2015	73,784	−0.12%
2020	73,487	−0.08%
2025	74,479	+0.27%

Source: Landesdatabank Nordrhein-Westfalen

=== Religion ===
Arnsberg's population is mostly Roman Catholic. Arnsberg belongs to the Archdiocese of Paderborn. Catholic churches include the "Propsteikirche" or the "Heilig-Kreuz Kirche" and the "Auferstehungskirche", which is a Protestant church. There is also a New Apostolic congregation. In recent years, Arnsberg's Muslim minority has grown considerably, and the town has a mosque. The cemeteries are mostly Catholic but there is also a Jewish cemetery.

== Arts and culture ==
The Kunstverein Arnsberg operates in Arnsberg. Founded in 1987 and devoted to contemporary art, Kunstverein Arnsberg has presented solo exhibitions by artists including Georg Baselitz, Thomas Ruff, Karin Sander, Dan Perjovschi, Boris Mikhailov, Gregor Schneider, Erwin Wurm, the Turner Prize winner Susan Philipsz and the Marcel Duchamp Prize winner Laurent Grasso.

== Government ==
=== City arms ===
The arms of the city depict a white eagle on a blue field. Earlier it was a white eagle on a red field, introduced in 1278 and as used by the counts of Arnsberg . In the 17th century the red was changed to blue, reflecting the Bavarian blue of the House of Wittelsbach.

=== City council ===
After the 2025 elections, the Arnsberg city council is composed as follows:

Party	Votes	%	+/-	Seats	+/-
Christian Democratic Union (CDU)	12,051	36.6	▼1.8	16	▼4
Social Democratic Party (SPD)	11,450	34.8	▲6.6	16	▲1
Alternative for Germany (AfD)	4,065	12.4	▲8.2	6	▲4
Alliance 90/The Greens (Grüne)	2,697	8.2	▼6.0	4	▼3
Free Democratic Party (FDP)	825	2.5	▼4.3	1	▼3
The PARTY (PARTEI)	731	2.2	▼1.4	1	▼1
The Left (Linke)	628	1.9	▼0.3	1	±0
Sauerland Citizens' List (SBL)	434	1.3	▼0.9	1	±0
Independent Daniela Wiesel	13	0.0	New	0	New
Valid votes	32,894	98.6			
Invalid votes	472	1.4			
Total	33,366	100.0		46	▼6
Electorate/voter turnout	58,926	56.6			
Source: City of Arnsberg

=== Mayors ===
Mayors of the new town Arnsberg

Years	Mayor	Party
1975–1984:	Gerhard Teriet	CDU
1984–1999:	Alex Paust	SPD
1999–2017:	Hans-Josef Vogel	CDU
2018–today:	Ralf Paul Bittner	SPD

== Twin towns – sister cities ==
Arnsberg is twinned with:

- Alba Iulia, Romania
- Deventer, Netherlands
- Bexley, England, United Kingdom
- Olesno, Poland
- Caltagirone, Italy

== Notable people ==
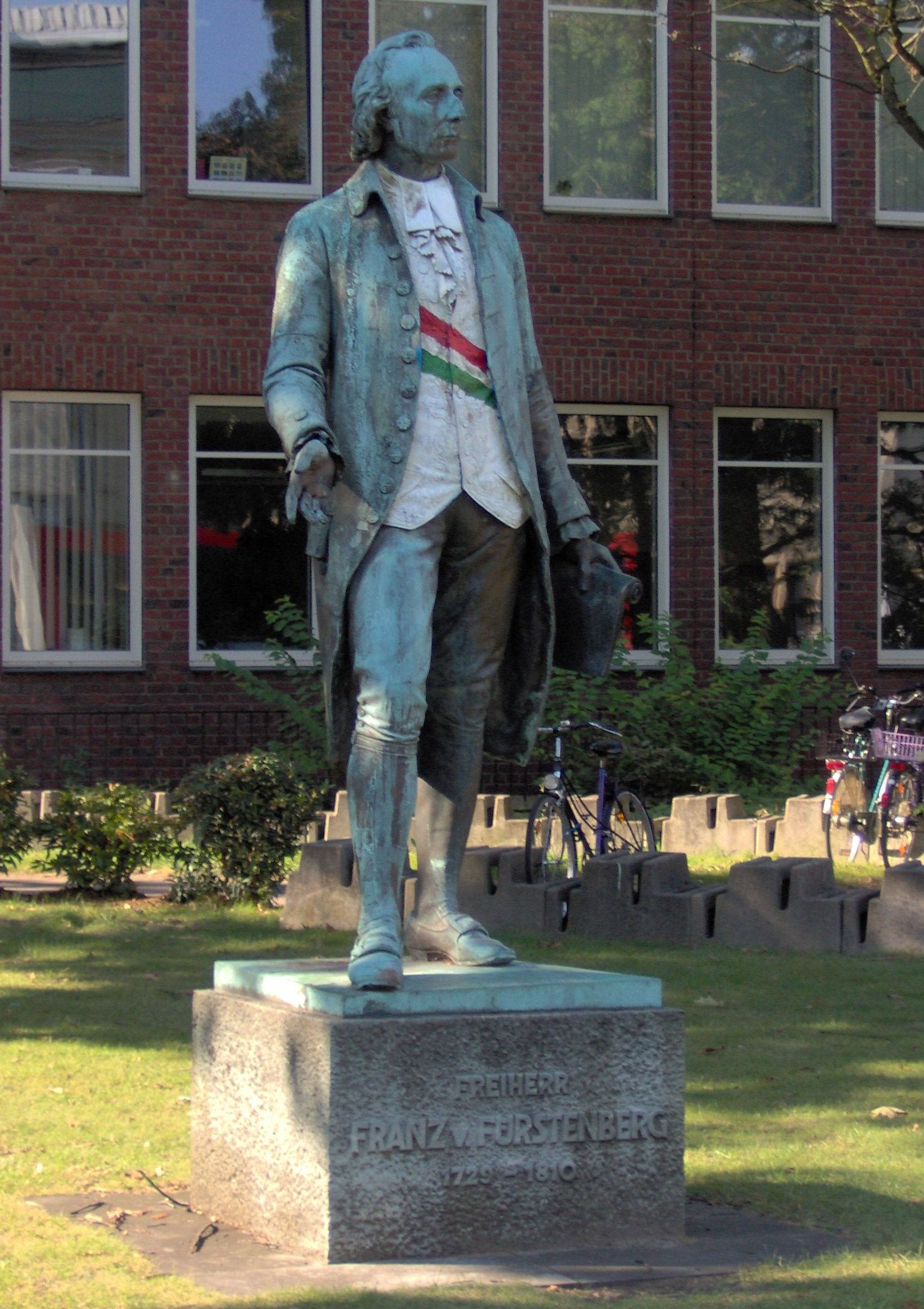
Statue Franz von Fürstenberg in Münster

- Franz von Fürstenberg (1729–1810), statesman and reformer school in Archbishopric Münster, founder of the Münster University
- Wilhelm Hasenclever, (1837–1889), politician
- Noah Wolff – German Jewish industrialist and philanthropist (1809–1907)
- Karl Brüggemann (1896–1977), honorary district in Kreis Arnsberg from 1961 to 1969
- Franz Stock (1904–1948), since 1934 pastor of the German Catholic community in Paris, during the German occupation chaplain for French prisoners (companion sentenced to death), 1945 head of a prisoner of war seminar in Chartres
- Hans Bernd Gisevius, (1904–1974), diplomat
- Fritz Cremer, (1906–1993), artist
- Betsy von Furstenberg, (1931–2015), actress
- Günter Wewel, (1934–2023), operatic bass and television presenter
- Franz Müntefering, (born 1940), politician (SPD)
- Mike de Vries, (born 1958), brand and business manager
- Andrea Fischer (born 1960), politician (Alliance 90/The Greens) and journalist, former Federal Minister of Health
- Meinolf Finke, (born 1963), poet
- Jens Beckmann (born 1970), scientist
- Helena Fromm (born 1987), taekwondo athlete, Olympic medalist
- Georg Poplutz, tenor

=== People related to Arnsberg ===
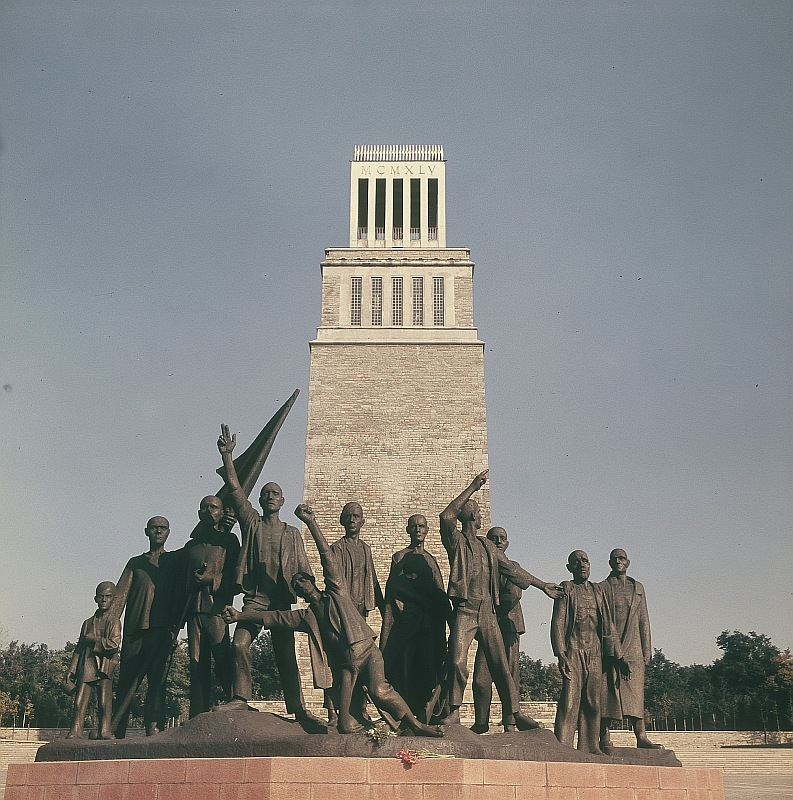
Buchenwald memorial

- Paul Moder (1896–1942), politician (NSDAP), Freikorps member and SS officer
- Walther Neye (1901–1989), jurist and rector of the Humboldt University of Berlin
- Fritz Cremer (1906–1993), sculptor (Buchenwald Memorial)
- Lothar Collatz (1910–1990), mathematician
- Günter Keute (born 1955), footballer
- Friedrich Merz (born 1955), attorney and politician, member of the CDU
- Meinolf Finke (born 1963), poet
- Stephan Kampwirth (born 1967), theatre actor, film actor and voice actor
- Rouven Schröder (born 1975), footballer
- Philipp Hofmann (born 1993), footballer

== Gallery ==
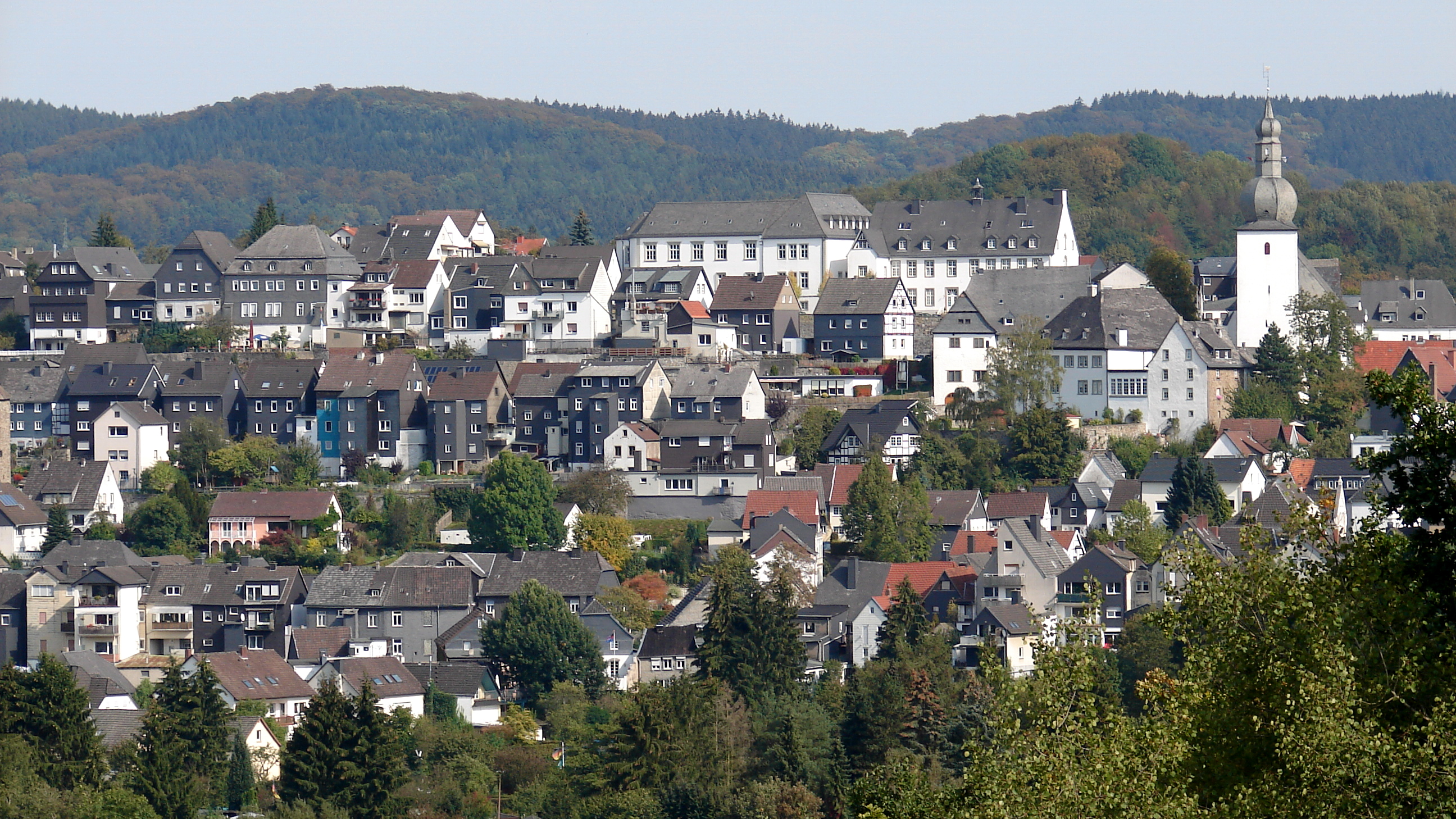
Arnsberg

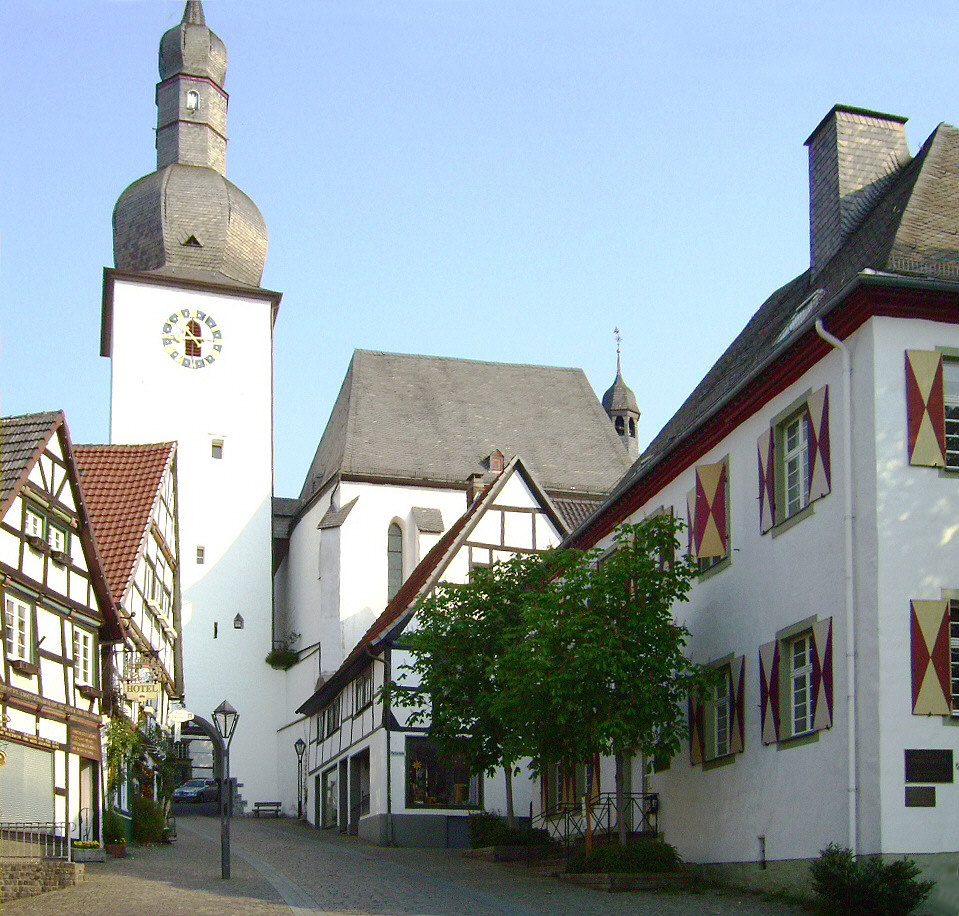
Glockenturm (Bell tower)

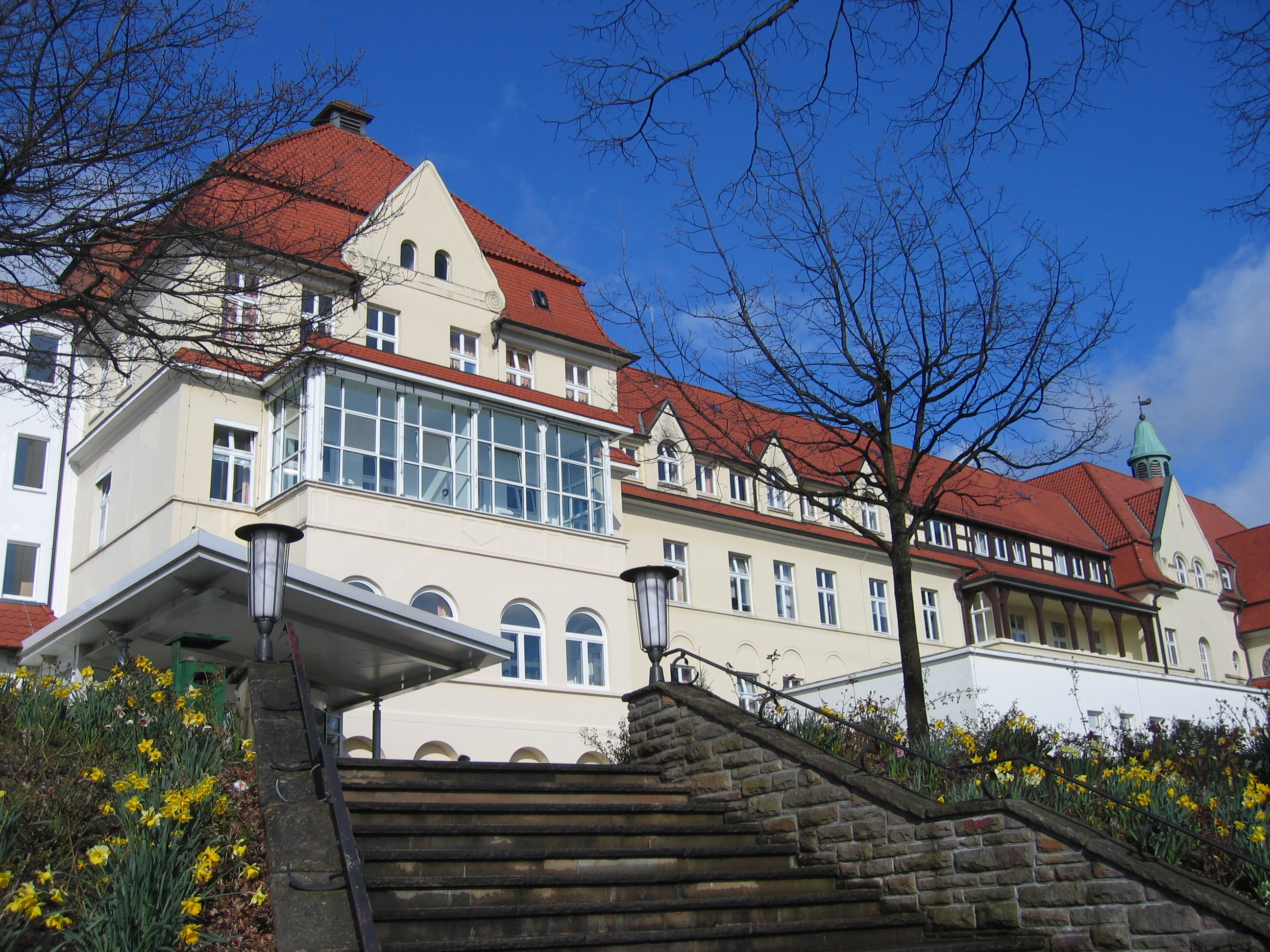
Marienhospital (hospital)

View of Arnsberg from the Ehmsen-Memorial

== See also ==
- Herdringen Castle
