= Mike de Vries =

German manager

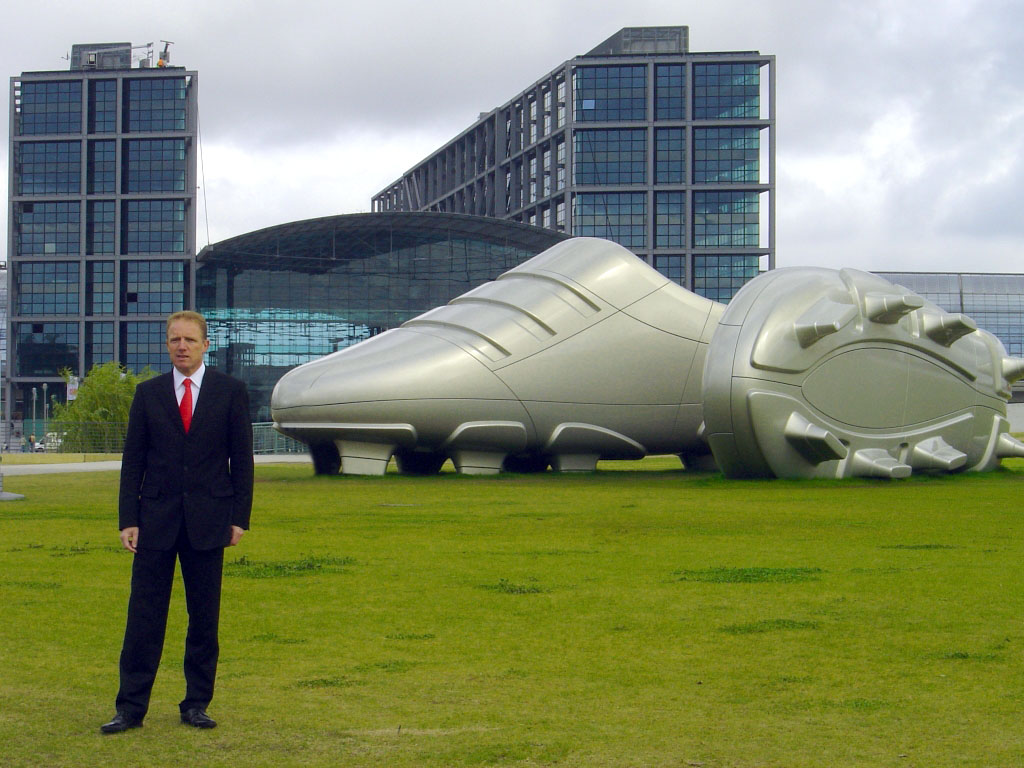
- Born: December 8, 1958 (age 67); Arnsberg
- Education: German Sport University Cologne; Steinbeis University Berlin; DePaul University; Indiana University
- Occupations: Brand manager, business consultant
- Employer(s): Leipzig 2012 GmbH; Marketing für Deutschland GmbH; International Football Village
- Known for: CEO of Germany – Land of Ideas national marketing initiative managing director for the Leipzig 2012 Olympic bid campaign

Mike de Vries (German pronunciation: [maɪk də fʁiːs], born on 8 December 1958 in Arnsberg, Germany), is a German manager specializing in brands and business development; his positions have included CEO of the "Germany – Land of Ideas" national marketing initiative. De Vries was most recently the CEO of the International Football Village for the 2010 FIFA World Cup in South Africa.

== Career ==
De Vries achieved two university degrees; the first as a fencing master at the Academy of Fencing of Germany in Essen and Tauberbischofsheim, his second as a graduate sports teacher at the German Sport University Cologne. Finally, he was awarded an MBA degree after an international business degree course in Germany and the USA (Steinbeis University Berlin, DePaul University Chicago, Kelley School of Business, Indiana University) in 2005.

After acting as the federal head coach for the German modern pentathlon association (1988–1993), sports director (1993–1996) and general secretary (1996–1998) of the German field hockey association, De Vries served as the head of the sponsoring & marketing department and, later, division manager of Bitburger Brewery Th. Simon GmbH (1998–2003). As an authorized signatory to the brewery, he focused on marketing, press and public relations, sponsoring and event management. In addition, he headed the technical company's service department and trade fair management. His activities at the company included developing a brand communications strategy centered on the Olympic National Committee, the German Football Association (DFB), and Formula 1, while acting as the official speaker of the German House at the 2000 Summer Olympics in Sydney. The 2002 FIFA advertising campaign with the Germany national team received an award in 2003 from the German POS Marketing Association.

The year 2003, also saw De Vries appointed as the CEO of Leipzig 2012 GmbH by the National Olympic Committee of Germany, managing Germany's bid campaign for the 2012 Summer Olympics.

After Leipzig's elimination as a candidate for the 2012 Olympics, De Vries was appointed CEO of FC Deutschland GmbH at the beginning of 2005; FC Deutschland GmbH changed its name to Marketing für Deutschland GmbH in 2007. His appointment was -the Handelsblatt reported- aimed at extending and coordinating the "Germany – Land of Ideas" initiative of the Federal Government of Germany and German industry, represented by the Federation of German Industries. The initiative was founded as an image campaign for Germany in the 2006 FIFA cup in Germany under the patronage of Germany's Federal President of the time, Horst Köhler. De Vries coordinated all of the companies and organizations involved, working with the German government and FIFA. Twenty-three German companies – mostly listed on the DAX – took part in the initiative. The first communications projects included support for the 31-country tour with Franz Beckenbauer, the "Welcome to Germany" initiative, the "Walk of Ideas" sculpture (which received the 2006 EVA Award, the Golden Flame Award and the German PR prize of 2007), as well as "365 places in the land of ideas" (a series of events that received the European Excellence Award). Most of the initiative's activities have moved outside Germany since the 2006 FIFA Cup; these include a three-year series of events, "Germany and China – moving together" as well as the Shanghai EXPO in 2010. Germany increased its Nation Brands Index from 7 (2005) to 1 (2008), which was partly a result of these networked communications activities; the nation marketing initiative received the silver medal and politics award in 2006 at the AME Awards in New York.

Mike de Vries advised South African government institutions and the Local Organizing Committee (LOC) on knowledge transfer in using major sports events and communications platforms towards the 2010 FIFA since 2007, and is currently negotiating with Brazil on preparing for the 2014 FIFA World Cup. In March 2010 he along with South African partners founded the "International Football Village" which received over 100000 visitors as a private fan park and hospitality platform of the FIFA World Cup.

De Vries, member of the Association for Place Branding and Public Diplomacy, also lectures and works in consulting on nation branding, destination marketing, strategic communication and brand management.

== Bibliography ==
- Michael Schaffrath (Hrsg.): Sport ist Kommunikation, first edition. LIT, 2009, ISBN 3-8258-1877-2
