= Günter Keute =

German footballer

Personal information
- Full name: Günter Keute
- Date of birth: 21 December 1955 (age 70)
- Place of birth: Arnsberg, Germany
- Height: 1.77 m (5 ft 9 1/2 in)
- Position: Striker

Senior career*
Years	Team	Apps	(Gls)
- SV Hüsten 09
- SC Neheim-Hüsten
1980–1984	Eintracht Braunschweig	108	(20)
Total		108	(20)
- * Club domestic league appearances and goals as of 26 April 2012

Günter Keute (born 21 December 1955) is a retired German footballer. He spent three seasons with Eintracht Braunschweig in the Bundesliga, as well as one season in the 2. Bundesliga.
