= Business- and Agricultural Bank of Jutland =

Coordinates: 56.157793°N 10.206904°E

- Jydsk Handels- og Landbrugsbank
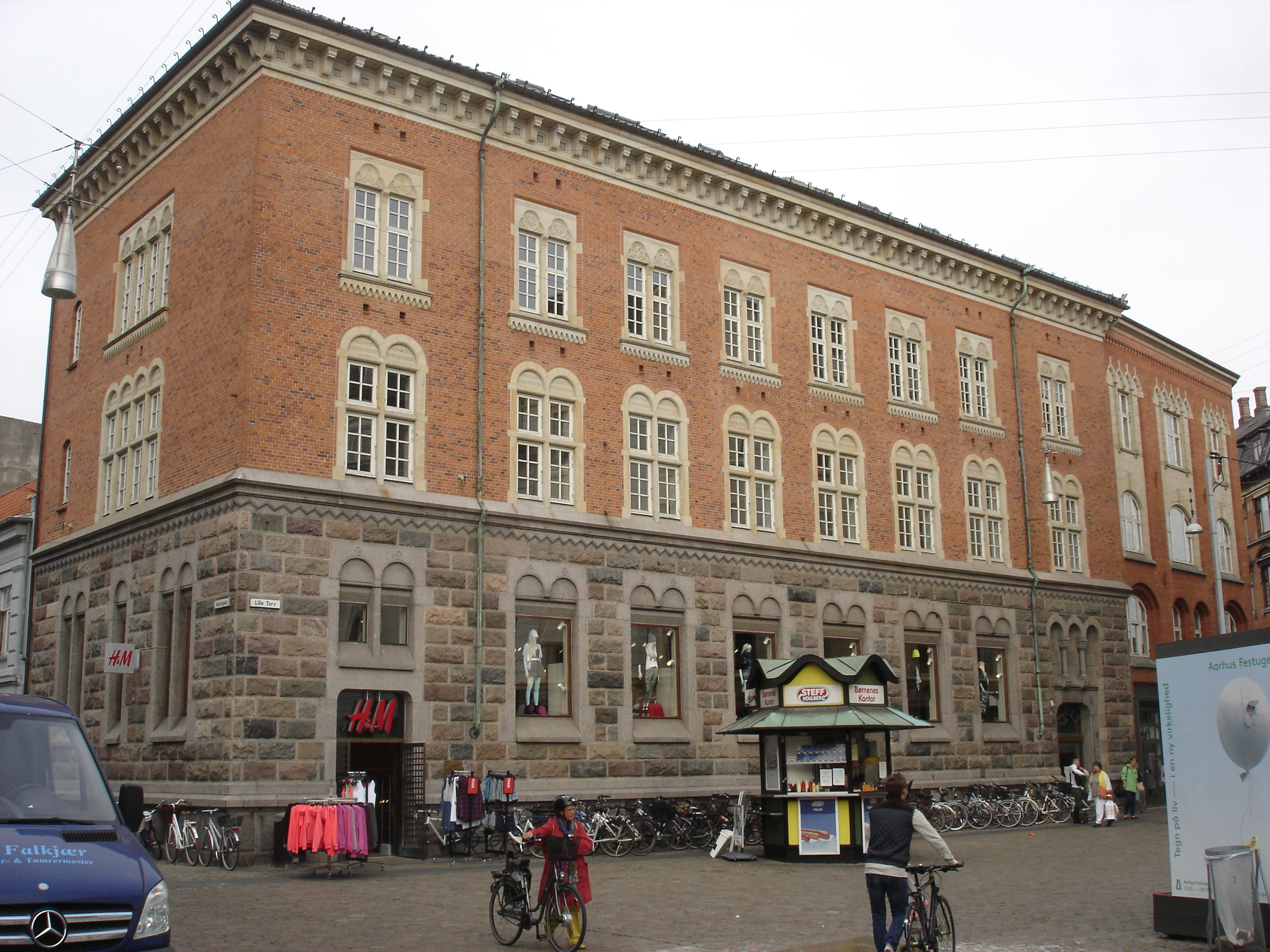
- Main façade of the Business- and Agricultural Bank
- Interactive map of the Business- and Agricultural Bank of Jutland area

General information
- Architectural style: National romantic Italian Renaissance revival
- Location: Aarhus, Denmark
- Construction started: 1899
- Completed: 1900

Design and construction
- Architect: Sophus Frederik Kühnel

Business- and Agricultural Bank of Jutland (Danish: Jydsk Handels- og Landbrugsbank) is a listed building and a former Danish bank in Aarhus.

== History ==
In 1870 the firm D.B. Adler & Co., based in Copenhagen acquired the business and bank company Adler, Wulff & Meyer, based in Aarhus. The new company was turned into a Kommanditselskab structure and in October 1874 the Jydsk Handels- og Landbrugsbank A/S company was formed with Christian Ludvig Kier as president until 1876 when it became a subsidiary of the Copenhagen Business Bank, under its own name for many years, effectively functioning as a branch. From 1921 NIels Jensen became director of the branch and later the assistant director of Copenhagen Business Bank in 1934 and the vice-president in 1948.

In 1944 the branch was moved to Rådhuspladsen and in 1990 the Copenhagen Business Bank, Danske Bank and Provinsbanken merged to form Danske Bank. The logo of the Copenhagen Business Bank was in use until the year of 2000 but the name and logo of Jydsk Handels- og Landbrugsbank was decommissioned.

== Architecture ==
Jydsk Handels- og Landbrugsbank was situated on Lille Torv in Aarhus, in a building drawn by architect Sophus Frederik Kühnel, constructed in 1899–1900 and listed in 1996 by the Danish Heritage Agency. The building is mainly inspired by Italian renaissance architecture with elements of the national romantic style.

The building is in 3 floors and sits on an inwardly leaning base of quarried granite ashlar topped with a bright profile strip. The outer walls of the ground floor is also granite ashlar but in different colors while red bricks are used on the upper floors and the low roof. The ashlar and brick sections are broken by a cornice and the brick section is topped with a heavy corbel cornice. The windows are framed in sandstone with twin arches above and rope ornaments on the sills below. The roof is half-hipped and topped with glazed tile. The interior features a marble stairwell with wrought iron railing and patterned masonry.

The building remains close to original condition with the only major change being a new the window towards Vestergade being changed to a door when a shop moved in, in 2008, and ground floor windows having been replaced. The walls, columns, vaults, panels and decorations are generally intact and original.
