= Walther Neye =

German lawyer and university rector (1901–1989)

- Born: Walther Eduard Hermann Neye; 24 July 1901; Arnsberg, Westphalia, Germany
- Died: 12 August 1989; Berlin, East Germany
- Occupations: Lawyer / Notary; University rector
- Political party: NSDAP (1933); SED (1963)

Walther Neye (24 July 1901 – 12 August 1989) was a German lawyer. Between 1952 and 1957 he was the rector of Berlin's Humboldt University.

== Life ==
=== Early years ===
Walther Eduard Hermann Neye was born, the youngest of three children, at the start of the twentieth century in Arnsberg, a prosperous mid-sized town in central western Germany. His father was a company secretary. Neye successfully completed his school leaving exams in Potsdam in 1919. After that, during the confused year of political and social turbulence that for Germany followed national defeat in the First World War, he briefly joined the "Upper Silesian Border Force" (Grenzschutz Oberschlesien), a freelance quasi-military body set up by the Council of the People's Deputies (interim government) to guard Germany's south-eastern border with the newly re-created Polish state in a region where many districts were of mixed ethnicity and national identity.

In autumn 1919 he returned to Berlin and started a period of legal study at the Frederick William University (as the Humboldt was then known), graduating successfully in 1923. In 1924, he received his doctorate from Breslau University, obtaining in 1927 a referendary post through passing a further public examination. During his time as a referendary, which lasted until 1935, he also worked as a repetitor.

=== Professional life before and during the war ===
In 1928 Neye started to work as a lawyer in Berlin. Five years later, in January 1933, there was a change of regime. The Hitler government lost little time in switching Germany over to single-party dictatorship. Shortly after that, in May 1933, Walther Neye signed up for party membership, also joining the National Socialist Association of Legal Professionals. In June 1938 he was nominated as a notary to the Charlottenburg (Berlin) District Court. In summer 1938 Neye faced official censure from the legal regulator because he had sold a piece of land to a Jewish woman, which was by now contrary to government policy. The record of the incident was retained in the files kept by the president of the district court. Despite this, from 1939 the assessments kept about him on file by the district court president were very positive.

War returned towards the end of 1939. Neye entered into a contract with the Aviation Ministry, after which he worked as a consultant in the aviation sector. However, from October 1941 until November 1942 he also resumed his work as a public notary. In November 1942 he was ordered to the Netherlands, which by this time had been under German occupation for more than two years. He was installed in Eindhoven where he was inserted into the management team controlling physical assets of the important Philips electronics corporation that the family had not managed to move across the Atlantic ahead of the German invasion. In September 1944 he was removed from Philips when Einhoven was liberated from German forces by allied forces.

=== After the war ===
War ended in May 1945, with the eastern part of Berlin now incorporated into the Soviet occupation zone in what remained of Germany. Neye managed to persuade the magistrate of greater Berlin that he had never been a member of the Nazi Party and in June 1945 was readmitted to the legal profession in the city. In July 1945 he resumed his office as public notary, with which he continued until 1947.

At the end of summer 1946 Neye also took a teaching post in civil law at the Humboldt University. As part of the recruitment process, he had been required to provide a sworn statement that he had not been a party member, and had always been critical of the Hitler regime. For the Dean of the Law faculty, Hans Peters, Neye's experience as a repetitor during the early 1930s, counted decisively in favour of his appointment. Sources stress that Neye's mid-career switch into the academic world was facilitated by a desperate shortage of academic staff generated by the slaughter of war and, at least in the case of the law faculty at the Humboldt, exacerbated in the zone under Soviet administration by rigorous de-nazification processes that excluded many potential candidates. Neye was therefore able to become a full professor at the university without ever obtaining a higher habilitation qualification.

After October 1949, when the Soviet occupation zone was reinvented as the German Democratic Republic, an unusual and increasingly apparent feature of the new country's political structure was the extent to which political and administrative control was centrally directed. An early manifestation of this trend in the education sector was the creation, in 1945, of the [[:de:Deutsche Verwaltung für Volksbildung|German National People's Training Administration (DVV / Deutsche Verwaltung für Volksbildung)]]. In 1947 this body nominated Neye to a full professorship of civil law at the University of Rostock. In Berlin the Humboldt made him an equivalent appointment, still without any requirement to obtain a habilitation qualification. A tussle between the two universities ensued, and lasted several months. It was only in March 1948 that the DVV informed Rostock that they had decided that Neye should remain in Berlin, and his appointment to a professorship eventually took place in July 1948. The in October 1948 the DVV president, Paul Wandel appointed him Full Professor in Civil Law at the Humboldt. The struggle with Rostock University over the appointment continued to fester, however.

During the 1950s Neye remained quietly but determinedly apolitical: his career success within the education sector is attributed to his exceptional talent for organisation. In 1950 he was appointed Dean of the Law Faculty at the Humboldt University. Two years later, in 1952, he started a five-year stint as the University Rector, in succession to Walter Friedrich. In 1952 he also joined the National Peace Council. Finally, in 1963, he joined the ruling Socialist Unity Party (SED). In May 1963 he was appointed to head up the East German Commission for UNESCO work.

== Awards and honours ==
- 1954 Patriotic Order of Merit
- 1960 Patriotic Order of Merit in Gold

Like many of East Germany's elite artists and academics, Neye lived in the prestigious Street 201 quarter of Pankow on Berlin's northside.
