= Sophus Frederik Kühnel =

Danish architect

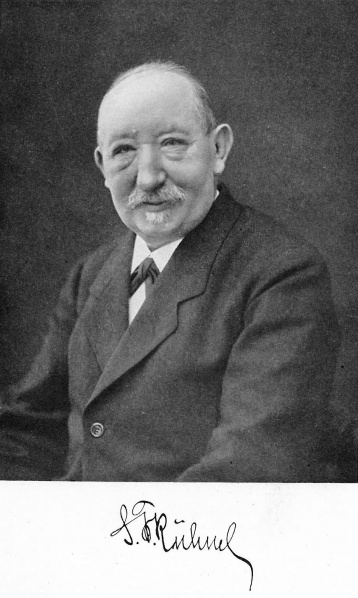
- Sophus Frederik Kühnel, c. 1911
- Born: 11 May 1851; Sæby, Denmark
- Died: 13 October 1930 (aged 79); Aarhus, Denmark
- Education: Royal Danish Academy of Fine Arts
- Occupation: Architect
- Buildings: Mejlborg; Business- and Agricultural Bank of Jutland
- Projects: The Old Town

Sophus Frederik Kühnel (11 May 1851 – 13 October 1930) was a Danish architect best known for his design of Mejlborg and a number of other buildings in Aarhus.

== Biography ==
Kühnel was born in Sæby, Denmark. He was the son of parish priest Theodor Sextus Kühnel and Betzy Larsen. He moved to Copenhagen to study at the Royal Danish Academy of Fine Arts. Upon graduation he found employment with Vilhelm Dahlerup and Ferdinand Meldahl in Copenhagen. In the 1880s Kühnel moved to Aarhus to work as inspector for Vilhelm Theodor Walther on the restoration of Aarhus Cathedral.

Kühnel stayed in Aarhus and was responsible for a number of notable structures there. His work is historicist often inspired by Renaissance and Gothic Architecture. The Business- and Agricultural Bank of Jutland building utilizes a style inspired by Italian architecture and the richly decorated Mejlborg is a mix of Gothic and Renaissance architecture.

Kühnel worked on the National Exhibition of 1909 where he helped move an old building from 1596 to the historic section of the exhibit. The old buildings displayed there became the later Old Town Museum partly on the initiative of Kühnel. He worked for the museum for many years and orchestrated the relocation of several old buildings to the museum.

== Selected works ==
- Ny Munkegade's School (1894)
- Langelandsgade Barracks (1889)
- Mejlborg (1898)
- Business- and Agricultural Bank of Jutland (1900)
- Kasino-Teatret (1900)
- Aarhus Fire Station (1904)
- Villa Alba (1904), Chr. Filtenborgs Plads
