= Neye (company) =

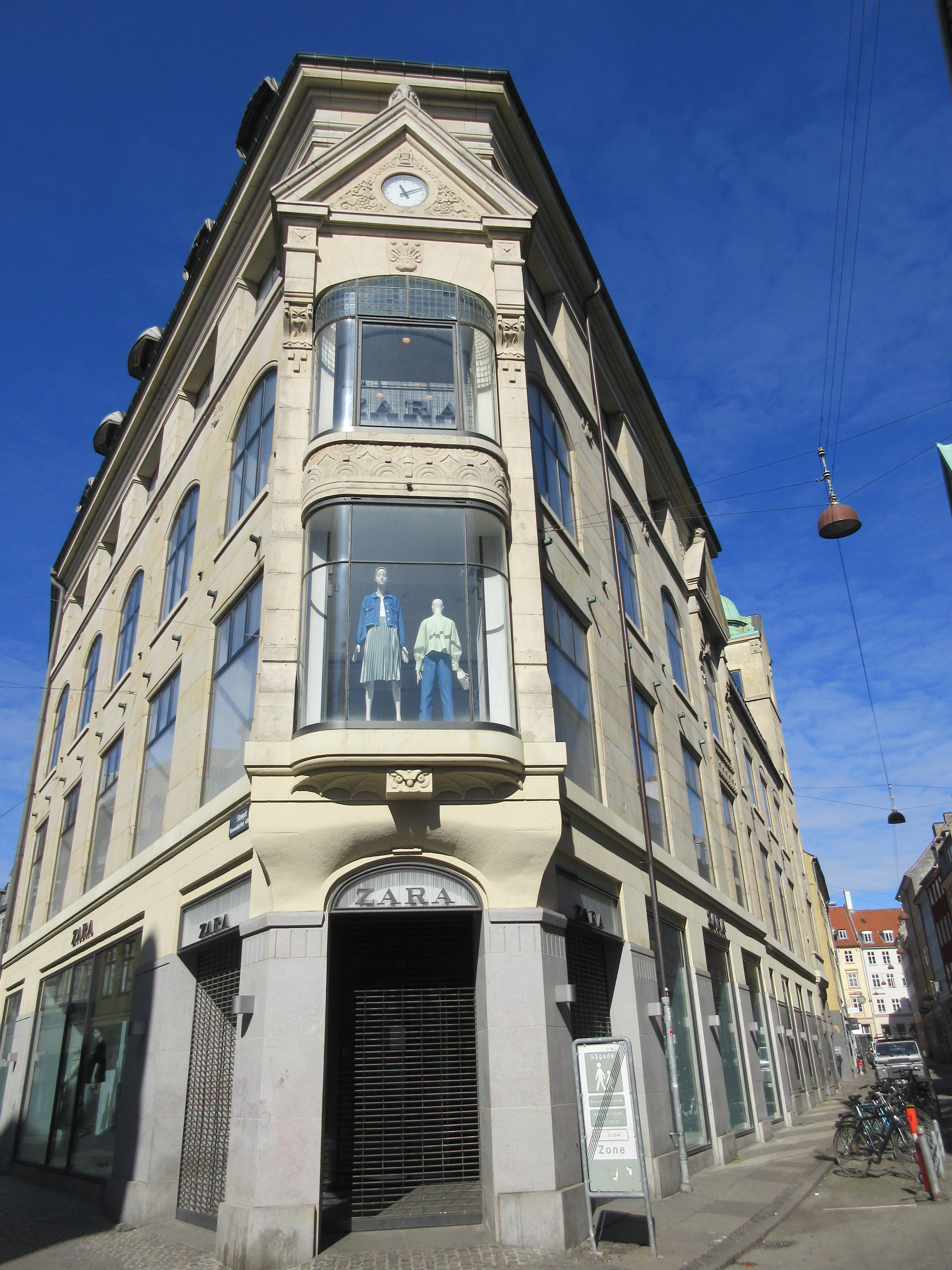
The Neye Building on Strøget in Copenhagen

Neye, formerly Johannes Neye is a luggage manufacturer and retailer based in Copenhagen, Denmark. The company currently operates 40 retail locations selling product assortments from its own brand as well as a wide range of international brands.

== History ==
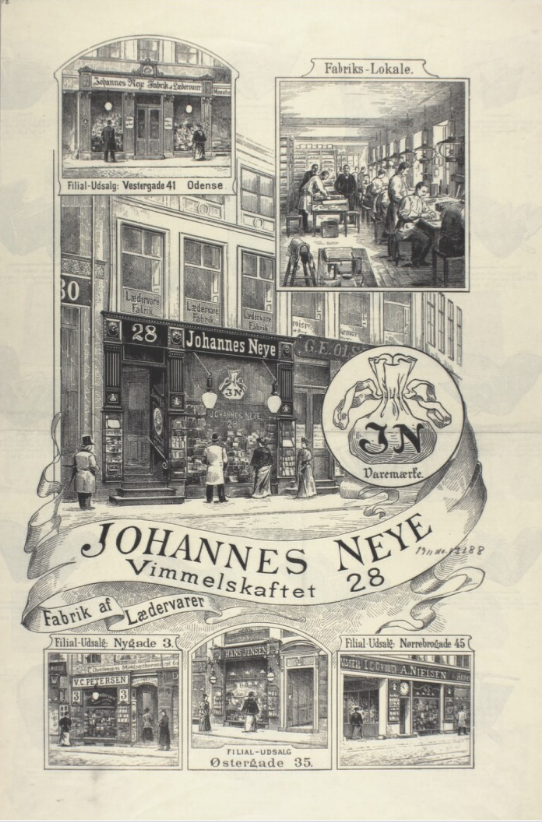
An advert for the company featuring its building at Vimmelskaftet 28 in Copenhagen

The company was founded when Johannes Neye opened a "galantry shop" at Vimmelskaftet 28 in 1881. He opened his second shop at Nygade 3 just half a year later. The company started its own production of leather products in 1891. Over the years, it acquired the entire building at No. 27, the adjacent corner building (No. 30) and two more buildings in Klosterstræde. All four buildings were replaced by a new building designed by Philip Smidth in 1915.

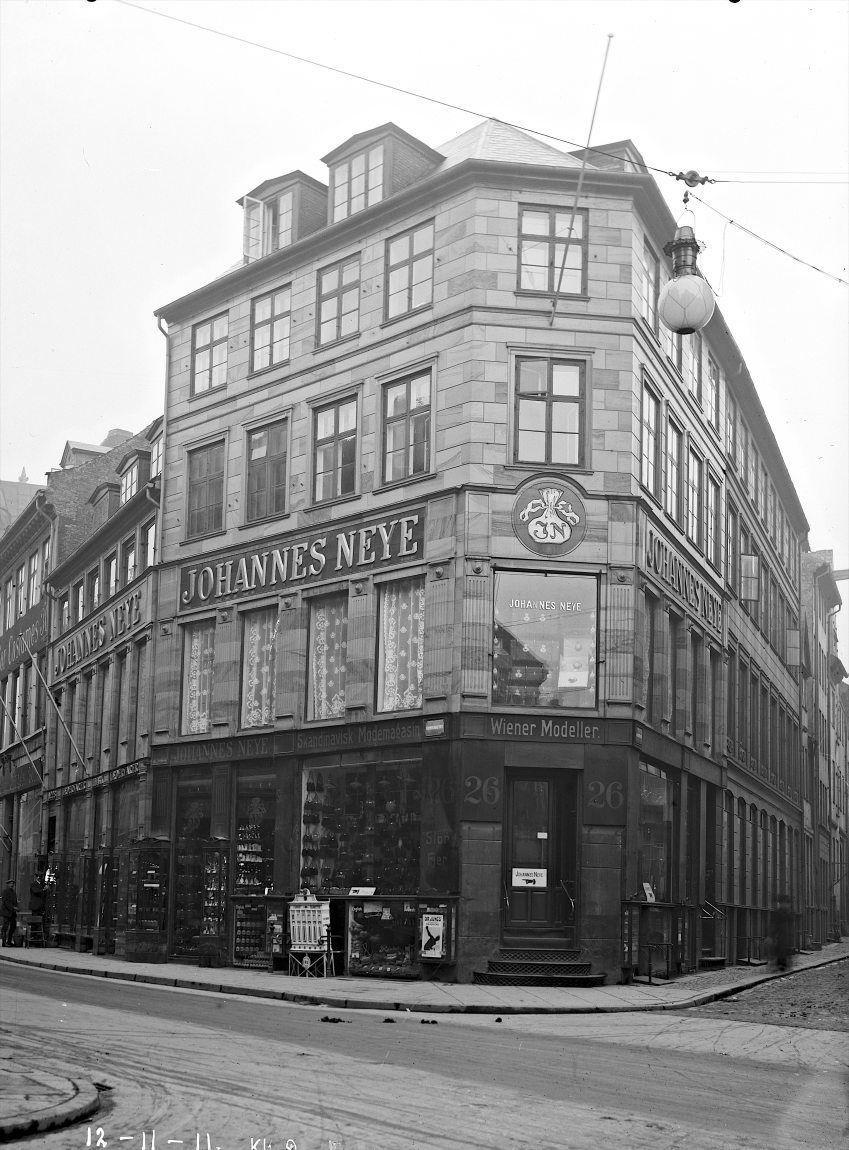
The Vimmelskaftet building in 1911

The company was after Johannes Neye's death on 5 January 1926 continued by his son Knud Neye. The company had by then grown to seven retail locations and a leather workshop in Klosterstræde. The corner building at No. 30 was replaced by a new building in 1930–31.

Knud Neye died just 59 years old from cancer on 11 February 1945. The company was after that continued by his widow Agnete Neye. The couple had no children and she therefore chose to leave the company as well as her personal wealth to a foundation, Neye Fonden, which supports research in cancer and other deceases. Agnete Neye died on 29 January 1980.

The company closed its historic flagship shop at Vimmelskaftet 30 in 2017. It launched a new online platform in November that same year.

== Products ==
Neye Since 1881 by Cecilie Toklum, a collection of bags designed by Cecilie Talkum with inspiration from historic designs from the company's archives, was launched in October 2015.
