= Mejlborg =

Coordinates: 56.1621°N 10.2155°E

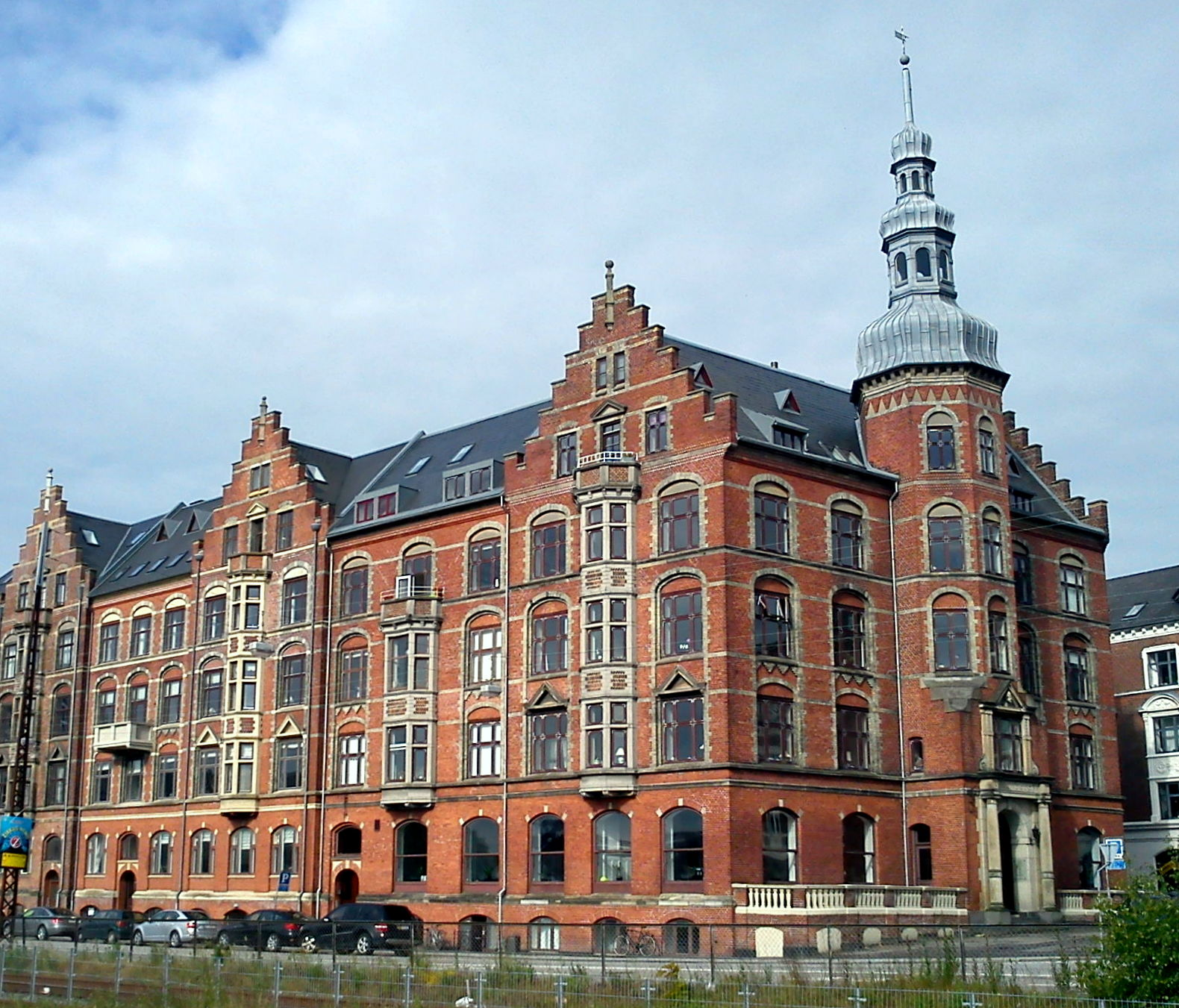
- Interactive map of the Mejlborg area

General information
- Architectural style: Historicist
- Location: Aarhus, Denmark
- Construction started: 1896
- Completed: 1898

Technical details
- Floor count: 5

Mejlborg is a residential building in Aarhus, Denmark. The building is situated in the Nørre Stenbro neighborhood on Kystvejen 59-65 and Mejlgade 92 in the city center. It was the first large, privately built apartment complex in the city and a social hub for the upper class in the early 20th century. Mejlborg is named for the adjacent Mejlgade street. "Mejl" is derived from the old-Danish word for middle and "borg" means castle making Mejlborg the middle-castle or the castle in the middle.

== History ==
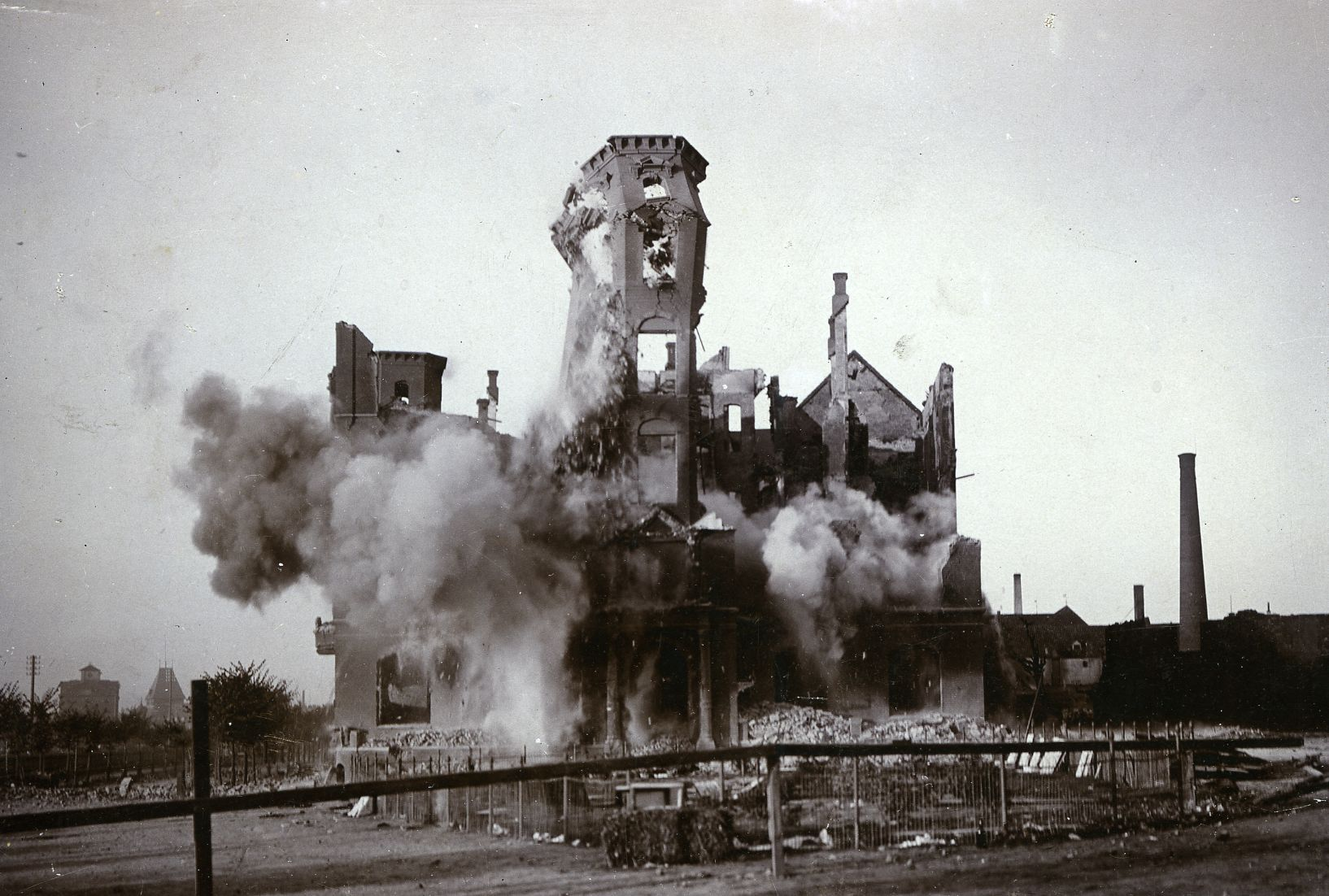
The ruins of the first Mejlborg under artillery fire after the fire that burned it down in 1897.

Mejlborg was built in 1896-98 by drawings of architect Sophus Frederik Kühnel. It was built on the site of the former Mejlgade city gate where the city walls had marked the limit of the city prior to 1871. Mejlborg was the first building of its size in the city and it towered above the nearby merchants houses in the nearby Latin Quarter. Mejlborg was designed with expansive apartments on the east side facing Kystvejen with a commanding view of the Bay of Aarhus. The ground floor had a fashionable restaurant initially operated by the restaurateur Christian Madsen.

In 1899 a fire broke out in a sawmill in Mejlgade and the fire razed 14 buildings in the north end of the street, including Mejlborg, left with only its outer shell standing. Aarhus was at the time home to an artillery regiment housed in Langelandsgade Barracks and the soldiers subsequently used the ruins for target practice in a questionable bid to safely pull down the remains of the building.

Mejlborg was rebuilt the same year of the fire and was completed in an almost identical form. The restaurant was re-established with a new owner and functioned until 1960 when it closed. Mejlborg functioned as a hotel for a brief period in the early 20th century but never with much success. Today Mejlborg only has residential units apart from the former restaurant on the ground floor which is used for offices.

== Architecture ==
The building is characterized by a historicist Gothic Renaissance style with richly decorated facades. The facade facing the coast is divided in 3 sections each with a row of 3 windows. The outermost sections protrude slightly and have large Gothic crow-stepped gables, bay windows, avant-corps and balconies. The middle section share many features but lack the gables and instead have dormer windows in the ridged roof. The main entrance is an octagonal tower topped with an onion dome with a small bell tower and spire on top of it.

== See also ==
- Listed buildings in Aarhus Municipality
