= Noah (disambiguation) =

Noah is a Biblical patriarch who built an ark to save each kind of animal from the Great Flood.

Noah may also refer to:

== Places ==
- Noah, Georgia, an unincorporated community in the United States
- Noah, Tennessee, an unincorporated community in the United States

== Name ==
- Noah (American painter) (born 1971), an American artist
- Noah (name), a given name and surname (including a list of people with this name)
- King Noah, a wicked Nephite king from the Book of Mormon who burned the prophet Abinadi at the stake
- Noah, an early Jaredite king in the Book of Mormon

== Arts, entertainment, and media ==
=== Fictional entities ===
- Noah (The Walking Dead), a character from the American television series The Walking Dead
- Noah, a character from the Canadian animated series Total Drama
- Noah, the main character of Xenoblade Chronicles 3, a 2022 action role-playing game
- Noah Beckett, a character in the American television show Second Noah
- Noah Carver, a character in the Power Rangers Megaforce
- Noah Clan ("Noah no Ichizoku"), the primary antagonists of the D.Gray-man fictional universe manga/anime
- Noah Kaiba, the boss of the Big Five in season 3 of the second series of Yu-Gi-Oh!
- Noah "Hardstep" Rivers, a character from the 1985 American drama television series Hell Town
- Ultraman Noa, the true form of Ultraman Nexus from the eponymous series

=== Films ===
- The Noah (1975), a post-apocalyptic fiction film written and directed by Daniel Bourla
- Noah (1998 film), a 1998 TV film directed by Ken Kwapis
- Noah (2013 film), a 2013 Canadian short film directed by Walter Woodman and Patrick Cederberg
- Noah (2014 film), a 2014 epic biblical drama film directed by Darren Aronofsky

=== Music ===
- Noah (band), an Indonesian band
- Noah (duo), a Danish musical duo
  - Noah (Noah album), the 2013 debut album of duo Noah above
- Noah (The Bob Seger System album) (1969)
- Noah (Noah Stewart album) (2012)
- Noah (soundtrack), the score album to the 2014 film of the same name
- "Noah", a song by Harry Belafonte from the album Belafonte, 1956
- "Noah", a 2017 song by Diaura from Versus
- "Noah", a 2019 song by Jinjer from Macro

=== Other arts, entertainment, and media ===
- Noah (sura), the 71st chapter of the Quran
- Noah (TV series), a 2010 Philippine TV series
- Noah, a common collective name for the three sketches about Noah by Bill Cosby from his album Bill Cosby Is a Very Funny Fellow...Right! (1963)
- Noé (Noah), a play by André Obey

== Organizations ==
- FC Noah, an Armenian professional football club based in Yerevan, Armenia
- NOAH, the Danish affiliate of Friends of the Earth Europe
- National Oceanic and Atmospheric Administration, a scientific agency from the United States
- National Office of Animal Health, a UK trade association
- National Organization for Albinism and Hypopigmentation, a non-profit organization that assists people who have albinism
- Pro Wrestling Noah, a professional wrestling promotion based in Japan

== Other uses ==
- Noah (brand), a clothing brand
- Noah (gaur), the first cloned gaur (a large bovine native to the Indian Subcontinent and Southeast Asia)
- Noah (grape), a wine grape
- NOAH, an acronym for naturally occurring affordable housing
- Project NOAH (Philippines), a national disaster risk reduction program and mobile application in the Philippines
- Toyota Noah, a vehicle model

== See also ==
- Noa (disambiguation)
- Noach (parsha), a parshah or portion in the annual Jewish cycle of Torah reading
- Noahidism, a monotheistic Jewish religious movement
- NOHA (disambiguation)
