= NOHA =

Noha is a form of Arabic poetry, a lament for the death of Husayn ibn Ali in the Battle of Karbala.

Noha or NOHA may also refer to:

- Northern Ontario Hockey Association, ice hockey organisation in Canada
- NOHA (academic organisation), Network on Humanitarian Action, international group of universities
- Nominal Ocular Hazard Area in laser safety
- N-hydroxy-L-arginine (NOHA)
- N-Hydroxyamphetamine (NOHA)

== People with the surname ==
- Mike Noha U.S. soccer forward

== People with the given name ==
- Noha Yossry (1992) Egyptian table tennis player
- Noha Radwan assistant professor of Arabic and comparative literature at the University of California, Davis
- Noha Abd Rabo (1987) Egyptian taekwondo fighter

== See also ==
- Noah (disambiguation)
