= Noa =

Noa or NOA may refer to:

== People ==
- Noa (name)
- Noa (Amuse singer) (born 2000), Japanese singer associated with Amuse
- Noa (Israeli singer), Israeli singer
- Noa (MR8 singer) (born 2000), Japanese singer associated with MR8
- Noa (No Doubt Tracks singer), Japanese singer associated with No Doubt Tracks
- Noa, one of the five daughters of Zelophehad (her name is spelled "Noah" in some Bible translations)

=== Fictional ===
- Noa (dog), a dog in Inubaka: Crazy for Dogs
- Ultraman Noa
- Nōa, a character from Fullmetal Alchemist the Movie: Conqueror of Shamballa

== Places ==
- North Ossetia-Alania, a federal subject (republic) of Russia country
- HMAS Albatross (air station), IATA airport code "NOA"
- Noa Lake, a small lake at the head of the Dusen Fjord

== Other uses ==
- .noa, a rare file extension that was used for some Japanese eroge games around 2002
- Noa (band), a 1980s French Zeuhl group
- Noa (Polynesian culture), a Māori term referring to the opposite of Tapu ("taboo")
- National Observatory of Athens
- National Opera Association, United States
- National Outsourcing Association, former name of the Global Sourcing Association, a trade association in the United Kingdom
- The Natural Ontological Attitude, a philosophy of science proposed by Arthur Fine
- Naturally occurring asbestos
- Navigate on Autopilot
- Net operating assets
- Nintendo of America
- Nintendo of Australia
- Olympic Air's former ICAO airline designator
- Team NoA, a professional e-sports team
- USS Noa (DD-841), US Navy destroyer

== See also ==
- Noah (disambiguation)
- NOAA
