= Troels Gustavsen =

Danish singer

Troels Gustavsen from Sakskøbing, Denmark, born in 1988 is a Danish singer/songwriter who released his first studio album titled Soon in March 2007 on the indie label "NoobFactory" and on "A:larm Music" (for distribution). It included his single "Time (Blue Signs)", a personal song about the loss of his father 2 years earlier. Other songs in Soon included "Christopher", "Hey Dreamer" and "Dried Out".

== In Noah ==
In 2011, he carved a partnership with Lasse Dyrholm to form the duo Noah (duo). The duo had chart success with their first single (released in January 2012) "Alt er forbi" that reached #14 on Tracklisten, the official Danish Singles Chart. The follow-up single "Over byen" reached #8. The duo is planning on releasing a full studio album in 2013.

== Discography ==
For Troels Gustavsen's discography as part of Noah, see Noah (duo)

=== Albums ===
2007: Soon

Track list:

1. "Dreamer (3:03)
2. "Times (Blue Signs)" (3:41)
3. "Let's Get Surprised" (3:39)
4. "Soon" (3:34)
5. "Christopher" (3:46)
6. "River" (3:27)
7. "Dried Out" (3:49)
8. "Adam Lost His Eve" (2:57)
9. "Easy Come, Easy Go" (3:15)
10. "Gently" (3:38)
11. "This Is Who I Am" (3:35)
12. "Shape of Destiny" (2:40)

=== Singles ===
- 2007: "Times (Blue Signs)"
