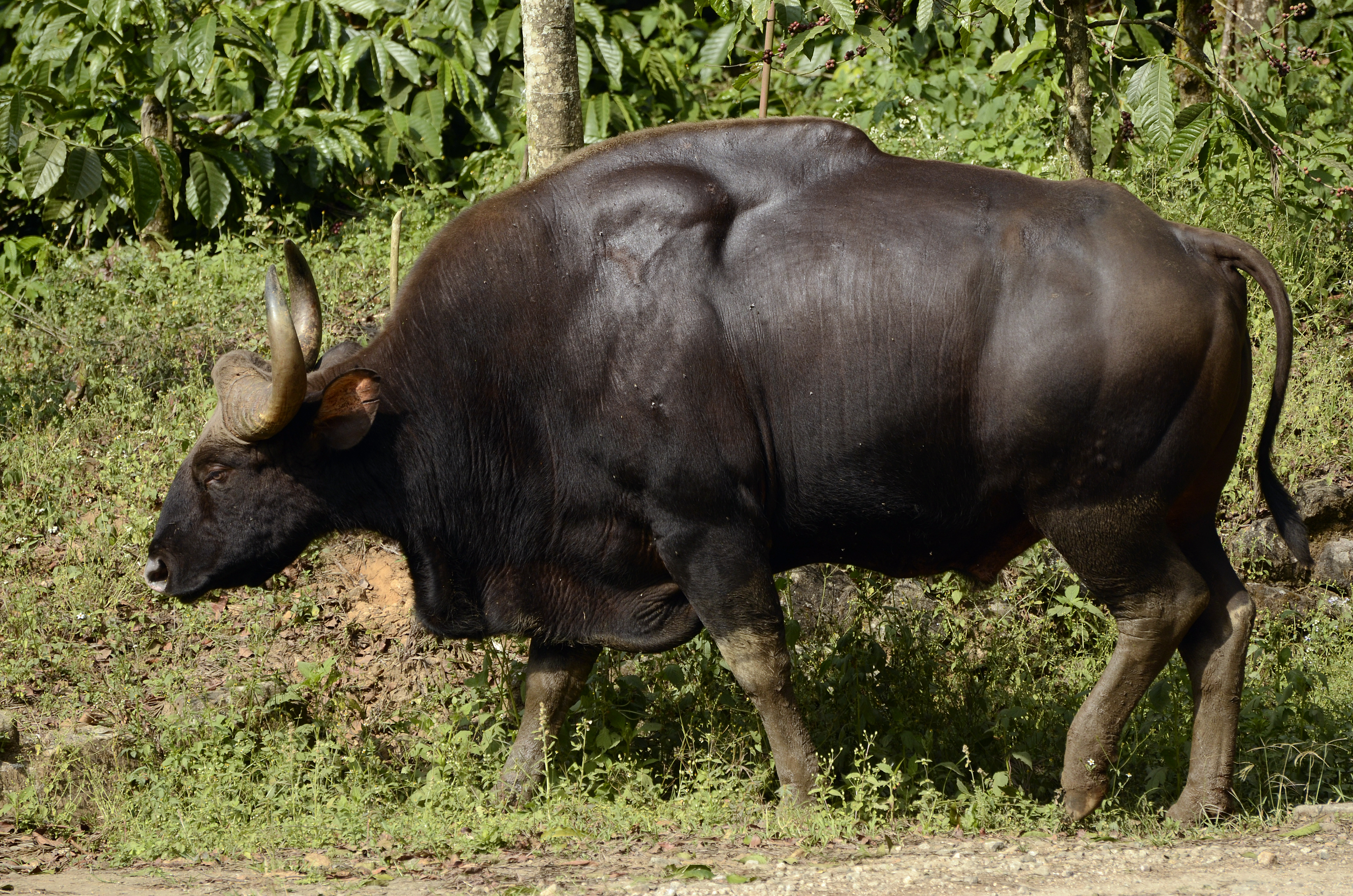
- Bull
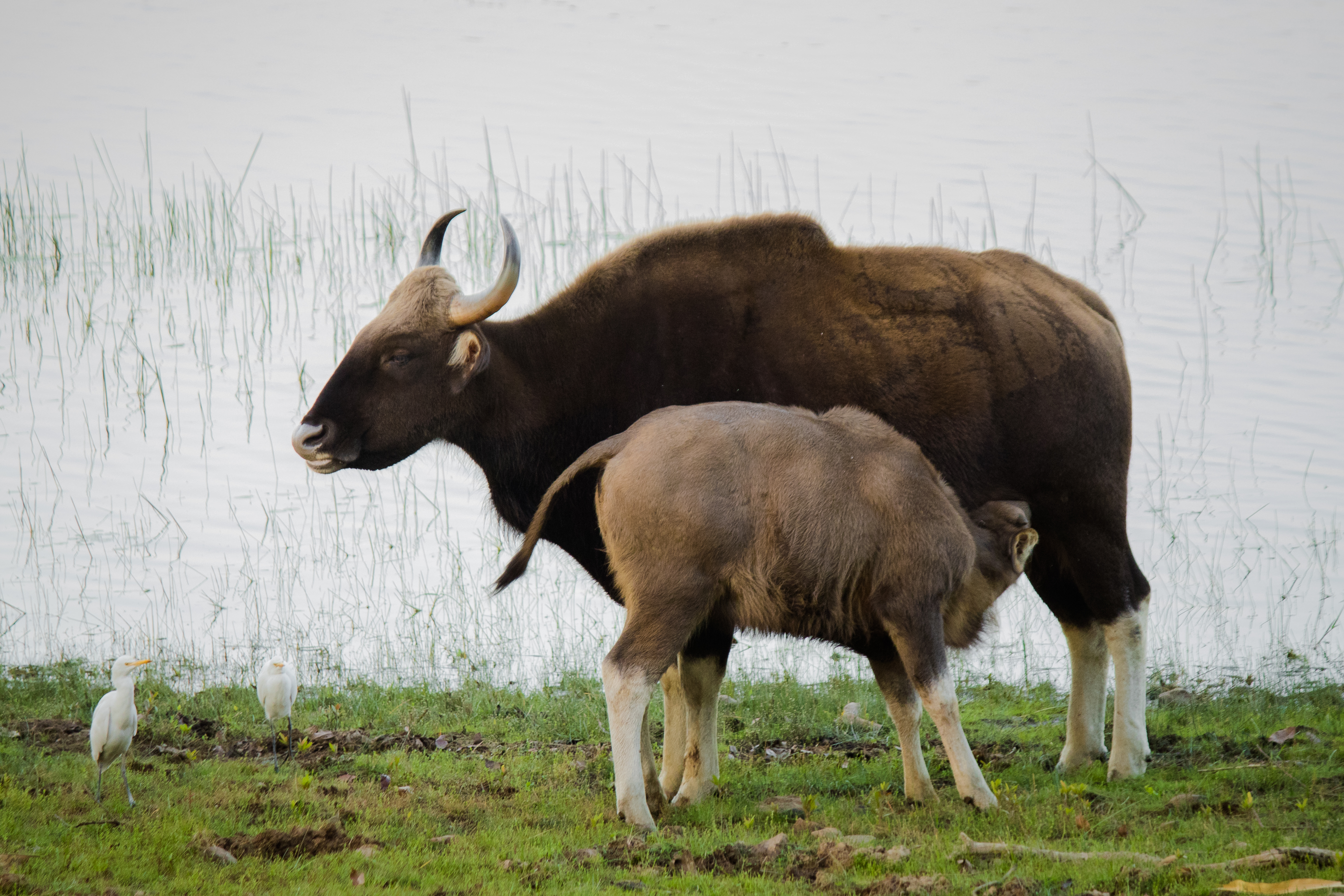
- Cow and calf

Conservation status
- Vulnerable (IUCN 3.1)
- CITES Appendix I

Scientific classification
- Kingdom: Animalia
- Phylum: Chordata
- Class: Mammalia
- Order: Artiodactyla
- Family: Bovidae
- Subfamily: Bovinae
- Genus: Bos
- Species: B. gaurus

Binomial name
- Bos gaurus (Smith, 1827)
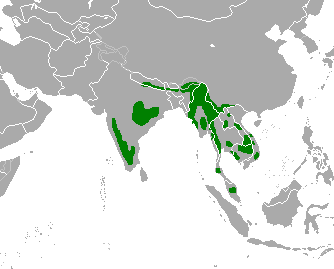
- Present range

= Gaur =

Gaur Temporal range: Middle Pleistocene–Present

Largest species of the bovid family

The gaur (Bos gaurus; /ɡaʊər/), also known as the Indian bison, is a large bovine native to the Indian subcontinent and Southeast Asia, and has been listed as Vulnerable on the IUCN Red List since 1986. The global population was estimated at a maximum of 21,000 mature individuals in 2016, with the majority of those existing in India. It is the largest species among the wild cattle and the Bovidae.

The domesticated gayal or mithun originated partly from the wild gaur and is most common in the border regions of Northeast India (Assam, Manipur, Nagaland) and Bangladesh with Myanmar and Yunnan, China.

== Etymology ==
The Sanskrit word गौर gaura means 'white, yellowish, reddish'. The Sanskrit word gaur-mriga means a kind of water buffalo.

The Hindi word गौर gaur means 'fair-skinned, fair, white'.

== Taxonomy ==
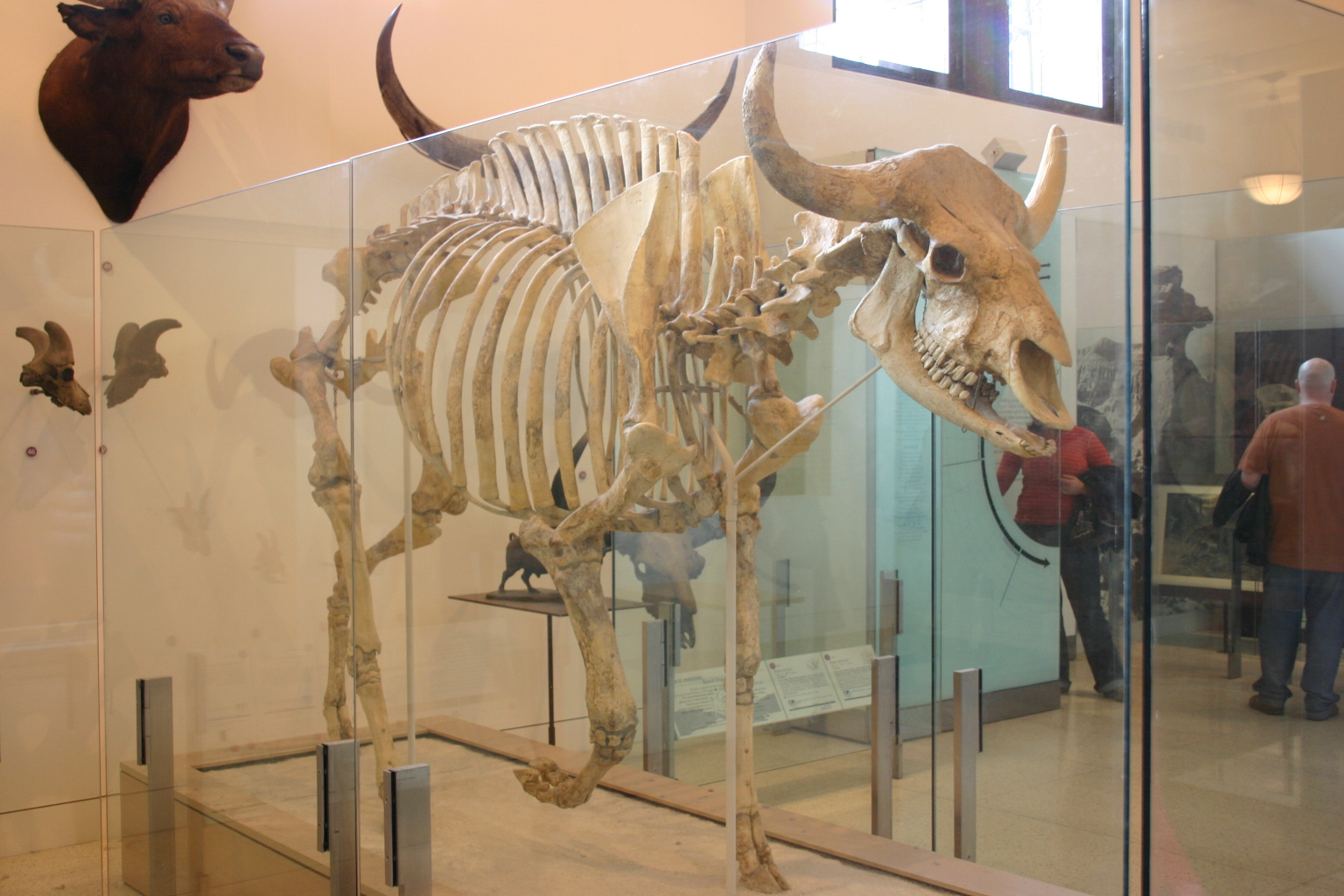
Bos gaurus grangeri skeleton

Bison gaurus was the scientific name proposed by Charles Hamilton Smith in 1827. Later authors subordinated the species under either Bos or Bibos.

To date, three gaur subspecies have been recognized:

- B. g. gaurus; the nominate subspecies, ranges in India, Nepal and Bhutan.
- B. g. readei; described by Richard Lydekker in 1903, based on a specimen from Myanmar, and is thought to range from Upper Myanmar to Tanintharyi Region.
- B. g. hubbacki; described by Lydekker in 1907, based on a specimen from Pahang in Peninsular Malaysia. It was thought to range from Peninsular Malaysia and northward through Tenasserim. This classification, based largely on differences in coloration and size, is no longer widely recognized.

In 2003, the International Commission on Zoological Nomenclature fixed the valid specific name of the wild gaur as the first available name based on the wild population, despite being antedated by the name for the domestic form. Most authors have adopted the binomial Bos gaurus for the wild species as valid for the taxon.

In recognition of phenotypic differences between zoological specimens of Indian and Southeast Asian gaur, the trinomials Bos gaurus gaurus and Bos gaurus laosiensis are provisionally accepted, pending further morphometric and genetic study.

Within the genus Bos, the gaur is most closely related to the banteng (Bos javanicus) and the probably now extinct kouprey (Bos sauveli), which are also native to Southeast Asia. Relationships of members of the genus Bos based on nuclear genomes after Sinding, et al. 2021.

- Bos
  - Bos primigenius + Bos taurus (aurochs and cattle)
  - - - Bos mutus (wild yak)
      - - Bison bison (American bison)
        - Bison bonasus (European bison/wisent)
    - - Bos javanicus (banteng)
      - Bos gaurus (gaur)
      - Bos sauveli (kouprey)

== Characteristics ==
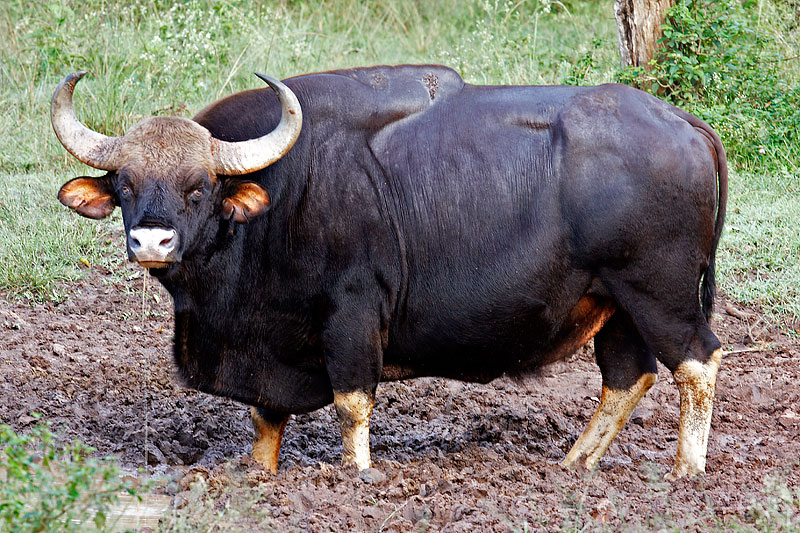
Gaur bull

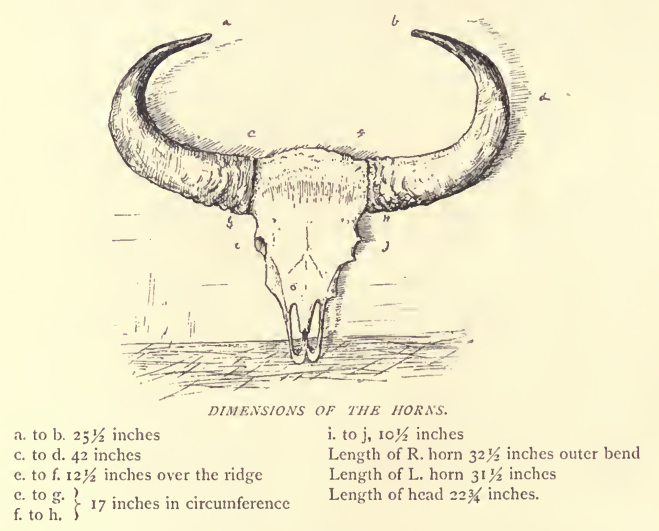
Dimensions of the horns

The gaur is the largest living bovid. It is a strong and massively built bovine with a high convex ridge on the forehead between the horns that protrudes anteriorly, causing a deep hollow in the profile of the upper part of the head. There is a prominent ridge on the back. The ears are very large. In old bulls, the hair becomes very thin on the back. The adult male is dark brown, approaching black in very old individuals. The upper part of the head, from above the eyes to the nape of the neck, is ashy grey or occasionally dirty white. The muzzle is pale coloured, and the lower part of the legs is pure white or tan. Cows and young bulls are paler and in some instances have a rufous tinge, which is most marked in groups inhabiting dry and open areas. The tail is shorter than in typical oxen, reaching only to the hocks. They have a distinct ridge running from the shoulders to the middle of the back; the shoulders may be as much as 12 cm (4.7 in) higher than the rump. This ridge is caused by the great length of the spinous processes of the vertebrae of the fore-part of the trunk as compared with those of the loins. The hair is short, fine and glossy; the hooves are narrow and pointed.

The gaur has a distinct dewlap on the throat and chest. Both sexes have horns, which grow from the sides of the head, curving upwards. Between the horns is a high convex ridge on the forehead. At their bases the horns present an elliptical cross-section, a characteristic that is more strongly marked in bulls than in cows. They are decidedly flattened at the base and regularly curved throughout their length, and are bent inward and slightly backward at their tips. The colour of the horns is pale green or yellow throughout the greater part of their length, but the tips are black. The horns, of medium size by large bovid standards, grow to a length of 60 to 115 cm (24 to 45 in). The cow is considerably lighter in colour than the bull. Cows' horns are more slender and upright with more inward curvature and a frontal ridge that is scarcely perceptible. In young animals the horns are smooth and polished, while in old bulls they are rugged and dented at the base.

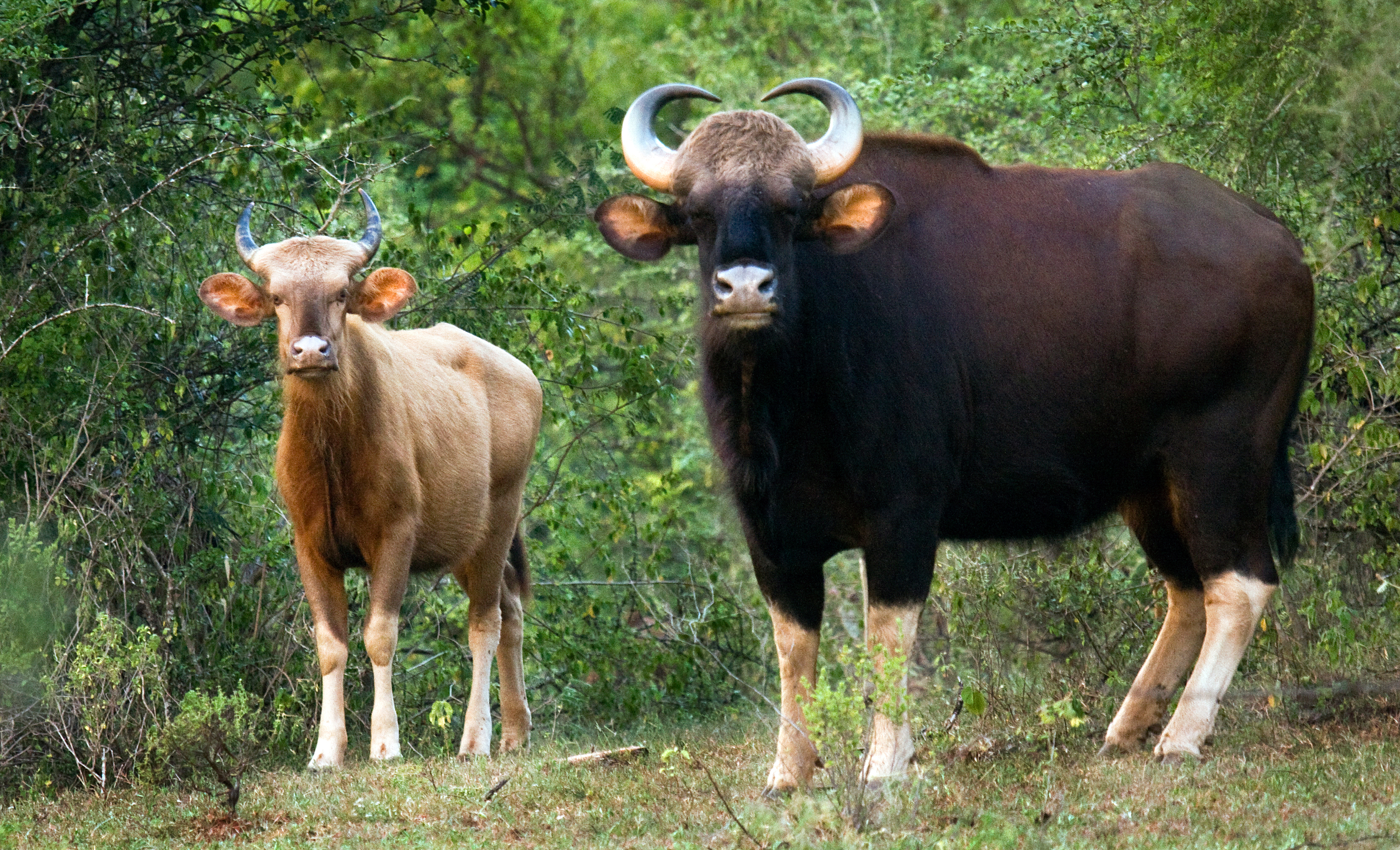
Albino gaur or Manjampatti white bison in Chinnar Wildlife Sanctuary, Kerala

The gaur has a head-and-body length of 250 to 330 cm (98 to 130 in) with a 70 to 105 cm (28 to 41 in) long tail and is 142 to 220 cm (56 to 87 in) high at the shoulder, averaging about 168 cm (66 in) in females and 188 cm (74 in) in males. At the top of its muscular hump just behind its shoulder, an average adult male is just under 200 cm (79 in) tall and the male's girth at its midsection behind the shoulders averages about 277 cm (9 ft 1 in). Males are about one-fourth larger and heavier than females. The shoulder height of the gaur in China ranges from 165 to 220 cm (65 to 87 in), and bulls weigh up to 1,500 kg (3,300 lb).

== Distribution and habitat ==
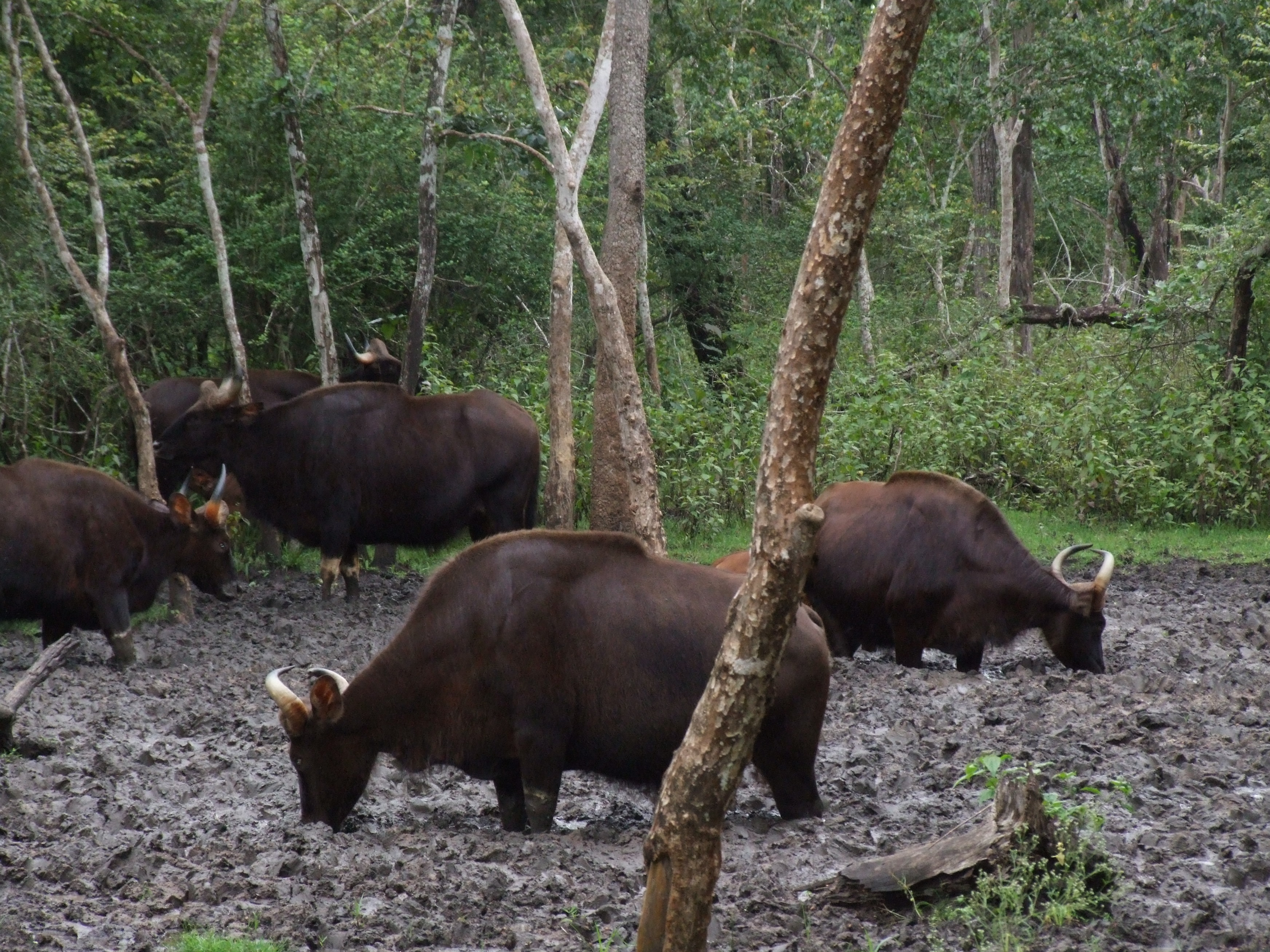
A herd at a mineral lick in Nagarhole National Park, Karnataka

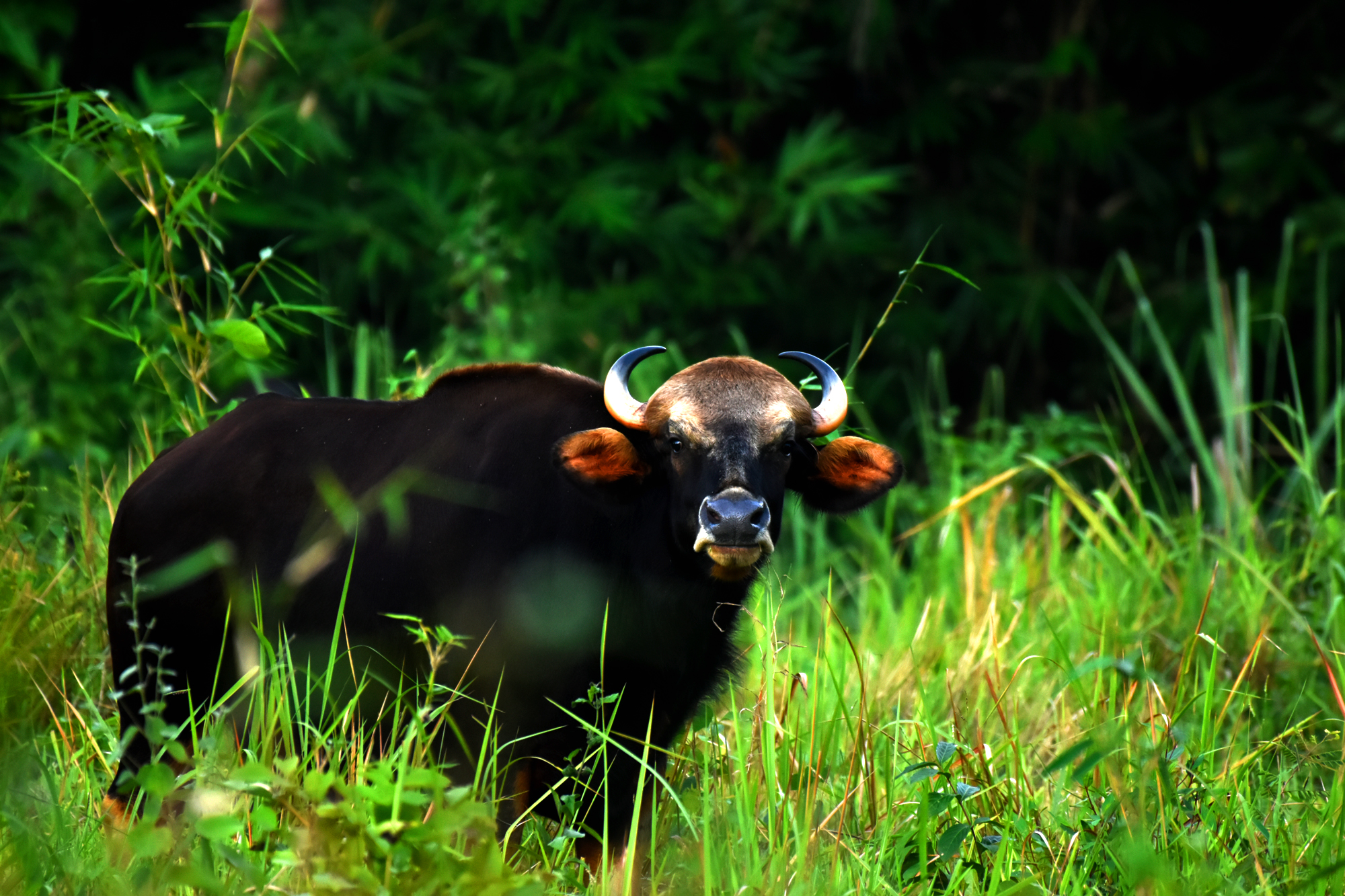
A male grazing in the grasslands of Trishna Wildlife Sanctuary, Tripura

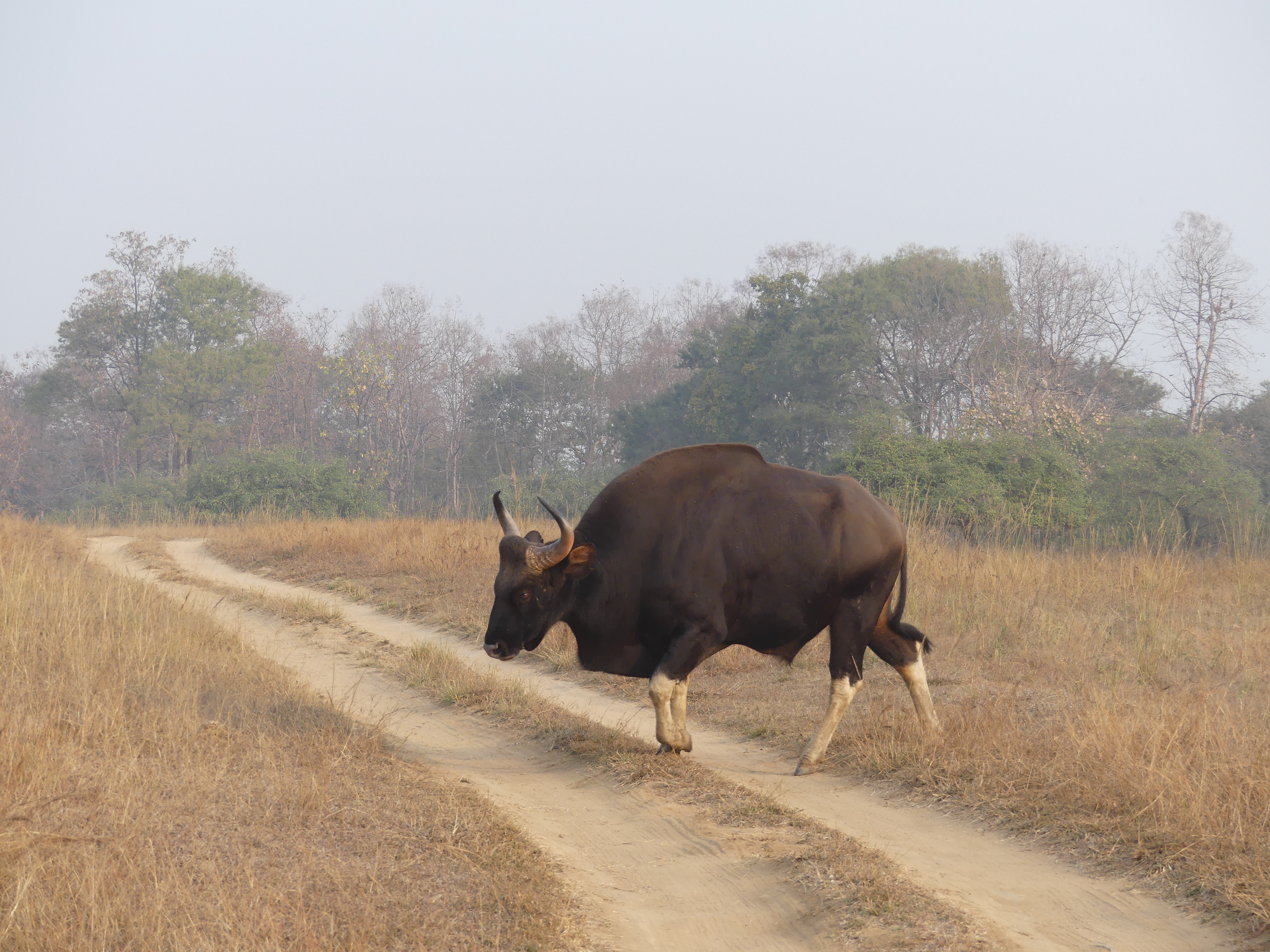
In Satpura National Park, Madhya Pradesh

The gaur historically occurred throughout mainland South and Southeast Asia, including Nepal, India, Bhutan, Bangladesh, Myanmar, Thailand, Laos, Cambodia, Vietnam and China. Today, its range is seriously fragmented, and it is regionally extinct in Peninsular Malaysia and Sri Lanka. It is largely confined to evergreen forests or semi-evergreen and moist deciduous forests, but also inhabits deciduous forest areas at the periphery. Gaur habitat is characterized by large, relatively undisturbed forest tracts, hilly terrain below an elevation of 1,500 to 1,800 m (4,900 to 5,900 ft), availability of water, and an abundance of forage in the form of grasses, bamboo, shrubs, and trees. Its apparent preference for hilly terrain may be partly due to the earlier conversion of most of the plains and other low-lying areas to croplands and pastures. It occurs from sea level to an elevation of at least 2,800 m (9,200 ft). Low-lying areas seem to comprise optimal habitat.

In Nepal, the gaur population was estimated to be 250–350 in the mid-1990s, with the majority in Chitwan National Park and the adjacent Parsa National Park. These two parks are connected by a chain of forested hills. Population trends appeared to be relatively stable. The Chitwan population has increased from 188 to 368 animals in the years 1997 to 2016. Census conducted in Parsa National Park confirmed the presence of 112 gaur in the same period.

In India, the population was estimated to be 12,000–22,000 in the mid-1990s. The Western Ghats and their outflanking hills in southern India constitute one of the most extensive extant strongholds of gaur, in particular in the Wayanad – Nagarhole – Mudumalai – Bandipur complex. The populations in India, Bhutan and Bangladesh are estimated to comprise 23,000–34,000 individuals. Major populations of about 2,000 individuals have been reported in both Nagarahole and Bandipur National Parks, over 1,000 individuals in Tadoba Andhari Tiger Project, 500–1,000 individuals in both Periyar Tiger Reserve and Silent Valley and adjoining forest complexes, and over 800 individuals in Bhadra Wildlife Sanctuary. Trishna Wildlife Sanctuary in southern Tripura is home to a significant number of individuals.

In Bhutan, they apparently persist all over the southern foothill zone, notably in Royal Manas National Park, Phibsoo Wildlife Sanctuary and Khaling Wildlife Sanctuary.

In Bangladesh, a few gaur occur in the Chittagong Hill Tracts, mostly in Banderban district. During a camera trap project, few gaur were recorded indicating that the population is fragmented and probably declining.

In Thailand, the gaur once occurred throughout the country, but fewer than 1,000 individuals were estimated to have remained in the 1990s. In the mostly semi-evergreen Dong Phaya Yen Mountains, it was recorded at low density at the turn of the century, with an estimated total of about 150 individuals.

In Vietnam, the gaur occurred in several areas in Đắk Lắk Province in 1997. Several herds persist in Cát Tiên National Park and in adjacent state forest enterprises. The current status of the gaur population is poorly known; it may be in serious decline.

In Cambodia, the gaur population declined considerably in the period from the late 1960s to the early 1990s. The most substantial population of the country remained in Mondulkiri Province, where up to 1,000 individuals may have survived up to 2010 in a forested landscape of over 15,000 km^{2} (5,800 sq mi). Results of camera trapping carried out in 2009 suggested a globally significant gaur population in Sre Pok Wildlife Sanctuary and the contiguous Phnom Prich Wildlife Sanctuary. Line transect distance sampling in Keo Seima Wildlife Sanctuary revealed around 500 individuals in 2010, but only 33 individuals were encountered in 2020. Encounter rates in Sre Pok Wildlife Sanctuary and Phnom Prich Wildlife Sanctuary in 2020 were low with 0-5 individuals sighted in 10 km (6.2 mi) long transects.

In Laos, up to 200 individuals were estimated to inhabit protected area boundaries in the mid-1990s. They were reported discontinuously distributed in low numbers. Overhunting had reduced the population, and survivors occurred mainly in remote sites. Fewer than six National Biodiversity Conservation Areas held more than 50 individuals. Areas with populations likely to be nationally important included the Nam Theun catchment and the adjoining plateau. Subsequent surveys carried out a decade later using fairly intensive camera trapping did not record any gaur any more, indicating a massive decline of the population.

In China, the gaur was present up to the 34th parallel north during the late Neolithic period about 5,200 years BP. Now it occurs only in heavily fragmented populations in Yunnan and southeastern Tibet. By the 1980s, it was extirpated in Lancang County, and the remaining animals were split into two populations in Xishuangbanna–Simao District and Cangyuan. In the mid-1990s, a population of 600–800 individuals may have lived in Yunnan Province, with the majority occurring in Xishuangbanna National Nature Reserve.

In 2016, it was estimated that the global population has declined by more than 70% in Indochina and Malaysia during the last three generations of 24–30 years, and that the gaur is locally extinct in Sri Lanka. Populations in well-protected areas appeared to be stable.

== Ecology and behaviour ==
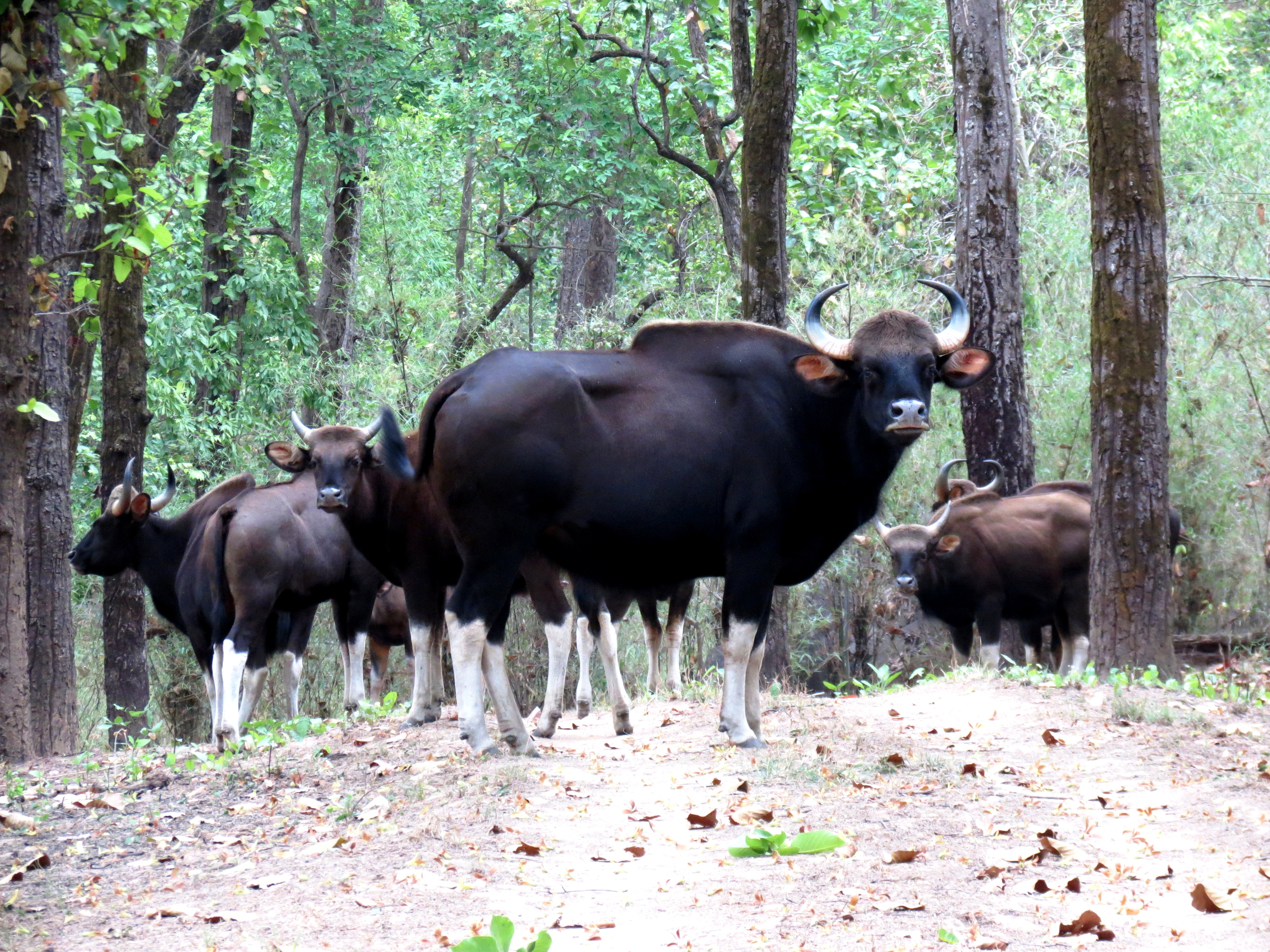
A herd in Kanha National Park, India

Where gaur herds have not been disturbed, they are basically diurnal. In other areas, they have become largely nocturnal due to human impact on the forest. In central India, they are most active at night, and are rarely seen in the open after 8 o'clock in the morning. During the dry season, herds congregate and remain in small areas, dispersing into the hills with the arrival of the monsoon. While gaur depend on water for drinking, they do not seem to bathe or wallow.

In January and February, gaur live in small herds of eight to 11 individuals, one of which is a bull. In April or May, more bulls may join the herd for mating, and individual bulls may move from herd to herd, each mating with many cows. In May or June, they leave the herd and may form herds of bulls only or live alone. Herds wander 2–5 km (1.2–3.1 mi) each day. Each herd has a nonexclusive home range, and sometimes herds may join in groups of 50 or more.

Gaur herds are led by an old adult female, the matriarch. Adult males may be solitary. During the peak of the breeding season, unattached males wander widely in search of receptive females. No serious fighting between males has been recorded, with size being the major factor in determining dominance. Males make a mating call of clear, resonant tones which may carry for more than 1.6 km (1 mi). Gaur have also been known to make a whistling snort as an alarm call, and a low, cow-like moo.

In some regions in India where human disturbance is minor, the gaur is very timid and shy despite its great size and power. When alarmed, gaur crash into the jungle at a surprising speed. However, in Southeast Asia and South India, where they are used to the presence of humans, gaur are said by locals to be very bold and aggressive. They are frequently known to go into fields and graze alongside domestic cattle, sometimes killing them in fights. Gaur bulls may charge without provocation, especially during summer, when the intense heat and parasitic insects make them more short-tempered than usual. To warn other members of its herd of approaching danger, the gaur lets out a high whistle for help.

=== Feeding ecology ===
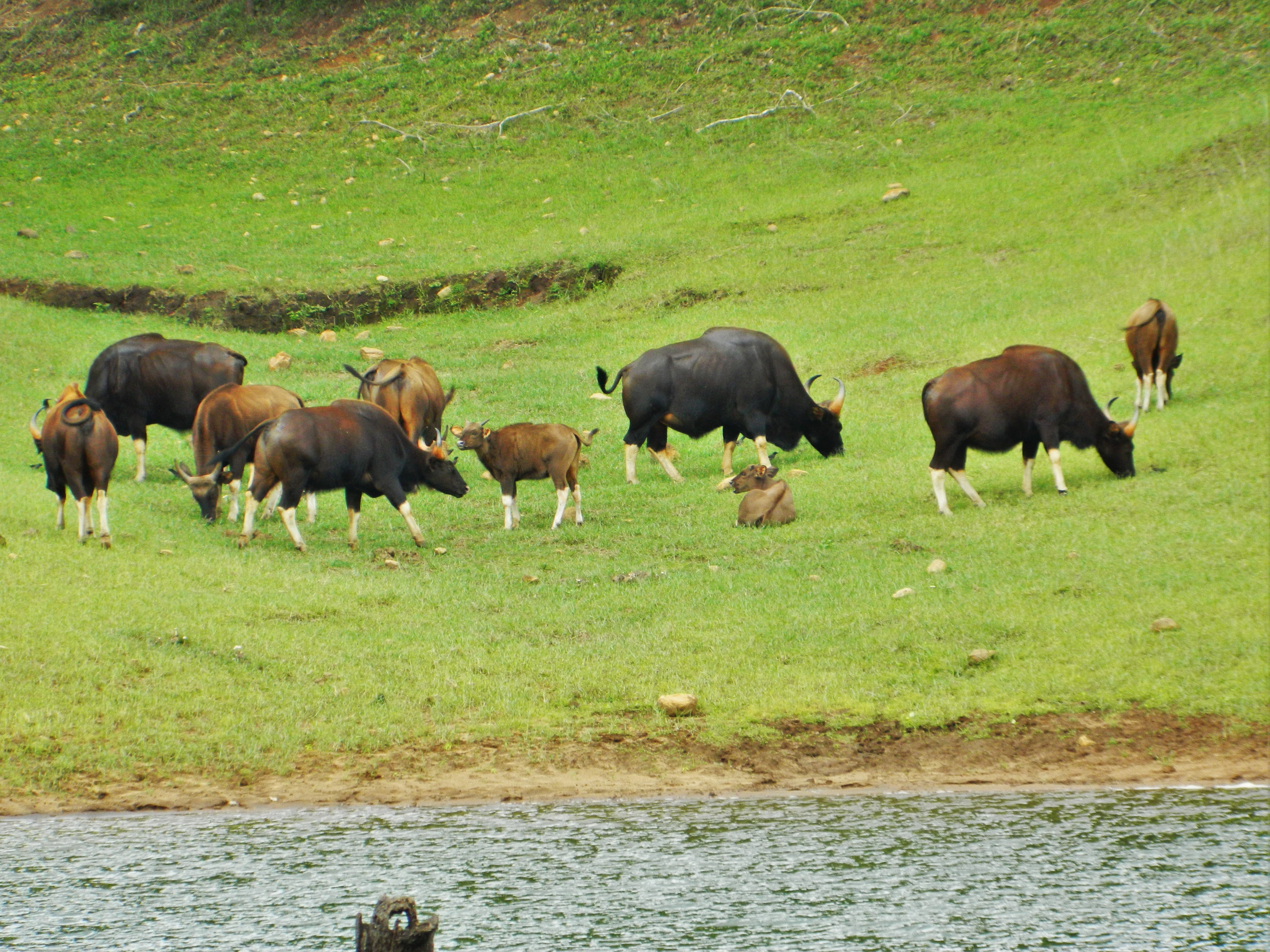
A herd in Periyar National Park

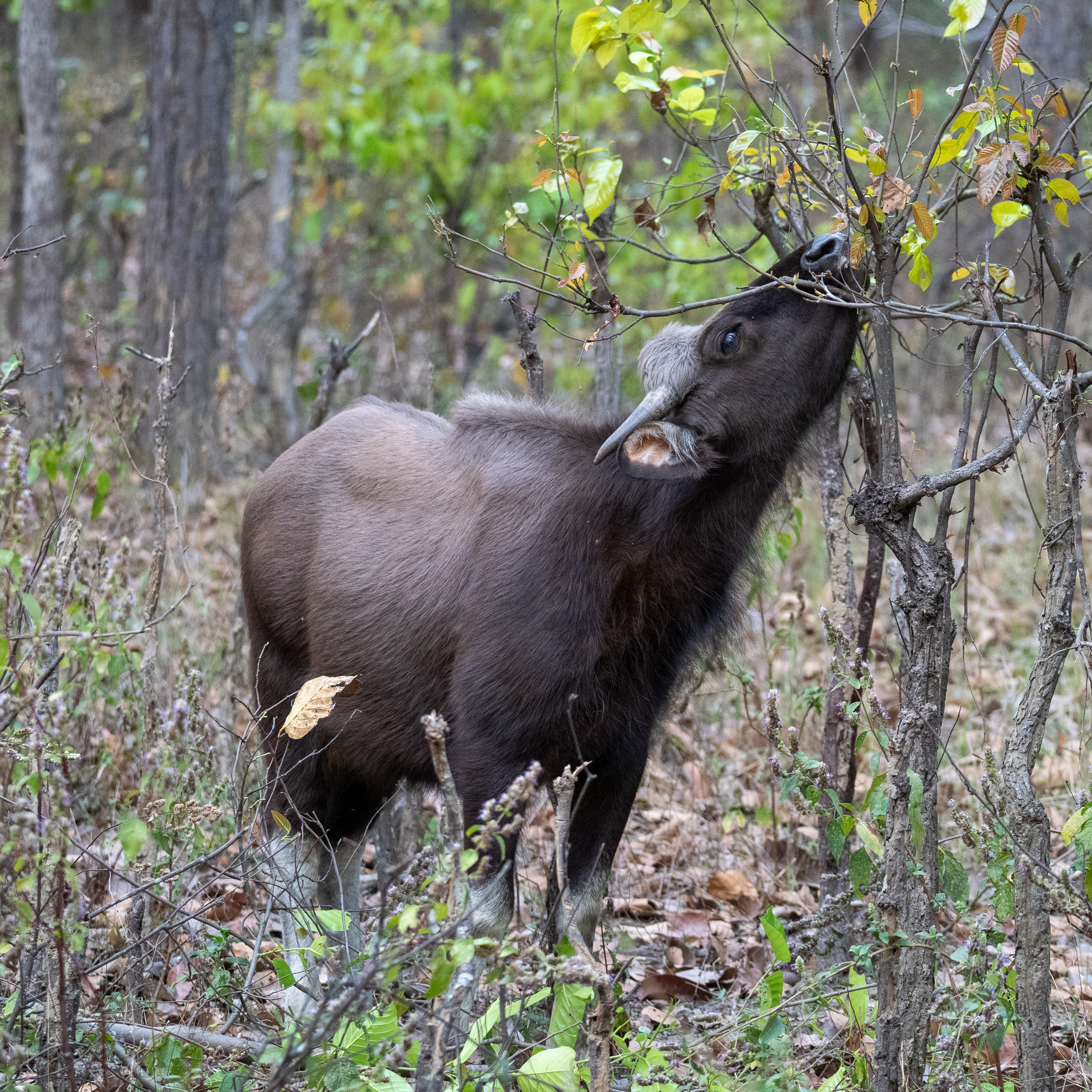
A calf eating leaf in Kanha National Park

The gaur grazes and browses mostly the upper portions of plants, such as leaf blades, stems, seeds and flowers of grass species, including kadam Adina cordifolia. During a survey in the Bhagwan Mahaveer Sanctuary and Mollem National Park, gaurs were observed to feed on 32 species of plants. They consume herbs, young shoots, flowers, fruits of elephant apple (Dillenia) with a high preference for leaves. Food preference varies by season. In winter and monsoon, they feed on preferably fine and fresh true grasses and herb species of the legume family, such as tick clover (Desmodium triflorum), but also browse on leaves of shrub species such as karvy (Strobilanthes callosus), Indian boxwood (Gardenia latifolia), mallow-leaved crossberry (Grewia abutifolia), East-Indian screw tree (Helicteres) and the chaste tree (Vitex negundo). In summer, they also feed on bark of teak (Tectona grandis), on fruit of golden shower tree (Cassia fistula), and on the bark and fruit of cashew (Anacardium occidentale). Gaur spent most of their daily time feeding. Peak feeding activity was observed between 6:30 and 8:30 in the mornings and between 17:30 and 18:45 in the evenings. During the hottest hours of the day, they rest in the shade of big trees.

They may debark trees due to shortages of preferred food, and of minerals and trace elements needed for their nutrition, or for maintaining an optimum fiber/protein ratio for proper digestion of food and better assimilation of nutrients. They may turn to available browse species and fibrous teak bark in summer as green grass and herbaceous resources dry up. High concentrations of calcium (22400 ppm) and phosphorus (400 ppm) have been reported in teak bark, so consumption of teak bark may help animals to satisfy both mineral and other food needs. Long-term survival and conservation of these herbivores depend on the availability of preferred plant species for food. Hence, protection of the historically preferred habitats used by gaur is a significant factor in conservation biology.

=== Reproduction ===
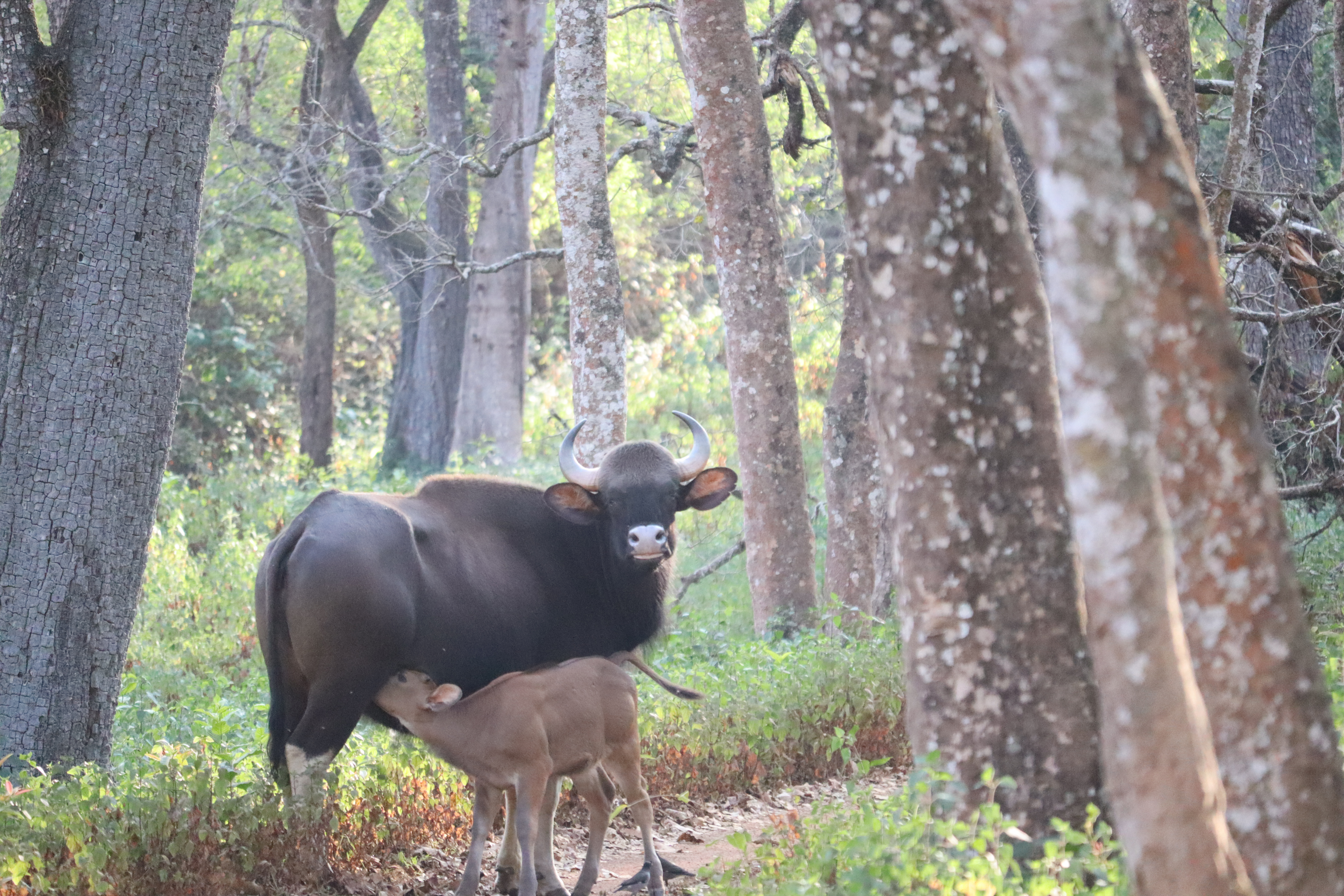
A gaur with calf

Sexual maturity occurs in the gaur's second or third year. Breeding takes place year-round, but typically peaks between December and June. Females have one calf, rarely two, after a gestation period of about 275 days, a few days less than domestic cattle. Calves are typically weaned after seven to 12 months. The lifespan of a gaur in captivity is up to 30 years.

=== Natural predators ===
Due to its size and power, the gaur has few natural predators besides humans. Leopards, dhole packs and large mugger crocodiles occasionally attack unguarded calves or unhealthy animals. Only tigers and saltwater crocodiles have been reported to kill adult gaur. However, the habitat and distribution of the gaur and saltwater crocodile seldom overlap in recent times, due to the decreasing range of both species. A crocodile likely would need to be a mature adult male of more than 3.7 m (12 ft) and 300 kg (660 lb) to make a successful attack on a healthy adult gaur.

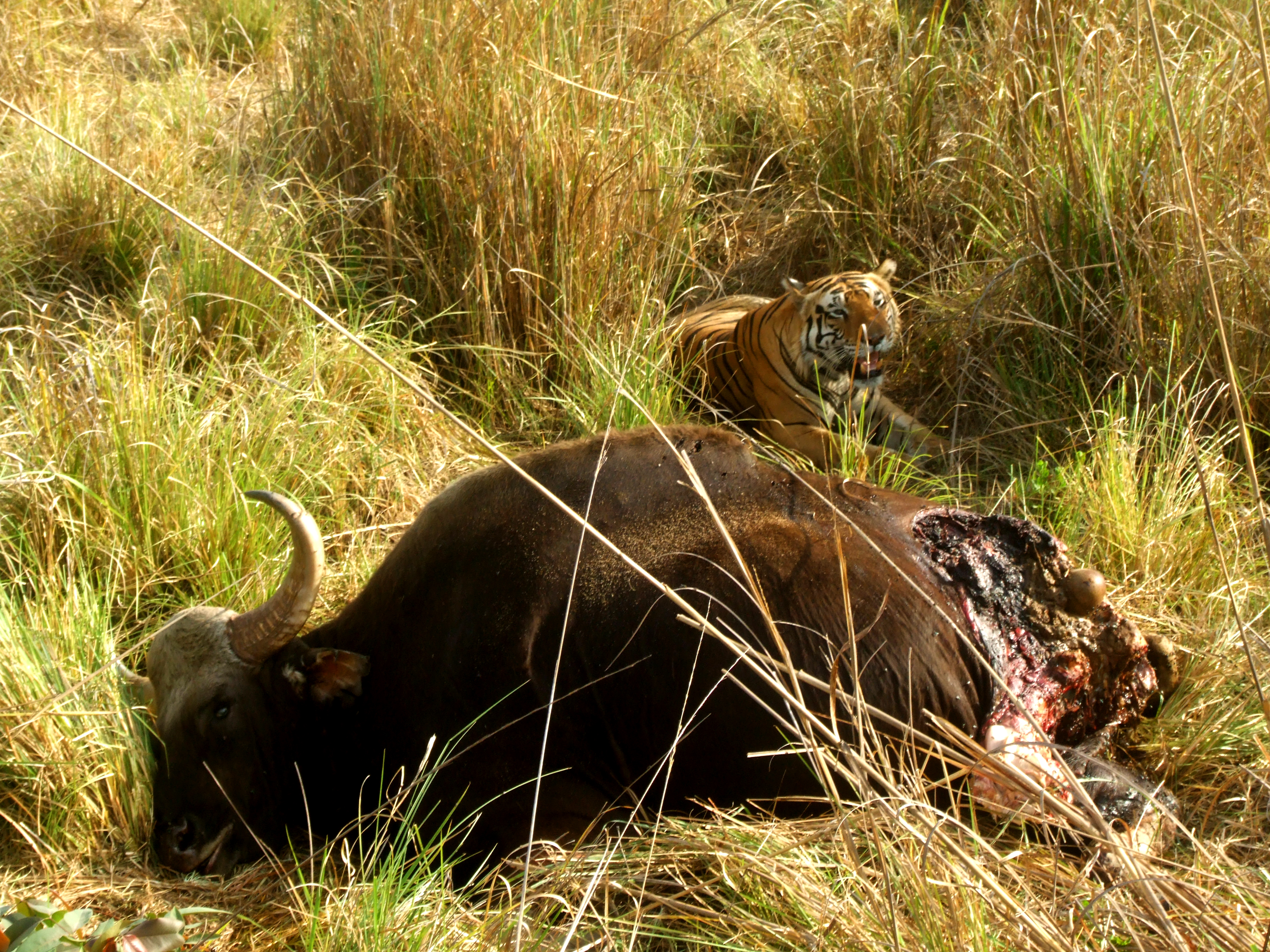
A tiger with gaur carcass

Tigers hunt young or infirm gaur, but have also been reported to have killed healthy bulls weighing at least 1,000 kg (2,200 lb). When confronted by a tiger, the adult members of a gaur herd often form a circle surrounding the vulnerable young and calves, shielding them from the big cat. As tigers rely on ambush attacks when taking on prey as large as a gaur, they will almost always abandon a hunt if detected and met in this manner. A herd of gaur in Malaysia encircled a calf killed by a tiger and prevented it from approaching the carcass. Nevertheless, the gaur is a formidable opponent to the tiger and capable of killing tigers in self-defence.

== Threats ==
In Laos, the gaur is highly threatened by poaching for trade to supply international markets, but also by opportunistic hunting, and specific hunting for home consumption. In the 1990s, gaurs were particularly sought by Vietnamese poachers for their commercial value. In Thailand, the gaur is severely threatened by poaching for commercial trade in meat and trophies.

== Conservation ==
The gaur is listed in CITES Appendix I, and is legally protected in all range states.

=== In captivity ===
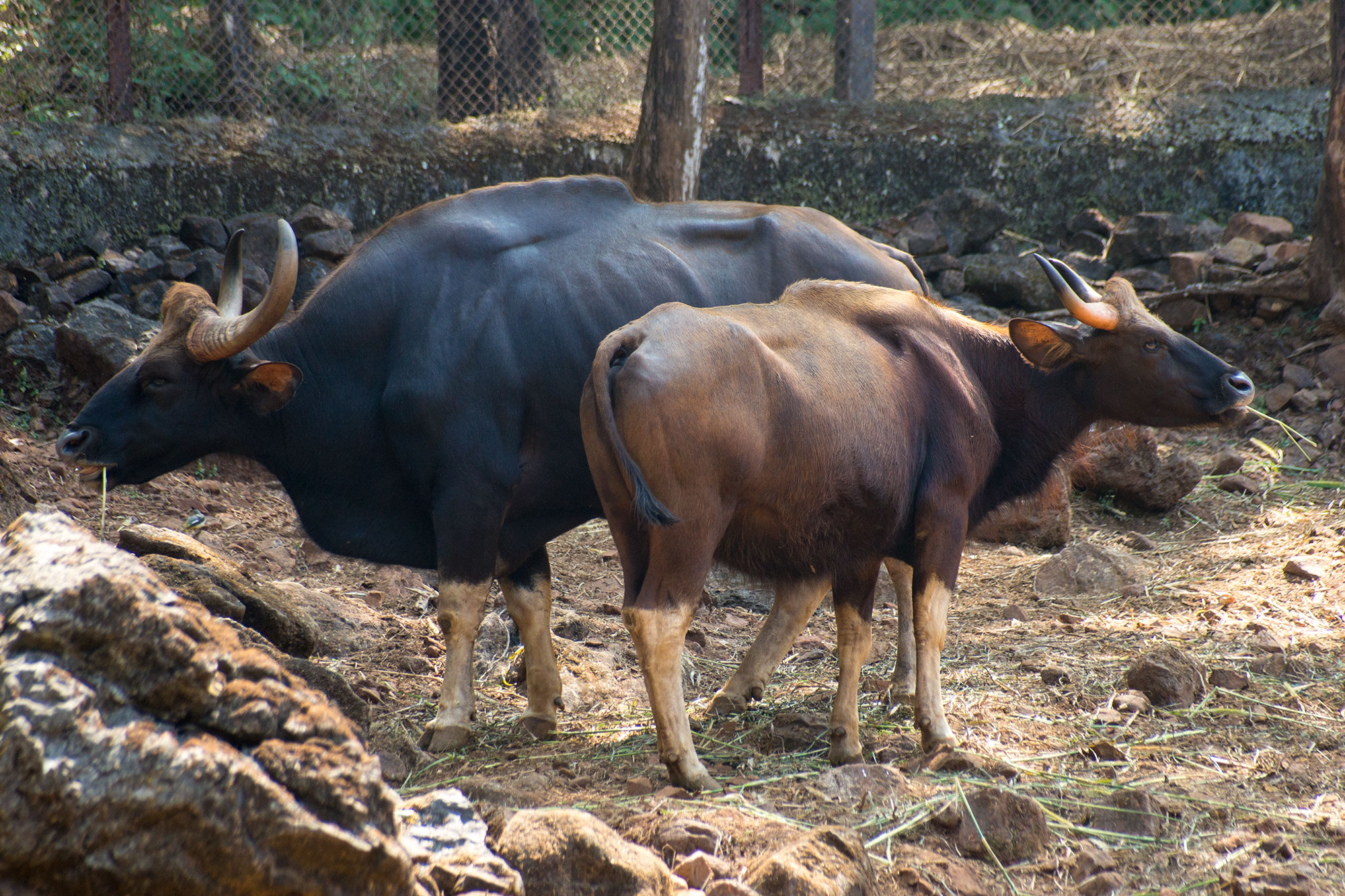
In Bondla zoo, Goa

On 8 January 2001, the first cloned gaur was born at Trans Ova Genetics in Sioux Center, Iowa. The calf was carried and brought successfully to term by a surrogate mother, a domestic cow (Bos taurus). While healthy at birth, the calf died within 48 hours of a common dysentery, most likely unrelated to cloning.

== See also ==
- Anoa
- Noah (gaur)
- Drawings by Douglas Hamilton
- Largest organisms
