= Trishna Wildlife Sanctuary =

Wildlife sanctuary in Tripura, India

- IUCN category IV (habitat/species management area)
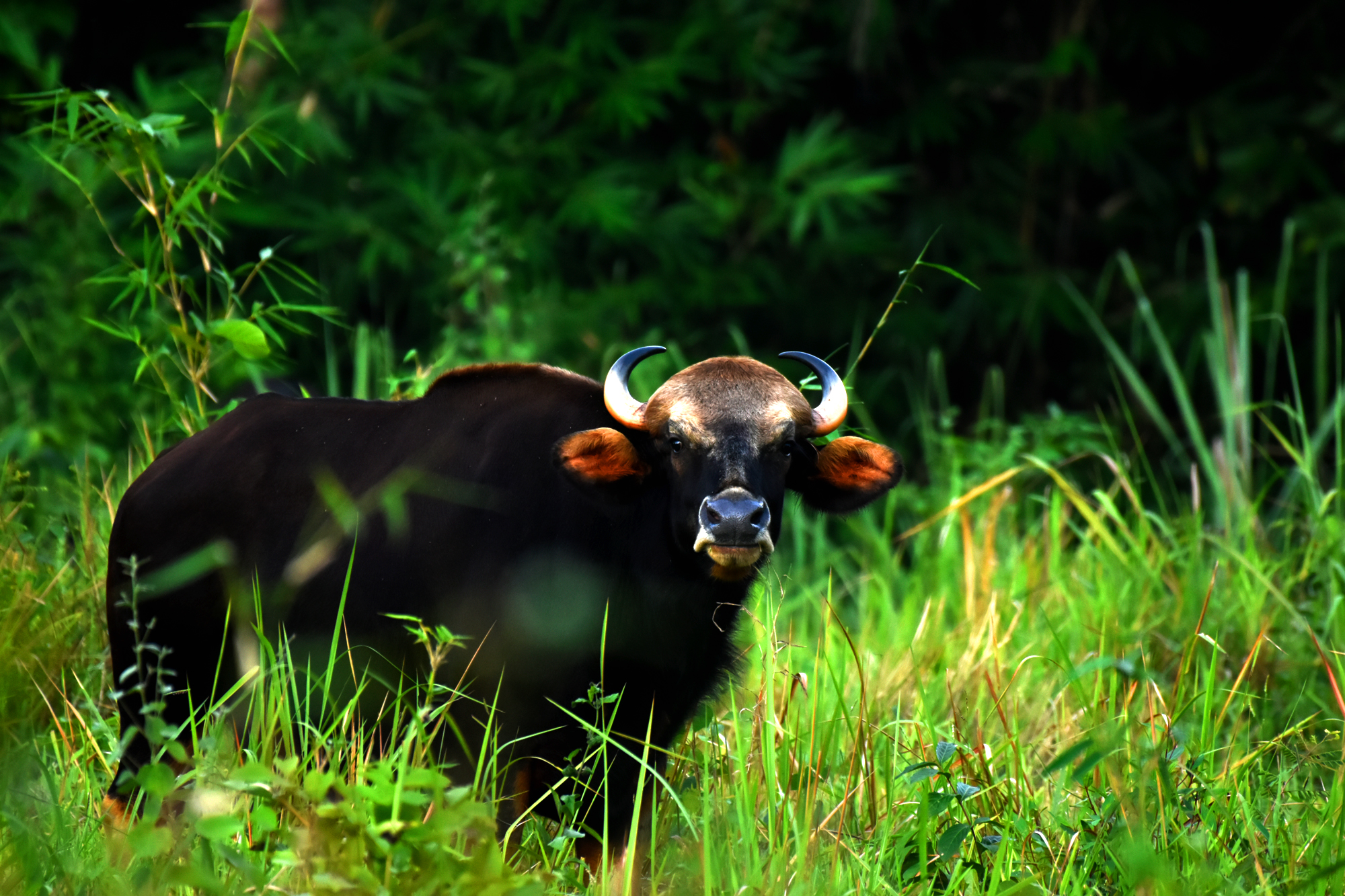
- An Indian gaur at the sanctuary

- Location within Tripura Location within India
- Interactive map of Trishna Wildlife Sanctuary
- Location: South Tripura district, Tripura
- Nearest city: Udaipur
- Coordinates: 23°25′18″N 91°18′47″E
- Area: 194.7 km^{2} (75.2 sq mi)
- Established: 1988

Trishna Wildlife Sanctuary is a wildlife sanctuary in the South Tripura district of the Indian state of Tripura.

== Description ==
Trishna Wildlife Sanctuary covers an area of 194.7 km^{2} (75.2 sq mi) and was declared a protected area in 1988.

== Flora and fauna ==
The vegetation consists of deciduous and semi-evergreen forests. Major wildlife include the gaur, Hoolock gibbon, golden langur, capped langur and birds such as pheasant-tailed jacana, white-breasted kingfisher, black drongo, tailorbird, jungle myna.
