= Noah (gaur) =

Cloned animal

Noah, a few hours after birth

Noah was the first cloned gaur. He was cloned and gestated in the womb of a cow named Bessie. Gaurs are listed as a vulnerable species on the IUCN Red List. Noah was delivered on January 8, 2001, but died of dysentery on January 10, 2001. Noah's condition was monitored by Dr. Jonathan Hill and his teammates in Iowa. The process used to clone Noah was nuclear transfer.
