= Noah (American painter) =

American painter

Noah Elias is an American artist, known simply as Noah, working within the fine art market and custom art scene. He is best known for painting the Suki art car in 2 Fast 2 Furious, but is also a widely collected painter of Disney Fine Art.

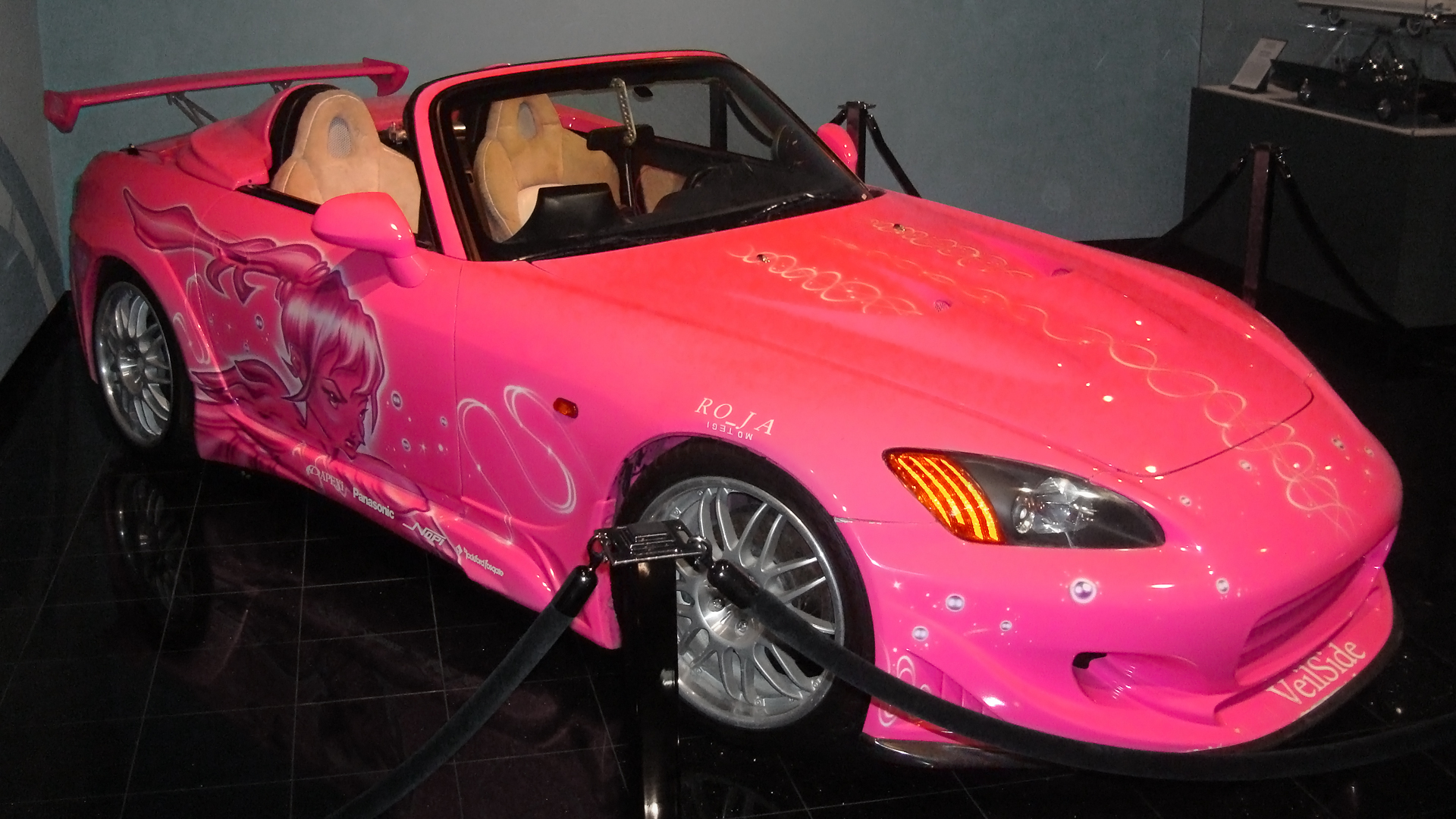
Honda S2000 painted by Noah for the character Suki in 2 Fast 2 Furious

Some of his other professional pursuits include producing online educational courses, as well as offering consulting services designed to equip creatives and artists with essential business skills, enabling them to achieve a prosperous and sustainable livelihood.

== Biography ==
Noah was born March 28, 1971, in Orange County, California, and found he had a gift early on:

I started my company when I was still in high school. I was doing lettering, signs and promotional banners for businesses and restaurants... My business card was even in the high school yearbook.

Noah soon took his art to the streets, painting portraits of celebrities on canvas for huge crowds outside neighborhood coffee shops. His portraits soon attracted collectors like Nicole Kidman, Tom Cruise, Val Kilmer, Craig T. Nelson and The Black Crowes. This celebrity exposure made Noah an overnight star within the art community. Soon after, corporate clients like Lexus Motor Cars, Levi's Jeans and Toyota, were asking Noah to enhance their corporate collections and ad campaigns.

Noah had long since realized that "canvas was the ticket... It allowed [him] to spend a much time on a piece and generate income." Before long, though, Noah began painting on different surfaces: "I have come up with different avenues in my work, and I meet a lot of markets that way." And in 2004 he garnered international fame for his paint job, or "rolling canvas," on the Suki car in Universal Pictures' hit movie, 2 Fast 2 Furious. He has since won "Best Paint" at S.E.M.A. (Specialty Equipment Marketing Association) 4 years in a row for the "rolling canvases" he created on behalf of Alpine Electronics. Noah is also known for the body art he has applied for many ad campaigns; most recently he did body art on the recording artist Pink, decorating her body with tattoos for a music video.

Noah now devotes a substantial amount of his time towards creating Disney Fine Art, a mixture of his unique style and those beloved Disney characters. He feels very "blessed with the unique opportunity to create art that helps carry on the legacy and heritage of Walt Disney's dream."

== Style ==
Each canvas begins with a rough sketch. Once a subject and composition are chosen, Noah uses models and also his own photographs as references. Once he has sketched his composition onto canvas (or any of the many different types of surfaces he paints on), Noah proceeds to carefully airbrush the composition and over paints with many different effects from his vast arsenal of painting techniques.

I like to mix photorealism with drips and rags. It contradicts itself but it works at the very end – the organic and natural contrasts beautifully with the structure of the airbrush and photorealism. It’s a nice marriage of techniques that gives the work more depth. The effect is almost Trompe-l'œil; especially with the water drops on the flowers.
