= NOHA (academic organisation) =

Network on Humanitarian Action

Network on Humanitarian Action (NOHA) is an international association of universities offering post-graduate level degree courses for humanitarian agencies and relief workers. The NOHA Masters programme initiative was launched in 1993 under the auspices of the Erasmus-Socrates Programme with additional financial support from the Directorate-General for European Civil Protection and Humanitarian Aid Operations (ECHO).

== History ==
The association was founded by five European universities in 1993; namely Aix-Marseille Université, University of Bochum, University of Deusto, Université catholique de Louvain and Oxford University. In 2015 the network had expanded to include twelve European members and five global partner universities. These were Aix-Marseille Université, Københavns Universitet, University of Malta, Rijksuniversiteit Groningen, Ruhr-Universität Bochum, Universidad de Deusto, University College Dublin, Università di Pavia, Université catholique de Louvain, Uniwersytet Warszawski, Uppsala universitet, and Vilniaus universitetas. With Oxford University having left the network.

== Current members ==
The network members as of 2026 are:

- (France) Aix-Marseille Université
- University of Malta
- (Netherlands) Rijksuniversiteit Groningen
- (Germany) Ruhr-Universität Bochum
- (Spain) Universidad de Deusto
- (Republic of Ireland) University College Dublin
- (Poland) Uniwersytet Warszawski
- (Sweden) Uppsala universitet
- (Lithuania) Vilniaus universitetas
