= Noah (soundtrack) =

Noah (Music from the Motion Picture)

Film score by Clint Mansell
- Released: March 25, 2014
- Recorded: 2013–2014
- Genre: Film score
- Length: 78:30
- Label: Nonesuch
- Producer: Clint Mansell

Clint Mansell chronology
Filth (2013)	Noah (2014)	High-Rise (2016)

Noah (Music from the Motion Picture) is the score album to the 2014 film of the same name directed by Darren Aronofsky. Featuring music produced by Aronofsky's regular collaborator Clint Mansell, the album features 22 tracks from the score and an original song written by Aronofsky and performed by Clint Mansell. The album was released by Nonesuch Records on March 25, 2014.

== Development ==
On December 11, 2012, at the Marrakech International Film Festival, Aronofsky confirmed that Mansell would score Noah in their sixth film together. While discussing about the film's music, Aronofsky did not want typical epic music, but needed to have that epic scale and wanted to figure out "something timeless". He did not want ethnic instrumentation and specific feel of time and place as the story takes place before culture and "more primal and connected to the earth". They deviated from piano and brass and held a day-long choir to avoid sounding it like "church music" but can be from any period.

Mansell and Aronofsky examined the scene where Noah's family were under captive by the Watchers. He recalled that the Watchers theme should sound primitive which Aronofsky agreed, saying that he need an Ornette Coleman's free jazz-kind of score, reminiscent of Jimi Hendrix's style, as it should be "tension-building, fear-evoking, and mind-expanding". According to Aronofsky, "[t]he creation sequence was so hard, but he [Mansell] came up with this sweet melody". Mansell created several themes that relate to different characters. He needed a theme for Noah (Russell Crowe), which is about living at peace with the planet, a theme for Ila (Emma Watson), which was "the mother of humanity". Along with the orchestra, Mansell roped in Kronos Quartet to contribute to the film score. While the orchestra recorded each portion, Mansell had recorded the score with the Kronos Quartet for a week, blending and mixing the score similar to Jimi Hendrix playing violins, "ripping, shredding and make crazy sounds with their instruments".

Although Mansell felt it as a "big budget" and "high calibre", he found the demands to be "burdensome, and even offensive and insulting". He recalled the executives from Paramount Pictures wanted to fire him as "they didn't feel they were getting what they wanted" although Aronofsky retained him in the project, which he described "Filmmaking at that level is not about art and expressing yourself. It's about maximizing your box office potential. Darren, to his credit, protected me from that to the point that, through lots of shenanigans", the score was recorded without the studio hearing another note or having any more input. Mansell felt that he put the stress and creative frustration to good use, as the score was "very heavy, angry and dark".

== Track listing ==
No.	Title	Length
1.	"In The Beginning, There Was Nothing"	4:08
2.	"The World Was Filled With Violence"	1:29
3.	"The End Of All Flesh Is Before Me"	2:14
4.	"Sweet Savour"	4:27
5.	"The Fallen Ones"	3:57
6.	"For Seasons, And For Days, And Years"	2:25
7.	"Make Thee An Ark"	5:09
8.	"Every Creeping Thing That Creeps"	5:46
9.	"I Will Destroy Them"	2:53
10.	"Flesh Of My Flesh"	1:42
11.	"The Wickedness Of Man"	1:38
12.	"In Sorrow Thou Shalt Bring Forth Children"	3:55
13.	"Your Eyes Shall Be Opened, And Ye Shall Be As Gods"	2:23
14.	"The Flood Waters Were Upon The World"	3:00
15.	"By Man Shall His Blood Be Shed"	3:32
16.	"The Judgement Of Man"	2:44
17.	"The Spirit Of The Creator Moved Upon The Face Of The Waters"	2:59
18.	"Forty Days And Nights"	3:19
19.	"What Is This That Thou Hast Done?"	2:10
20.	"The Fear And The Dread Of You"	4:23
21.	"And He Remembered Noah"	4:18
22.	"Day And Night Shall Not Cease"	5:49
23.	"Mercy Is" (Patti Smith)	4:10
Total length:		78:30

== Reception ==
Music critic Jonathan Broxton of Movie Music UK praised the osundtrack, saying: "the larger concentration on the orchestral core, the much less severe electronic and experimental aspects, the significantly heightened emotional content, and the generally improved dramatic sensibility that Mansell has developed over the course of the last eight years make Noah, a much more fulfilling experience". Josh Goller of Spectrum Culture commented "The Noah soundtrack unfortunately doesn't reach the soaring heights of psychological terror found in the latter film's leitmotif "Lux Aeterna," but it's a watertight score that surges and drifts along, transporting the listener into legend-minded headspace." John Robb of Louder than War gave a 10/10 rating calling it as a "masterpiece". Thom Jurek of AllMusic reviewed "Noah is an exceptional score, noteworthy even in Mansell's distinguished oeuvre." Filmtracks.com wrote: "The entire score takes the best intentions of the thoughtfulness behind The Fountain are translates enough of Sahara's instrumentation and motific adherence to norms into the equation to produce an entertaining middle ground [...] Mansell really has excelled at matching Aronofsky's continued, eccentric views on life, and, in Noah, that work yields a solid listening experience on album."

Mark Kermode of The Guardian wrote: "Underneath all the madness is Clint Mansell's surging, swirling, haunting score, featuring a recurrent refrain that reminded me of the aching longing of David Bowie's Warszawa (some of the instrumental soundscapes from Low were originally intended as incidental music for The Man Who Fell to Earth – another genetic link to sci-fi). With its blend of eerie futurism and ancient bombast, Mansell's music lends harmony to the cacophony of human voices." Matt Goldberg of Collider commented it as "must-own score". Soctt Foundas of Variety commented it as "richly orchestrated score" that "alternates thunderous percussive beats with New Age-y twangs and hums". Choire Sicha of The Awl criticised it as the "worst score to date".
