= Noah (duo) =

Danish music duo

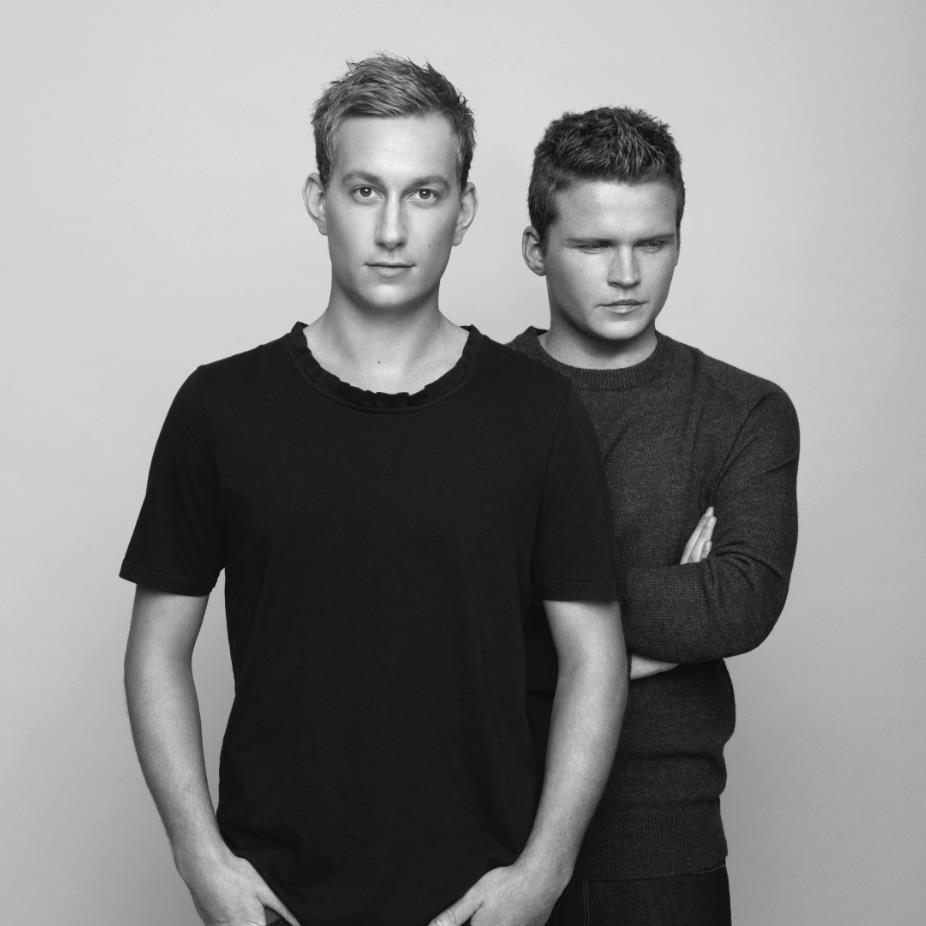

Background information
- Also known as: Troels Gustavsen
- Origin: Denmark
- Genres: Pop
- Years active: 2008–2020
- Labels: Copenhagen Records
- Past members: Lasse Dyrholm; Troels Gustavsen

Noah stylized as NOAH was the stage name of Danish singer and songwriter Troels Gustavsen. Originally a duo, at the end of 2015 it was announced Lasse Dyrholm had left the group to pursue other creative ventures. Since 2020 Gustavsen has performed under his own name.

Dyrholm and Gustavsen met at school in 2008 and started making music together. They released some songs online that proved very popular. They signed with Copenhagen Records in 2011 as well as recording of "Alt er forbi" (meaning Everything is over in English), their debut single on the label that debuted at number 21 on Tracklisten, the official Danish singles chart in February 2012. The duo released their self-titled debut album Noah on 20 May 2013. On 31 December 2015, it was announced that Dyrholm had left to pursue other creative ventures. As such, "Vi brænder" became the first single to be released in June 2016 after Dyrholm's departure. Subsequently, it was chosen as Denmark's official Olympic song during the 2016 Olympics in Rio de Janeiro.

== Discography ==
=== Albums ===
Year	Albums	Peak Position	Certification
Year	Albums	DEN	Certification
2013	Noah	2	
2016	1988	3	IFPI DEN: 3× Platinum

=== Singles ===
Year	Single	Peak Position	Certification	Album
Year	Single	DEN	Certification	Album
2012	"Alt er forbi"	14		Noah
2012	"Over byen"	8		Noah
2013	"Det' Okay"	2		Noah
2013	"Dine fodspor"	35		Noah
2013	"Endnu en nat"	17		TBA
2015	"Før vi falder"	26		TBA
2016	"Kære mor"	19		TBA
