= Noah (Noah album) =

Studio album by Noah
- Released: 20 May 2013
- Recorded: 2011−2013
- Label: Copenhagen Records

Singles from Noah
- 1. "Alt er forbi" Released: 30 January 2012; 2. "Over byen" Released: 10 September 2012; 3. "Det' okay" Released: 8 April 2013; 4. "Dine fodspor" Released: 20 May 2013

Noah is the debut studio album of the Danish duo Noah. It was released on 20 May 2013 on Copenhagen Records debuting at number 2 in its first week of release. The duo had already pre-released two successful singles from the album in 2012, namely "Alt er forbi" and "Over byen". Just prior to the release of the album, Noah released yet a third single "Det' okay" from the album.

== Track listing ==
All songs by Troels Gustavsen and Lasse Dyrholm

1. "Det' okay" (4:02)
2. "Ekko" (3:27)
3. "Over byen" (4:04)
4. "Dine fodspor" (3:38)
5. "Når vi falder" (4:06)
6. "Tilbage til mig selv" (4:18)
7. "Alt er forbi" (3:57)
8. "Kun dig og mig" (3:08)
9. "Mælkevej" (4:23)
10. "Godnat København" (3:36)

== Charts ==
| Chart (2013) | Peak position |
|---|---|
| Danish Albums Chart | 2 |
