= Noa (band) =

French progressive rock band

- Origin: Nantes, France
- Genres: Progressive rock; free jazz; Zeuhl
- Years active: 1980–?
- Past members: Philippe Vincendeau; Christian Robard; Bernard Nicolas; Alain Gaubert; Claudie Nicolas

Noa was a French zeuhl group. The band claims influences from the progressive rock bands Henry Cow and Art Zoyd.

The group's lineup was Philippe Vincendeau on saxophones, Christian Robard on drums, vibraphone and xylophone, Bernard Nicolas on flute and soprano saxophone, Alain Gaubert on guitar and bass, and Claudie Nicolas on vocals.

In 2011, the band's only album, Noa, was re-released by the label Soleil Zeuhl.
