= List of acronyms: G =

This list contains acronyms, initialisms, and pseudo-blends that begin with the letter G.

For the purposes of this list:

- acronym = an abbreviation pronounced as if it were a word, e.g., SARS = severe acute respiratory syndrome, pronounced to rhyme with cars
- initialism = an abbreviation pronounced wholly or partly using the names of its constituent letters, e.g., CD = compact disc, pronounced cee dee
- pseudo-blend = an abbreviation whose extra or omitted letters mean that it cannot stand as a true acronym, initialism, or portmanteau (a word formed by combining two or more words).

(a) = acronym, e.g.: SARS – (a) severe acute respiratory syndrome
(i) = initialism, e.g.: CD – (i) compact disc
(p) = pseudo-blend, e.g.: UNIFEM – (p) United Nations Development Fund for Women
(s) = symbol (none of the above, representing and pronounced as something else; for example: MHz – megahertz)

Some terms are spoken as either acronym or initialism, e.g., VoIP, pronounced both as voyp and V-O-I-P.

(Main list of acronyms)

- g – (s) Gram
- G – (s) Gauss – (i) General Audiences (movie rating) - Gewehr (German, rifle)

== G0–9 ==
- G1 – (s) Assistant Chief-of-Staff, Personnel
- G2 – (s) Assistant Chief-of-Staff, Intelligence
- G3 – many, including Heckler & Koch G3; see entry – (s) Assistant Chief-of-Staff, Operations and Plans
- G4
  - (i) Generation Four PowerPC microprocessor
  - (s) Assistant Chief-of-Staff, Logistics
- G5
  - (i) Generation Five PowerPC microprocessor
  - Group of Five conferences (US college sports, especially football)
  - (s) Assistant Chief-of-Staff, Public Affairs
- G6
  - (s) Assistant Chief-of-Staff, Information Technology
  - (i) Group of 6 (France, Germany, United States, Japan, United Kingdom, Italy) (1975)
- G7 – (s) Assistant Chief-of-Staff, Training – (i) Group of 7 (G6 + Canada) (1976)
- G8 – (s) Assistant Chief-of-Staff, Finance – (i) Group of 8 (G7 + Russia) (1998)
- G9 – (s) Assistant Chief-of-Staff, Civil-Military Co-operation (CIMIC)
- G10 – (i) Group of 10 (G7 + Belgium, Netherlands, Sweden, Switzerland; numbering 11 in fact)
- G15 – (i) Group of 15 (subset of G77, formed 1989: Algeria, Argentina, Brazil, Chile, Egypt, India, Indonesia, Jamaica, Kenya, Nigeria, Malaysia, Mexico, Peru, Senegal, Sri Lanka, Venezuela and Zimbabwe; currently numbers 17)
- G20 – (i) Group of 20 (G8 + Argentina, Australia, Brazil, China, India, Indonesia, Mexico, Saudi Arabia, South Africa, South Korea, Turkey + current European Union presiding country) (1999)
- G24 – (i) Group of 24 (subset of G77, formed 1971: Algeria, Argentina, Brazil, Colombia, Côte d'Ivoire, Democratic Republic of the Congo, Egypt, Ethiopia, Gabon, Ghana, Guatemala, India, Iran, Lebanon, Mexico, Nigeria, Pakistan, Peru, Philippines, South Africa, Syria, Sri Lanka, Trinidad and Tobago and Venezuela)
- G77 – (i) Group of 77 (issued from the United Nations Conference on Commerce and Development, 1964; currently numbers 133)

== GA ==
- Ga – (s) Gallium – Gigaannum
- GA – (s) Gabon (ISO 3166 digram) – The Gambia (FIPS 10-4 country code) – (i) Gamblers Anonymous – Georgia (postal symbol) – Gigaampere – Goa (Indian state code) - (i) General Aviation
- GAAR – (a) General Anti-Avoidance Rule (tax evasion)
- GAB – (s) Gabon (ISO 3166 trigram)
- GABA – (i) Gamma-AminoButyric Acid
- GAD – (a) Generalized Anxiety Disorder
- GALCIT – (a) Guggenheim Aeronautical Laboratory, California Institute of Technology
- GAO – (i) U.S. Government Accountability Office
- GAW – (i) Global Atmospheric Watch

== GB ==
- GB – (s) Gabon (FIPS 10-4 country code) – United Kingdom of Great Britain and Northern Ireland (ISO 3166 digram) [glamour boy 7-9/10]
- GBA – Game Boy Advance
- GBBC – (i) Great (Global) Backyard Bird Count
- GBE – (i) Knight/Dame Grand Cross of the Order of the British Empire
- GBH
  - (i) Great Bash Heel (Japanese professional wrestling stable)
  - Gregory Bonner Hale (British design and advertising agency)
  - Grievous bodily harm
- GBP – (s) United Kingdom pound sterling (ISO 4217 currency code)
- GBR – (s) United Kingdom of Great Britain and Northern Ireland (ISO 3166 trigram)
- GBU – (i) Glide-Bomb Unit – Global Business Unit(s)

== GC ==
- GC
  - (s) East Germany (NATO country code; obsolete 1990)
  - (i) General classification (cycling)
  - General counsel
  - George Cross (British civil decoration)
  - (s) Gigacoulomb [Grindr cruise]
- GCA – (i) Graduate in Claims Administration
- GCCS – (i/a) Global Command and Control System ("geeks")
- GCD – see entry
- GCF – (i) Greatest Common Factor
- GCI – (i) Ground-controlled interception
- GCN – (i) Gamma-ray burst Coordination Network
- GCS – (i) Global Coordinate System
- GCSE – (i) General Certificate of Secondary Education (UK)
- G-CSF – (i) Granulocyte Colony-Stimulating Factor

== GD ==
- gd – (s) Scottish Gaelic language (ISO 639-1 code)
- Gd – (s) Gadolinium
- GD – (s) Grenada (ISO 3166 digram)
- GDC
  - (i) Game Developers Conference
  - General Dental Council
- GDL – (i) Game Definition Language
- GDP
  - (i) General Dental Practitioner (UK)
  - Gross Domestic Product
- GDPR
  - (i) General Data Protection Regulation (EU law)
  - Gross domestic product of region
- GDR – (i) German Democratic Republic (cf. DDR)
- GDR – (i) General Distribution Release (Microsoft Term for a software service release; between Hotfix and Service Pack)
- GDW – (i) Game Designers Workshop

== GE ==
- Ge – (s) Germanium
- GE
  - (i) General Electric
  - Genetic Engineering (cf. GM)
  - (s) Georgia (ISO 3166 digram)
- GEBCO – (a) General Bathymetric Chart of the Oceans
- GEC – (i) Great Engineering Challenge
- GED – (i) General Educational Development (high school equivalency credential in the U.S. and Canada)
- GEEP – (i) Geophysical Equipment Exploration Platform
- GEICO – (p/a) Government Employees Insurance Company (GUY-coh)
- GEL
  - (s) Georgian lari (ISO 4217 currency code)
  - Gilbert and Ellice Islands (ISO 3166 trigram; obsolete 1977)
- GEMA
  - (a) Gas and Electricity Markets Authority
  - Georgia Emergency Management Agency
  - (p) Gesellschaft für musikalische Aufführungs- und mechanische Vervielfältigungsrechte (German performance rights organisation)
  - (a) Global Engine Manufacturing Alliance
- GEN – (s) Full General (four stars) in the U.S. Army
- GEO
  - (a) Geostationary Earth Orbit
  - (s) Georgia (ISO 3166 trigram)
- GEOS – (i) Graphical Environment Operating System
- GEQ – (s) Equatorial Guinea (IOC trigram, but not FIFA or ISO 3166)
- GER – (s) Germany (IOC and FIFA trigram, but not ISO 3166)
- Gestapo – (p) GEheime STAatsPOlizei (German "secret state police")
- GeV – (s) Gigaelectron-volt
- GEV – (i) Ground Effect Vehicle

== GF ==
- GF
  - (s) French Guiana (ISO 3166 digram)
  - Gigafarad
- GFCF
  - (i) Gluten-free, casein-free diet
  - Gross fixed capital formation
- GFCI – (i) Ground Fault Circuit Interruptor (aka GFI)
- GFDL – (i) GNU Free Documentation License
- GFE
  - (i) Girlfriend experience (used in escort services)
  - Good Faith Estimate
  - Government Furnished Equipment
- GFI – (i) Ground Fault Interruptor (aka GFCI)
- GFL – (i) German Football League (Germany's Bundesliga for American football; the English-language name is used in German without translation)
- GFN – (i) Global Footprint Network
- GFW
  - (i) Global Force Wrestling – either the original incarnation or Impact Wrestling, which was briefly known under the name
  - (p) Great Firewall of China (cf. Internet censorship in China)
- GFY – (i) "good for you" or "go fuck yourself", depending on the context (Internet chat)

== GG ==
- GG – (s) Georgia (FIPS 10-4 country code)
- GGG – (i) Gennady Gennadyevich Golovkin, Kazakhstani boxer
- GGK – Good God Karma
- GGWP – Good Game Well Played
- GGP
  - (i) General Game Playing
- GGP – GeoGraphic Processor, Geographic Information System (GIS) originally the Greater London Council (GLC) in-house system and now GGP Ltd

== GH ==
- GH – (s) Ghana (ISO 3166 digram; FIPS 10-4 country code) – Gigahenry
- GHA – (s) Ghana (ISO 3166 trigram)
- GHB – (i) gamma-Hydroxybutyric acid
- GHC – (s) Ghanaian cedi (ISO 4217 currency code)

== GI ==
- Gi – (s) Gibi
- GI
  - (i) Galvanised Iron
  - Gastro-Intestinal
  - General Issue
  - (s) Gibraltar (ISO 3166 digram; FIPS 10-4 territory code)
  - (i) Government Issue
  - Global Illumination
- GIB – (s) Gibraltar (ISO 3166 trigram)
- GIF – (a) Graphics Interchange Format
- GIG – (a) Global Information Grid
- GIGN – (i) Groupe d'intervention de la Gendarmerie nationale (French, "National Gendarmerie Intervention Group'), French police tactical unit
- GIGO – (a) Garbage In Garbage Out (computing)
- GIMP – (a) GNU Image Manipulation Program
- GIN
  - (s) Guinea (ISO 3166 trigram)
  - (a) Guidelines International Network
- GIP – (s) Gibraltar pound (ISO 4217 currency code)
- GIS
  - (i) Geographic Information System
  - Google Image Search
- GISS
  - (a/i) General Impression of Size and Shape
  - Goddard Institute for Space Studies

== GJ ==
- GJ – (s) Gigajoule – Grenada (FIPS 10-4 country code) – Gujarat (Indian state code)
- GJD – (i) Geocentric Julian Day

== GK ==
- GK – (s) Gigakelvin – Guernsey (FIPS 10-4 territory code) - (s) Goalkeeper

== GL ==
- gl – (s) Galician language (ISO 639-1 code)
- GL
  - (s) Gigalitre
  - (i) Graphics Language
  - (s) Greenland (ISO 3166 digram; FIPS 10-4 territory code)
  - (i) Grenade Launcher
- gla – (s) Scottish Gaelic language (ISO 639-2 code)
- GLAAD – (a) Gay and Lesbian Alliance Against Defamation
- GLAC – (a) General Ledger Accounting Code
- GLAST – (a) Gamma-ray Large Area Space Telescope
- GLBA – (i) Gramm-Leach-Bliley Act
- GLC – (i) Gas-liquid chromatography
- gle – (s) Irish language (ISO 639-2 code)
- glg – (s) Galician language (ISO 639-2 code)
- GLINT
  - (a) Gallium-arsenide Laser Illuminator for Night TV
  - Gated Laser Illuminator for Narrow Television
  - (p) Gated Laser Intensifier (tape)
  - Gospel Literature International
  - Graphical Linux Installation Tool
- GLONASS – (a) Global'naya navigatsionnaya sputnikovaya sistema (Russian Глоба́льная Навигацио́нная Спу́тниковая Систе́ма, "Global Navigation Satellite System")
- GLP – (s) Guadeloupe (ISO 3166 trigram)
- GLSDB - (i) Ground Launched Small Diameter Bomb
- GLUT – (a/i) OpenGL Utility Toolkit
- glv – (s) Manx language (ISO 639-2 code)
- GLV – (i) Gained Life Value

== GM ==
- Gm – (s) Gigametre
- GM
  - (s) The Gambia (ISO 3166 digram)
  - (i) GameMaster (role-playing)
  - General Motors
  - Genetically Modified
  - (s) Germany (FIPS 10-4 country code)
  - (i) Guru Meditation (computing)
- GMAC
  - (i) General Motors Acceptance Corporation, the original name of the company now known as Ally Financial
  - Graduate Management Admission Council
- G-MAC
  - (i) Great Midwest Athletic Conference
- GMB
  - (s) The Gambia (ISO 3166 trigram)
  - (i) General, Municipal, Boilermakers (and Allied Trade Union)
- GmbH – (i) Gesellschaft mit beschränkter Haftung (German, "Company with limited liability")
- GMC
  - (i) U.K. General Medical Council
  - Gospel Music Channel
- GMD – (s) Gambian dalasi (ISO 4217 currency code)
- GMFSC – (i) Ground Mobile Forces Satellite Communications
- GMG - (i) Granatmaschinengewehr (German, Grenade Machine Gun)
- GMI
  - (i) Generic Model Interface
  - Geometry Model Instance
- GML
  - Generalized Markup Language
  - Geography Markup Language
  - Game Maker Language
  - Graph Modelling Language
  - Graphical Motion Language
  - GUI Markup Language
  - Hostomel Airport (IATA code)
- GMO – (i) Genetically Modified Organism
- GMPCS – (i) Global Mobile Personal Communications by Satellite
- GMT
  - (i) Giant Magellan Telescope
  - Greenwich Mean Time

== GN ==
- gn – (s) Guaraní language (ISO 639-1 code)
- GN
  - (s) Giganewton
  - Guinea (ISO 3166 digram)
- GNAS – (p) Grand National Archery Society
- GNB – (s) Guinea-Bissau (ISO 3166 trigram)
- GNC
  - (i) "G&C Records" NetLabel
  - General Nutrition Centers (US sports nutrition retailer branded as GNC)
- GNF – (s) Guinean franc (ISO 4217 currency code)
- GNOME – (a) GNU Network Object Model Environment
- GNP – (i) Gross National Product
- GNQ – (s) Equatorial Guinea (ISO 3166 trigram)
- GnRH – (p) Gonadotropin-Releasing Hormone
- GNU – (a) GNU's Not Unix

== GO ==
- GO – (s) Glorioso Islands (FIPS 10-4 territory code)
- GOA
  - (s) General of the Army (United States only)
  - (i) Gun Owners of America
- GOAT – (s) Greatest of all time (LL Cool J album title)
- GOBE – (a) Great Ordovician Biodiversification Event
- GOC – (i) General Officer Commanding
- GOES – (a) Geostationary Operational Environmental Satellite
- GOP – (i) Grand Old Party
- GOP – (a) God of Porn
- gorp – (a) granola, oats, raisins, peanuts (another name for trail mix), probably a backronym
- GOSC – (a/i) General Officer Steering Committee
- GOSH – (a) Great Ormond Street Hospital
- GOSP – (a) Gas/Oil Separation Plant
- GOTS – (a) Government off-the-shelf
- GOWI – (a) Get On With It
- GOYADIN – (a) Get Off Your Arse, Do It Now (anti-procrastination mantra)

== GP ==
- GP – (i) General Practitioner – General Purpose – Grand Prix – (s) Guadeloupe (ISO 3166 digram; FIPS 10-4 territory code)
- GPA – (i) Grade Point Average
- GPC – (i) Global Path Cache
- GPG – (i) GNU Privacy Guard
- GPIB – (i) General-Purpose Instrumentation/Interface Bus
- GPL – (i) GNU General Public License
- GPMP – (i) General Purpose Macro Processor
- GPU - (i) General Purpose Machine Gun
- GPO – (i) General Post Office
- GPPC – (i) Genetics and Public Policy Center
- GPR – (i) Ground-Penetrating Radar
- GPS – (i) General Problem Solver – Global Positioning System
- GPT – (i) GEC-Plessey Telecommunications – General Purpose Technology – Get Paid To website
- GPU
  - (i) Gosudarstvennoye Politicheskoye Upravlenie (Russian Государственное Политическое Управление, "State Political Administration") (1922–1934)
  - (i) Graphics Processor Unit

== GQ ==
- GQ
  - (s) Equatorial Guinea (ISO 3166 digram)
  - (i) Gentlemen's Quarterly (the original name of the magazine now known simply as GQ)
  - (s) Guam (FIPS 10-4 territory code)

== GR ==
- GR – (s) Greece (FIPS 10-4 country code; ISO 3166 digram) – Hail (METAR Code)
- GRAIL – (i) Gravity Recovery and Interior Laboratory
- GRAS – (i) Generally recognized as safe (FDA list)
- GRB – (i) Gamma-ray burst
- GRC – (s) Greece (ISO 3166 trigram)
- GRD – (s) Grenada (ISO 3166 trigram)
- GRE
  - (i) Graduate Record Examination
  - (s) Greece (IOC and FIFA trigram, but not ISO 3166)
- grep – (a) [search] Globally for Regular Expression, Print [lines]
- GRid – Global Release Identifier, a music industry identifier from the RIAA and IFPI
- GRID – (a) Gay-Related Immune Deficiency (original name of AIDS)
- GriT – (a) Girl raised in Texas (Woman presenting firm southern traits/beliefs)
- GRL – (s) Greenland (ISO 3166 trigram)
- GRN
  - (s) Grenada (IOC and FIFA trigram, but not ISO 3166)
  - (i) Goods received note
- grn – (s) Guaraní language (ISO 639-2 code)
- GRP – (i) Graphite-reinforced plastic, see Carbon-fiber-reinforced polymer
- GRU – (i) Glavnoje Razvedyvatel'noje Upravlenije/Главное Разведывательное Управление (Russian, "Main Intelligence Directorate" [of the former Soviet and now Russian armed forces])

== GS ==
- Gs – (s) Gigasecond
- GS
  - (i) General Schedule (US civil service pay scale)
  - General Support
  - (s) Gigasiemens
  - South Georgia and the South Sandwich Islands (ISO 3166 digram)
- GSR – (i) Gun Shot Residue
- GS-R – (i) General Support-Reinforcing
- GSA – (i) U.S. General Services Administration
- GSD – (i) Graphical Situation Display
- GSG
  - (i) German Sport Guns
  - Global Scenario Group (former environmental research organization)
  - Grenzschutzgruppe (German, "Border Guard Group" — Germany's GSG 9 counterterrorist unit was originally a special branch of the border police)
- GSGB – (God send glamour boy 9-10/10)
- GSK – (p) GlaxoSmithKline [good sexual karma]
- GSM
  - (i) General Service Medal
  - Grams per Square Metre (paper thickness; properly g/m^{2})
  - Ground Station Module
  - Groupe spécial mobile (French, "Special Mobile Group"; official expansion is now Global System for Mobile Communications)
- GSN – (a/i) Game Show Network
- GSO – (i) General Services Officer (U.S. Department of State)
- GSOH – (i) Good Sense Of Humour
- GSP – Georges St-Pierre (Canadian MMA fighter)
- GSS – (i) Generic Security Services
- GST – (i) Goods and Services Tax (Australia, Canada, and other countries)
- GSW – (i) Gunshot wound

== GT ==
- GT – (s) Gigatesla – (i) Gran Turismo – Grand Touring – (s) Guatemala (FIPS 10-4 country code; ISO 3166 digram)
- GTA – (i) Grand Theft Auto
- GTB – (i) Get to bed, namely to get a new job after a long time of searching, usually following a phone call
- GTC – (i) Gran Telescopio Canarias (Spanish, Canaries Great Telescope)
- GTD – (i) Getting Things Done
- GTFO – "Get the f**k out!"
- GTG – (i) Good To Go (Internet chat)
- GTK – (i) Good To Know (Internet chat)
- GTGN – (i) Getty Thesaurus of Geographic Names
- GTM – (s) Guatemala (ISO 3166 trigram)
- GTQ – (s) Guatemalan quetzal (ISO 4217 currency code)
- GTV – (s) Gross Tumor Volume quetzal (ISO 4217 currency code)

== GU ==
- gu – (s) Gujarati language (ISO 639-1 code)
- GU – (s) Guam (postal symbol; ISO 3166 digram)
- GUA – (s) Guatemala (IOC and FIFA trigram, but not ISO 3166)
- GUF – (s) French Guiana (ISO 3166 trigram)
- GUI – (a) Graphical user interface ("goo-ey")
- GUILT – (a) Gangliated Utrophin Immuno Latency Toxin
- guj – (s) Gujarati language (ISO 639-2 code)
- GULCR – (i) Grupo de Usuarios de Linux de Costa Rica
- Gulag – (p) Glavnoye Upravleniye ispravitelno-trudovykh LAGerei i kolonii (Russian Главное Управление Исправительно—Трудовых Лагерей и колоний, "Main Directorate of Corrective Labour Camps")
- GUM
  - (a) Glavnyi Universalnyi Magazin (Russian Главный Универсальный Магазин, "Main Department Store"; known in Soviet times as Gosudarstvennyi Universalnyi Magazin/Государственный Универсальный Магазин, "State Department Store")
  - (s) Guam (ISO 3166 trigram)
  - Guide to the expression of Uncertainty in Measurement
- GURPS - (a) Generic Universal RolePlaying System
- GUT – (a) Grand Unification Theory

== GV ==
- gv – (s) Manx language (ISO 639-1 code)
- GV – (s) Gigavolt – Guinea (FIPS 10-4 country code)

== GW ==
- GW – (i) Games Workshop – Germ Warfare – (s) Gigawatt – (i) Guided Weapon – (s) Guinea-Bissau (ISO 3166 digram)
- GWARS – (p) Ground Warfare System (simulation)
- GWAS – (p) Grand Western Archery Society
- GWOT – (i) Global War on Terrorism
- GWS – (i) Gulf War Syndrome – Greater Western Sydney

== GX ==
- GXA – (p) Global XML Web Services Architecture
- GXE – (s) Gene–environment interaction
- GXF – (p) General Exchange Format
- GXH – (i) IATA code of Gannan Xiahe Airport
- GXL – (p) Graph eXchange Language
- GXM – (p) Matrox Graphics eXpansion Module
- GXP – (p) Grid Exit Point - (i) Global Xchange Programme - (i) Indication of highest performance level on some Pontiac vehicles
- GxP – (i) Good X Practice (X can mean: clinical, manufacturing, pharmaceutical, etc.)
- GXY – (i) IATA code of Greeley-Weld County Airport

== GY ==
- GY – (s) Guyana (FIPS 10-4 country code; ISO 3166 digram)
- GYD – (s) Guyana dollar (ISO 4217 currency code)
- GYY – (s) Gary/Chicago International Airport (IATA Airport Code)

== GZ ==
- GZ – (s) Gaza Strip (FIPS 10-4 territory code) – (i) Ground Zero
- GZK – (i) Greisen-Zatsepin-Kuzmin cut-off (cosmic ray energies)
