= 1G (disambiguation) =

1G is the first-generation wireless telephone technology.

1G or 1-G may also refer to:

- Metallothionein 1G
- 1g Racing, manufacturer of the Rossion Q1 sports car
- Astra 1G, a satellite operated by SES
- SSH 1G (WA) or Washington State Route 538
- Galileo International's IATA code
- 1G, a model of Toyota G engine

== See also ==
- G-force
- Gram
- Cardiomyopathy, dilated 1G (autosomal dominant)
- G1 (disambiguation)
- G (disambiguation)
