= Shirin M. Rai =

Indian political scientist (b1960)

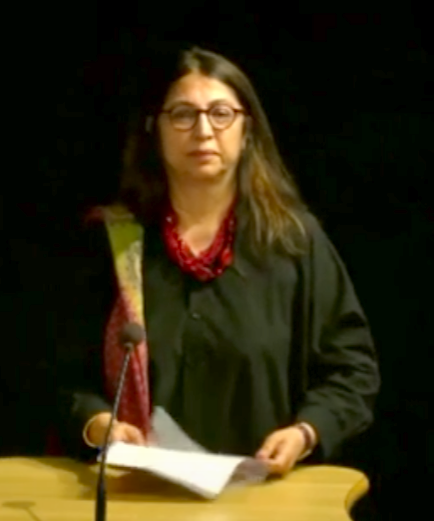
- Giving a talk at SOAS in 2024
- Born: 1 December 1960 (age 65); New Delhi, India
- Education: Delhi University; University of Cambridge
- Known for: Gender and Development; Democratization; Political Ceremony and Ritual Studies
- Scientific career
- Workplaces: University of Warwick
- Website: shirinrai.com

Shirin M. Rai FBA (born 1 December 1960) is an interdisciplinary scholar who works across the political science and international relations boundaries. She is known for her research on the intersections between international political economy, globalisation, post-colonial governance, institutions and processes of democratisation and gender regimes. She was a professor of politics and international studies at the University of Warwick, and is the founding director of Warwick Interdisciplinary Research Centre for International Development (WICID).

In July 2022, she was confirmed as the distinguished research professorship in the Department of Politics and International Relations at the School of Oriental and African Studies (SOAS), University of London. She took up her post at SOAS in September 2022.

== Biography ==
Shirin M. Rai was born in New Delhi, India and attended Modern School. After securing her BA at Hindu College, Delhi University and MA in the Department of Political Science, Delhi University, India, she carried out her doctoral research on Chinese liberalisation and educational reforms at Christ's College and Faculty of Social and Political Sciences, University of Cambridge.

Rai joined the Department of Politics and International Studies, University of Warwick as the first woman to be appointed as a full-time lecturer, in 1989 and served there until 2022. She is now distinguished research professor in SOAS, Department of Politics and International Studies.

Rai is honorary professor in the Department of Politics and International Studies, University of Warwick, visiting professor (2021 -) at the Department of Gender Studies at LSE, and an adjunct professor at Monash University.

== Research ==
Shirin M. Rai is an interdisciplinary scholar and has written extensively on issues of gender, governance and development, and politics and performance. She is the co/author of 5 monographs, has co/edited 15 volumes and has written numerous articles in high impact journals.

Rai has recently been working on issues of gendered care and work and the costs of this care work, which she (together with Catherine Hoskyns and Dania Thomas) theorised as "depletion through social reproduction". She is a Co-Investigator for the UKRI-funded Consortium on Practices for Wellbeing and Resilience in Black, Asian and Minority Ethnic Families and Communities and is using the depletion framework to study the impact of racism during COVID-19, on Care, Caring and Carers in the Midlands.

Rai has also developed an interdisciplinary framework across the social sciences/humanities boundaries – politics and performance – to study politics and political institutions. This emerged out of Rai's Leverhulme Trust programme on Gendered Ceremony and Ritual in Parliament (2007–2011), of which she was director. Building on this work Rai became interested in exploring the nature of performance in/as politics. Her recent books in this field include Performing Representation, a commentary on women MPs in the Indian Parliament, as well as co-edited the OUP Handbook of Politics and Performance.

Rai's work within feminist political economy examines gendered regimes of work and survival under globalisation, which include privatisation of natural resources, and the changing nature of work. Her books in this field are Gender and the Political Economy of Development (2002), Gender Politics of Development (2008) and New Frontiers in Feminist Political Economy (ed, with Georgina Waylen). She has also worked on questions of gender relations and their relationships to shifting patterns of economic and political governance – see Global Governance: Feminist Perspectives (2008).

Her earlier work also focused strongly on democratisation. In 2000 she edited International Perspectives on Gender and Democratization. As the acting director of the Centre for the Study of Democratisation at the University of Warwick, she (with Wyn Grant) launched a book series with Manchester University Press on Perspectives on Democratisation, which was re-launched under a new title, Perspectives on Democratic Practice, in 2007. Rai has also served on the Editorial Board of the journal Democratization.

Rai has also collaborated with the UN Women, United Nations Development Programme, United Nations Department of Economic and Social Affairs and the World Bank for consultancy work, and public speaking engagements.

Shirin M. Rai is a member of various professional societies such as the Political Studies Association, British International Studies Association and International Studies Association and has served on the Governing Council of the International Studies Association (2009–2011). She has served as co-Editor of the journal Social Politics, and is member of the editorial boards of publications such as: Indian Journal of Gender Studies, International Feminist Journal of Politics, Global Ethics and Review of International Studies.

== Honours ==
In July 2022 Rai was awarded the British International Studies Association Distinguished Contribution Award.

In 2021 Rai was a fellow of the British Academy.

In 2017, the Political Studies Association named its PhD dissertation prize for international relations the Shirin M. Rai Prize in recognition of her contributions to the discipline of feminist international relations and international political economy.

Rai received the Feminist Theory and Gender Studies Eminent Scholar Award from the International Studies Association in 2015.

In 2010 Rai was elected as a Fellow of the Academy of Social Sciences.

== Publications ==
A detailed list of Rai's publications can be found here. A selection of her works is listed below:

=== Authored books ===
- Rai, Shirin (1991). Resistance and reaction: university politics in post-Mao China. Hemel Hempstead, Hertfordshire New York, New York: Harvester Wheatsheaf St. Martin's Press. ISBN 9780312071875.
- Rai, Shirin; Christiansen, Flemming (1996). Chinese politics and society : an introduction. London New York: Prentice Hall/Harvester Wheatsheaf. ISBN 9780133546569.
- Rai, Shirin (2002). Gender and the political economy of development: from nationalism to globalization. Malden, Massachusetts: Polity Press. ISBN 9780745614915.
- Rai, Shirin M. (2008). The gender politics of development essays in hope and despair. New Delhi London New York New York: Zed Books. ISBN 9781842778388.
- Rai, Shirin; Spary, Carole (2019). Performing Representation: Women Members in the Indian Parliament (First ed.). New Delhi: Oxford University Press. ISBN 978-0-19-909386-1. OCLC 1090373358.

=== Edited books ===
- Rai, Shirin; Pilkington, Harry; Phizacklea, Annie (1992). Women in the face of change: the Soviet Union, Eastern Europe, and China. London New York: Routledge. ISBN 9780415075411.
- Rai, Shirin; Griffin, Gabriele; Roseneil, Sasha; Hester, Marianne (1994). Stirring it: challenges for feminism. London Bristol, Pennsylvania: Taylor & Francis. ISBN 9780748402137.
- Rai, Shirin; Lievesley, Geraldine (1996). Women and the state: international perspectives. London Bristol, Pennysylvania: Taylor & Francis. ISBN 9780748403615.
- Rai, Shirin; Fine, Robert (1997). Civil society: democratic perspectives. London Portland, Oregon: F. Cass. ISBN 9780714643137.
- Rai, Shirin (2000). International perspectives on gender and democratisation. New York: St. Martin's Press. ISBN 0-333-75004-7. OCLC 42960536.
- Rai, Shirin; Cohen, Robin (2000). Global social movements. London New Brunswick, New Jersey Somerset, New Jersey: Athlone Press / Transaction Publishers. ISBN 9780485006155.
- Rai, Shirin; Parpart, Jane; Staudt, Kathleen A. (2003). Rethinking empowerment gender and development in a global/local world. London New York: Routledge. ISBN 9780415277693.
- Rai, Shirin; Newell, Peter; Scott, Andrew (2002). Development and the challenge of globalization. London: ITDG. ISBN 9781853394928.
- Rai, Shirin (2003). Mainstreaming gender, democratizing the state? Institutional mechanisms for the advancement of women. Manchester New York: Manchester University Press. ISBN 9780719059780.
- Rai, Shirin; Waylen, Georgina (2008). Global Governance: Feminist Perspectives. Basingstoke: Palgrave Macmillan. ISBN 978-0-230-53704-0. OCLC 213600531.
- The OUP Handbook of Performance and Politics (lead editor, with Milija Gluhovic, Silvija Jestrovic and Michael Saward), New York, Oxford University Press, 2020
- The Grammar of Performance and Politics (with Janelle Reinelt), London, Routledge, 2015 (Interventions Series)
- Rai, Shirin; Waylen, Georgina, eds. (2013). New Frontiers in Feminist Political Economy. New York: Routledge. ISBN 978-1-134-64913-6. OCLC 863157533.
- Democracy in Practice: Ceremony and Ritual in Parliaments (eds. with Rachel E. Johnson), Basingstoke, Palgrave Macmillan, 2014
- Ceremony and Ritual in Parliament, London: Routledge, 2010

=== Articles ===
- Rai, Shirin M. (February 1993). "Gender, education and employment in Post-Mao China: issues in modernisation". China Report. 29 (1): 1–14. doi:10.1177/000944559302900101. S2CID 153572383.
- Rai, Shirin M. (January 2003). "Networking across borders: South Asian Research Network (SARN) on gender, law and governance". Global Networks. 3 (1): 59–74. doi:10.1111/1471-0374.00050.
- Rai, Shirin M.; Barwa, Sharmistha (March 2003). "Knowledge and/as power: a feminist critique of trade related intellectual property rights". Gender, Technology and Development. 7 (1): 91–113. doi:10.1177/097185240300700105.
- Rai, Shirin M. (2004). "Gendering global governance" (PDF). International Feminist Journal of Politics. 6 (4): 579–601. doi:10.1080/1461674042000283345. S2CID 144402273.
- Rai, Shirin M.; Baxi, Pratiksha; Ali, Shaheen Sardar (2006). "Legacies of common law: 'crimes of honour' in India and Pakistan". Third World Quarterly. 27 (7): 1239–1253. doi:10.1080/01436590600933404. S2CID 144689933.
- Rai, Shirin M.; Hoskyns, Catherine (September 2007). "Recasting the global political economy: counting women's unpaid work". New Political Economy. 12 (3): 297–317. doi:10.1080/13563460701485268. S2CID 153695625.
- Rai, Shirin M. (November 2007). "Deliberative democracy and the politics of redistribution: the case of the Indian Panchayats" (PDF). Hypatia: A Journal of Feminist Philosophy. 22 (4): 64–80. doi:10.1111/j.1527-2001.2007.tb01320.x. S2CID 145678923.
- Rai, Shirin M. (September 2010). "Analysing ceremony and ritual in parliament". The Journal of Legislative Studies. 16 (3): 284–297. doi:10.1080/13572334.2010.498098. S2CID 144015579.
- Rai, Shirin M.; Bedford, Kate (Autumn 2010). "Feminists theorize international political economy". Signs: Journal of Women in Culture and Society. 36 (1): 1–18. doi:10.1086/652910. S2CID 144937391.
- Rai, Shirin M.; Madhok, Sumi (Spring 2012). "Agency, injury and transgressive politics in neoliberal times" (PDF). Signs: Journal of Women in Culture and Society. 37 (3): 645–669. doi:10.1086/662939. S2CID 28864241.
- Rai, Shirin M.; Hoskyns, Catherine; Thomas, Dania (2014). "Depletion: the cost of social reproduction". International Feminist Journal of Politics. 16 (1): 86–105. doi:10.1080/14616742.2013.789641. S2CID 214653272. Pdf. from Center for the Study of Globalization and Regionalization, Warwick University.
- "From Depletion to Regeneration: Addressing Structural and Physical Violence in Post-Conflict Economies" (2020)
- "Feminist everyday political economy: Space, time, and violence" (2019)
- "SDG 8: Decent work and economic growth- A gendered analysis" (with Benjamin D. Brown and Kanchana N. Ruwanpura) (2019) World Development 113, 368–380
- "Upendra Baxi: feminism, law, and the human" (2018), Jindal Global Law Review, Volume 9 Number 2 DOI 10.1007/s41020-018-0078-y
- "Feminist everyday political economy: Space, time, and violence" (with Juanita Elias) (2018), Review of International Studies doi:10.1017/S0260210518000323
- "The Good Life and the Bad: The Dialectics of Solidarity" (March 2018) Social Politics: International Studies in Gender, State & Society Volume 25, Issue 1 Pages 1–19
- "Recognising the full costs of care? The Gendered Politics of Compensation for families in South Africa's silicosis class action" (with Beth Goldblatt) (November 2017), Social and Legal Studies DOI: 10.1177/0964663917739455
- "Political Performance: A Framework for Analyzing Democratic Politics" (2014)
