= Morris Schuring =

Dutch racing driver (born 2005)

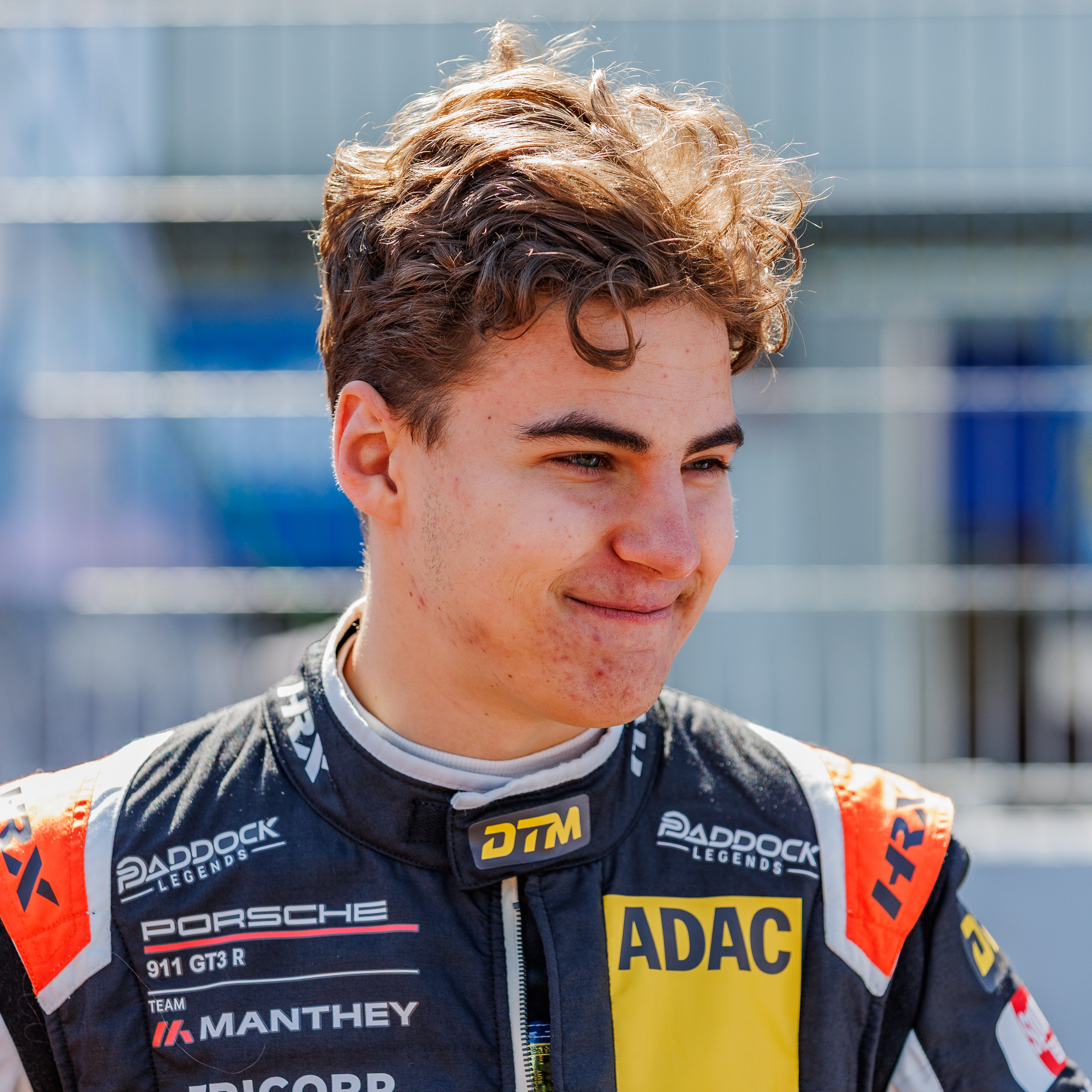
- Schuring in 2025
- Nationality: (Netherlands) Dutch
- Born: 20 February 2005 (age 21) Den Dolder, Netherlands
- Relatives: Gerwin Schuring (father); Flynt Schuring (brother)

Porsche Supercup career
- Debut season: 2021
- Current team: Fach Auto Tech
- Categorisation: FIA Silver (until 2024); FIA Gold (2025–)
- Former teams: GP Elite, Huber Racing
- Starts: 19 (19 entries)
- Wins: 2
- Podiums: 2
- Poles: 2
- Fastest laps: 1
- Best finish: 4th in 2023

Morris Schuring (born 20 February 2005) is a Dutch racing driver currently competing in the LMGT3 category of the FIA World Endurance Championship with Manthey EMA. He is notable for being part of the first line-up to win the LMGT3 class at the 24 Hours of Le Mans race in 2024.

== Career ==
=== Debut & Porsche Cups ===
Schuring started racing in go-karts, moving into car racing in 2020 by driving in the BMW M240i Cup. The following year saw him progress to the Porsche Carrera Cup Germany series with GP Elite, for whom he would score a lone podium finish at the Hockenheimring, to finish eighth in the standings. During 2020, he also made his debut in the Porsche Supercup, and in 2022 combined participating in that series again with a campaign in the Porsche Carrera Cup Germany. Although he would only manage a best result of seventh in the 2022 Supercup, he improved in the Carrera Cup, finishing sixth in the championship with a maiden pole at the Red Bull Ring and a total of three podium finishes.

Schuring got his first race win in motorsports in the 2021–22 Porsche Sprint Challenge Middle East, where he was also runner-up to the overall winner with five wins, two pole positions, five fastest laps, and seven podium finishes over the ten races.

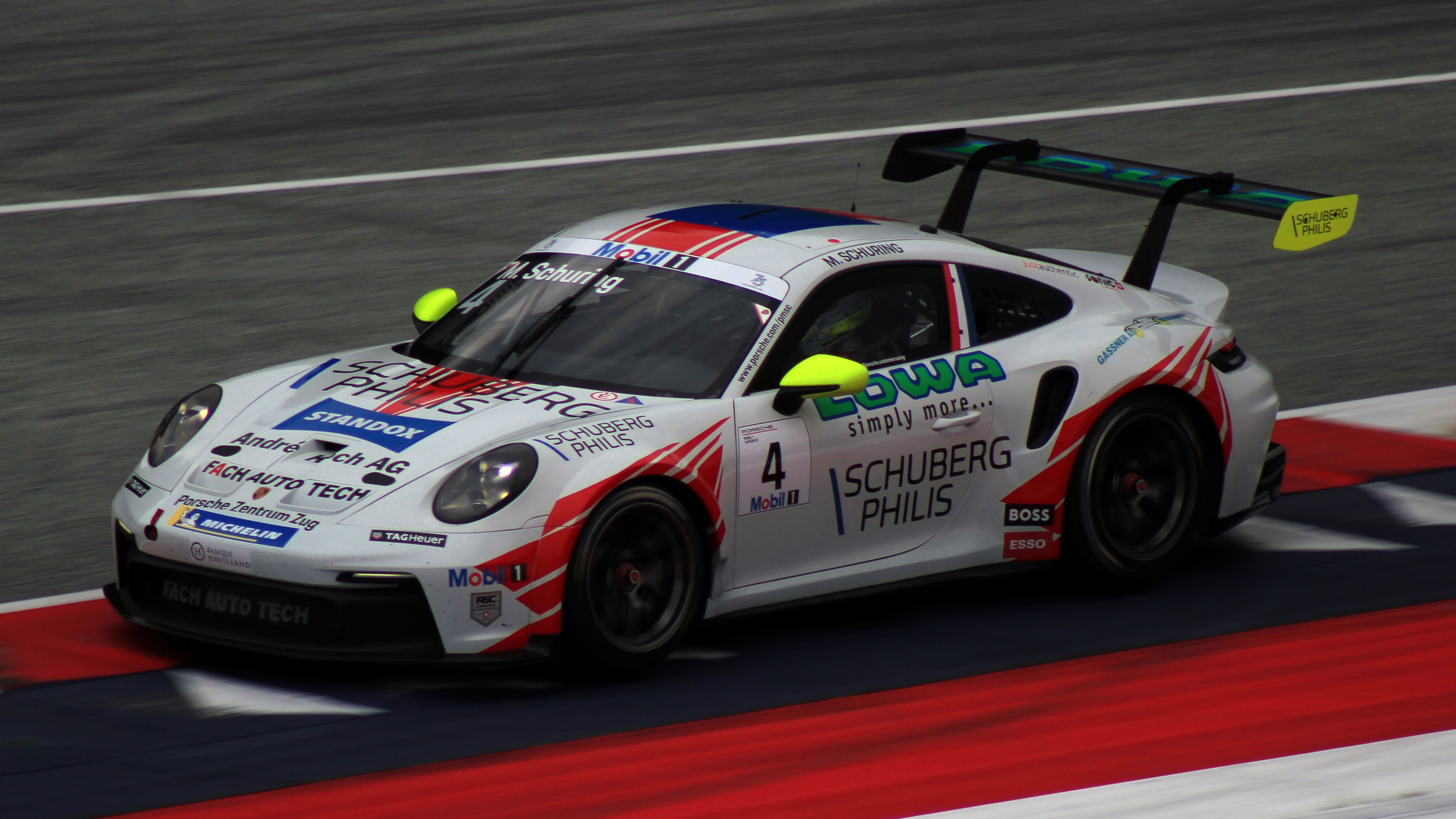
Schuring at the Red Bull Ring in 2023

In 2023, after moving to Fach Auto Tech, Schuring participated in the Supercup and the Carrera Cup again. This season bore fruit for Schuring, who became the youngest ever winner in the Carrera Cup's history at the Sachsenring. He also impressed in the main series, leading from lights to flag at Spa and similarly dominated the subsequent race, his home event at Circuit Zandvoort. He finished fourth in the points standings.

=== GT3 class ===
==== 2024 ====
After making his GT3 debut in the final weekend of the Asian Le Mans Series at the beginning of 2024, Schuring moved into the newly formed LMGT3 class in the FIA World Endurance Championship, partnering Richard Lietz and Yasser Shahin at Manthey EMA. After a pair of races in which they earned no points, the trio came out on top in a rain-affected race in Belgium, with Lietz taking the lead on the final lap. However, their crowning achievement came at Le Mans, where a strong performance delivered Schuring and his teammates the class victory, making the 19-year-old Dutchman one of the youngest ever Le Mans winners.

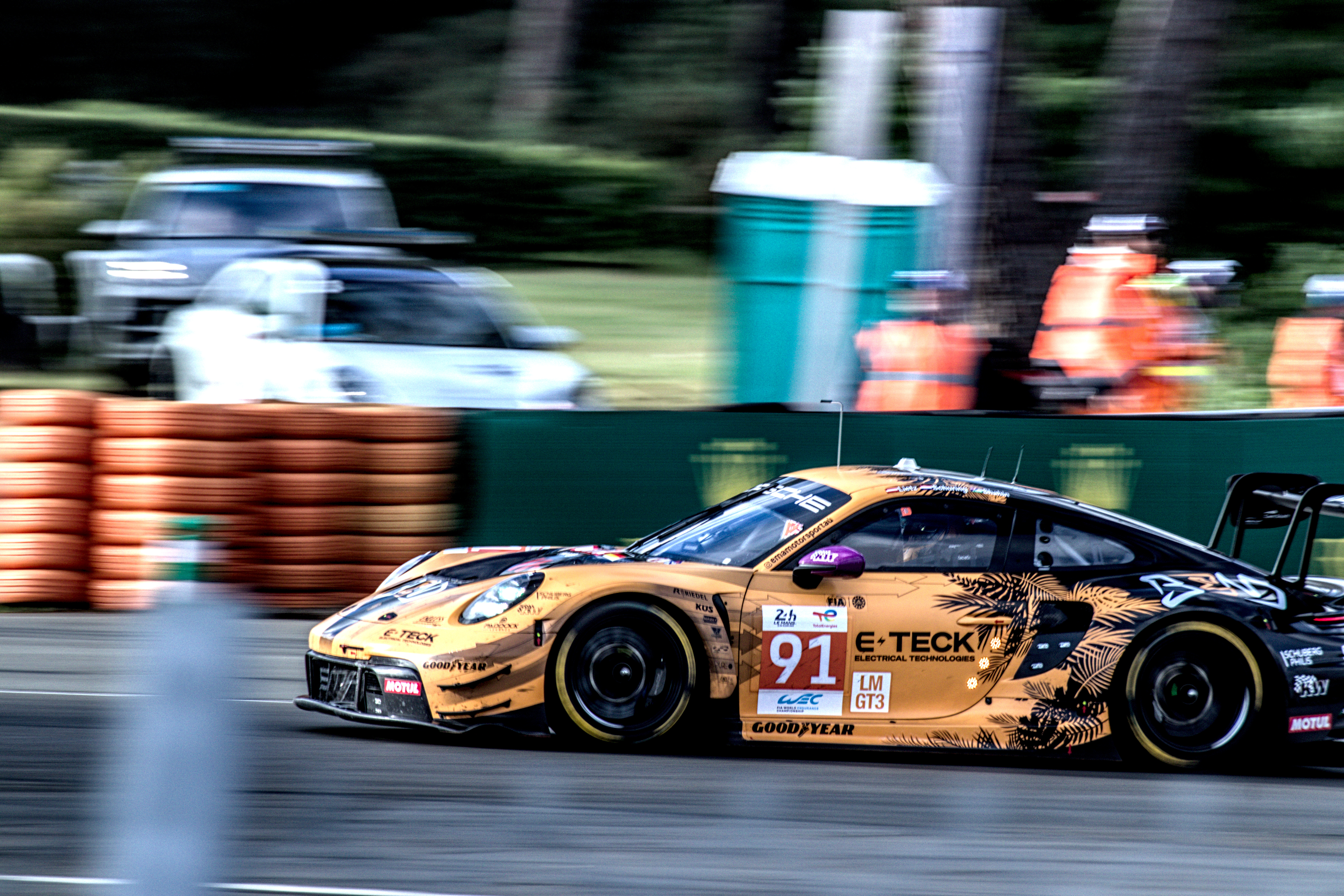
Schuring, alongside co-drivers Lietz and Shahin, took the LMGT3 class victory during the 2024 24 Hours of Le Mans

The remainder of the season was inconsistent, with Schuring scoring no points in the 6 Hours of São Paulo or the 6 Hours of Fuji, and between São Paulo and Fuji only managed a third-place finish at the Lone Star Le Mans, the team's best result of the latter half of their campaign. They ended their season with a fifth place at the 8 Hours of Bahrain and finished the drivers' championship in the runner-up position with 105 points.

Also in 2024, Schuring made his debut in the 2024 GT World Challenge Europe Endurance Cup with Herberth Motorsport, driving in the Bronze Cup alongside Ralf Bohn and Robert Renauer. The first round at Le Castellet brought in points, but the rest of the campaign was plagued by retirement and a DNS ("Did Not Start") at Monza Circuit. The team's best finish was a fourth place in their category in the final round of the championship at the Jeddah Corniche Circuit, resulting in them finishing 18th in the championship with 21 points.

==== 2025 ====
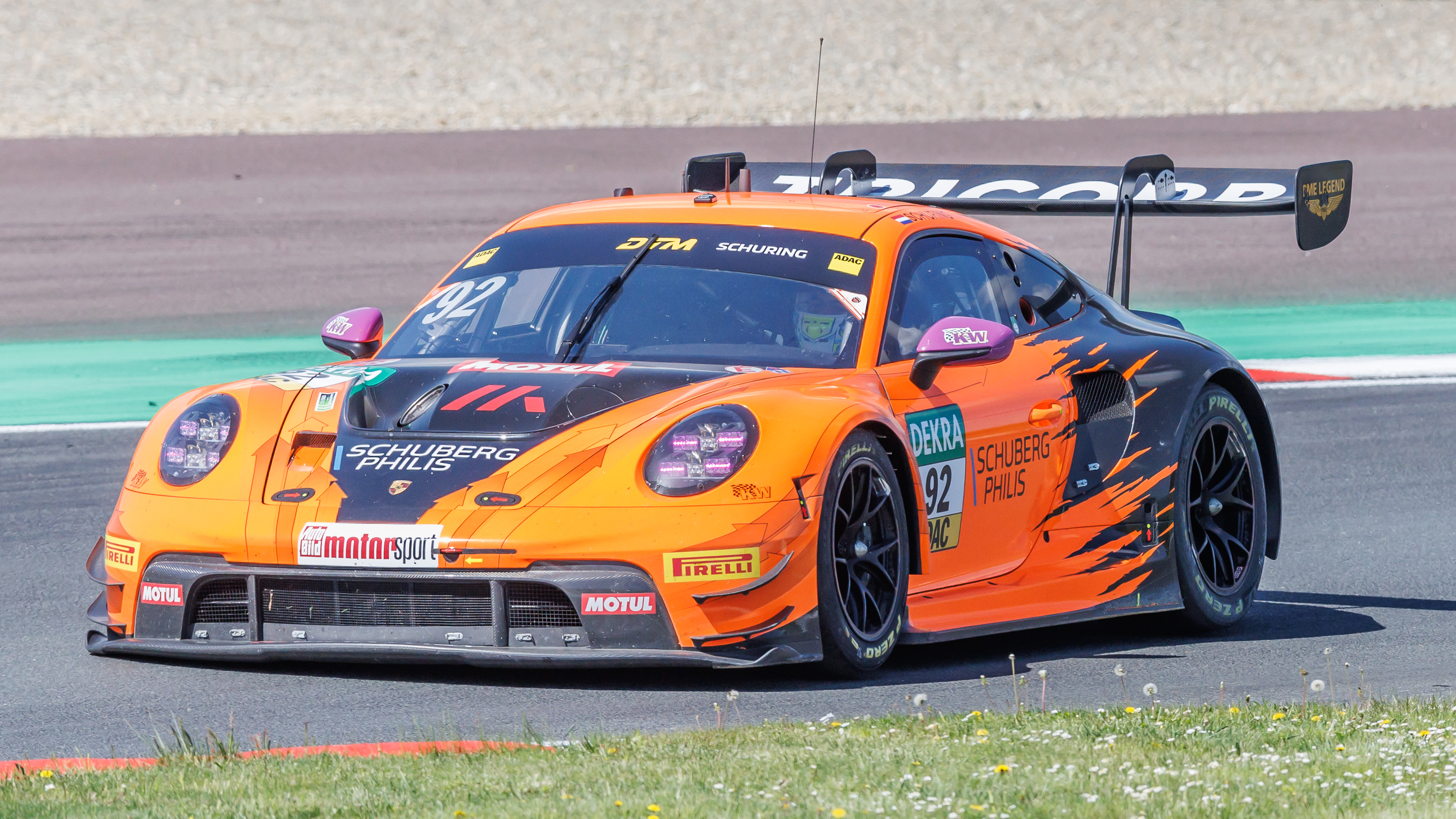
Schuring made his DTM debut at Oschersleben in 2025

In 2025, Schuring made his debut in the Deutsche Tourenwagen Masters with Manthey Junior Team. He took the sole podium of his campaign in the first race of the final round at the Hockenheimring and won the DTM rookies title.

He also took part in the 2025 GT World Challenge Europe Endurance Cup with Rutronik Racing, primarily competing in the Bronze class – except at Monza, where he made his Pro debut with Schumacher CLRT, his highlight of the season was winning the final round at Circuit de Barcelona-Catalunya.

==== 2026 ====
Schuring contested 2026 IMSA SportsCar Championship – GTD class for the first time with Manthey 1st Phorm, partnering Ryan Hardwick and Riccardo Pera. Their best race was in the final round at the 2026 Petit Le Mans, where they scored their first podium.

He also did a dual campaign in the GT World Challenge Europe Endurance Cup and the GT World Challenge Europe Sprint Cup both in the Pro class with Belgian outfit Boutsen VDS and partnering Alessio Picariello and Dorian Boccolacci. In the latter he achieved two podiums total, one in the opening round at Brands Hatch, and the other, alongside a pole position, at his home track in Zandvoort. In the former, his best result came in the final round at Algarve, where he grabbed his first pole position and converted it to his first podium in the category.

== Karting record ==
=== Karting career summary ===
Season	Series	Team	Position
2019	BNL Karting Series - Junior Max		18th
2019	Rotax Max Challenge Euro Trophy - Junior		10th
2020	Rotax Max Euro Challenge - Senior	JJ Racing	27th
2020	Rotax Max Euro Winter Cup - Senior	JJ Racing	
2020	Rotax Max Challenge International Trophy - Senior Max		32nd

== Racing record ==
=== Racing career summary ===
Season	Series	Team	Races	Wins	Poles	F/Laps	Podiums	Points	Position
2020	BMW M240i Cup	DayVTec	?	?	?	?	?	?	?
2021	Porsche Carrera Cup Germany	Team GP Elite	16	0	0	0	1	109	8th
2021	Porsche Supercup	GP Elite	3	0	0	0	0	0	NC†
2021–22	Porsche Sprint Challenge Middle East	BWT Junior Racing	10	5	2	5	7	157.5	**2nd**
2022	Porsche Supercup	Huber Racing	8	0	0	0	0	33	13th
2022	Porsche Carrera Cup Germany	SSR Huber Racing	16	0	1	0	3	161	6th
2022	24H GT Series – 992	Red Camel-Jordans.nl	1	0	0	0	1	24	5th
2023	Porsche Supercup	Fach Auto Tech	8	2	2	1	2	103	4th
2023	Porsche Carrera Cup Germany	Fach Auto Tech	16	1	1	1	3	181	5th
2023–24	Asian Le Mans Series - GT	Herberth Motorsport	2	0	0	0	0	11	20th
2024	FIA World Endurance Championship – LMGT3	Manthey EMA	8	2	0	0	3	105	**2nd**
2024	24 Hours of Le Mans – LMGT3	Manthey EMA	1	1	0	0	1	N/A	**1st**
2024	GT World Challenge Europe Endurance Cup	Herberth Motorsport	4	0	0	0	0	0	NC
2024	GT World Challenge Europe Endurance Cup – Bronze	Herberth Motorsport	4	0	0	0	0	21	18th
2024	Nürburgring Langstrecken-Serie – Cup2	Black Falcon	1	0	0	0	0	0	NC†
2024	Nürburgring Langstrecken-Serie – Cup3	Black Falcon	1	0	0	0	0	0	NC†
2024	24 Hours of Nürburgring – Cup2 Pro	Black Falcon Team 48 LOSCH	1	0	1	0	0	N/A	9th
2025	Deutsche Tourenwagen Masters	Manthey Junior Team	16	0	0	0	1	58	16th
2025	GT World Challenge Europe Endurance Cup	Rutronik Racing	4	0	0	0	0	8	20th
2025	GT World Challenge Europe Endurance Cup	Schumacher CLRT	1	0	0	0	0	8	20th
2025	GT World Challenge Europe Endurance Cup – Bronze	Rutronik Racing	4	1	0	1	1	41	9th
2025	Nürburgring Langstrecken-Serie – SP9	Falken Motorsports	2	1	0	0	2		NC†
2025	24 Hours of Nürburgring - SP9	Falken Motorsports	1	0	0	0	0	N/A	DNF
2026	IMSA SportsCar Championship – GTD	Manthey 1st Phorm	4	0	0	0	1	839	41st
2026	Nürburgring Langstrecken-Serie – SP9	Falken Motorsports							
2026	24 Hours of Nürburgring - SP9	Falken Motorsports	1	0	0	0	0	N/A	DNF
2026	GT World Challenge Europe Endurance Cup	Boutsen VDS	5	0	1	0	1	35	6th
2026	GT World Challenge Europe Sprint Cup	Boutsen VDS	6	0	1	1	2	25	13th
2026	Le Mans Cup - GT3	High Class Racing	1	0	0	0	0	0	NC†
2026	GT World Challenge America - Pro	Wright Motorsports	1	0	0	0	0	0	NC†

^{†} As Schuring was a guest driver, he was ineligible for points.

^{*} Season still in progress.

=== Complete Porsche Carrera Cup Germany results ===
(key) (Races in bold indicate pole position; Races in italics indicate fastest lap)

Year	Team	1	2	3	4	5	6	7	8	9	10	11	12	13	14	15	16	DC	Points
2021	Team GP Elite	SPA; 1 Ret	SPA; 2; 10	OSC; 1; 5	OSC; 2; 7	RBR; 1 Ret	RBR; 2; 17	MNZ1; 1; 8	MNZ1; 2; 16	ZAN; 1; 6	ZAN; 2; 7	MNZ2; 1 Ret	MNZ2; 2; 5	SAC; 1; 6	SAC; 2; 10	HOC; 1; 3	HOC; 2; 4	8th	109
2022	SSR Huber Racing	SPA; 1; 5	SPA; 2; 2	RBR; 1; 5	**RBR**; **2**; 2	IMO; 1; 5	IMO; 2; 9	ZAN; 1 Ret	ZAN; 2 Ret	NÜR; 1; 6	NÜR; 2; 4	LAU; 1; 7	LAU; 2; 4	SAC; 1; 3	SAC; 2; 7	HOC; 1 Ret	HOC; 2; 6	6th	161
2023	Fach Auto Tech	SPA; 1 DSQ	SPA; 2; 3	HOC; 1; 4	HOC; 2; 10	ZAN; 1; 12	ZAN; 2; 7	NÜR; 1; 5	NÜR; 2; 5	LAU; 1; 5	LAU; 2; 4	**SAC**; **1**; 2	SAC; 2; 1	RBR; 1; 13	RBR; 2; 4	HOC; 1; 4	HOC; 2; 4	5th	181

=== Complete Porsche Supercup results ===
(key) (Races in bold indicate pole position; races in italics indicate fastest lap)

Year	Team	1	2	3	4	5	6	7	8	Pos.	Points
2021	GP Elite	MON	RBR	RBR	HUN; 8	SPA; 18	ZND; 18	MNZ	MNZ	NC†	0
2022	Huber Racing	IMO; 14	MON; 13	SIL; 13	RBR; 9	LEC; 7	SPA; 16	ZND; 9	MNZ; Ret	13th	33
2023	Fach Auto Tech	MON; 6	RBR; 19	SIL; 9	HUN; 7	**SPA**; 1	**ZND**; 1	ZND; 4	MNZ; 5	4th	103

=== Complete Asian Le Mans Series results ===
(key) (Races in bold indicate pole position; races in italics indicate fastest lap)

Year	Team	Class	Car	Engine	1	2	3	4	5	Pos.	Points
2023–24	Herberth Motorsport	GT	Porsche 911 GT3 R (992)	Porsche M97/80 4.2 L Flat-6	SEP; 1	SEP; 2	DUB	ABU; 1; 5	ABU; 2; 10	20th	11

=== Complete FIA World Endurance Championship results ===
(key) (Races in bold indicate pole position; races in italics indicate fastest lap)

Year	Entrant	Class	Chassis	Engine	1	2	3	4	5	6	7	8	Rank	Points
2024	Manthey EMA	LMGT3	Porsche 911 GT3 R (992)	Porsche M97/80 4.2 L Flat-6	QAT; 15	IMO; 16	SPA; 1	LMS; 1	SÃO; 12	COA; 3	FUJ; 14	BHR; 5	2nd	105

=== 24 Hours of Le Mans results ===
Year	Team	Co-Drivers	Car	Class	Laps	Pos.	Class Pos.
2024	(Germany) Manthey EMA	(Austria) Richard Lietz (Australia) Yasser Shahin	Porsche 911 GT3 R (992)	LMGT3	281	27th	**1st**

=== Complete GT World Challenge Europe results ===
==== GT World Challenge Europe Endurance Cup ====
(Races in bold indicate pole position; races in italics indicate fastest lap)

Year	Team	Car	Class	1	2	3	4	5	6	7	Pos.	Points
2024	Herberth Motorsport	Porsche 911 GT3 R (992)	Bronze	LEC; 28	SPA; 6H; 32	SPA; 12H; Ret	SPA; 24H; Ret	NÜR; DNS	MNZ; Ret	JED; 27	18th	21
2025	Rutronik Racing	Porsche 911 GT3 R (992)	Bronze	LEC; 39		SPA; 6H; 66	SPA; 12H; 57	SPA; 24H; 45	NÜR; 35	CAT; 12	9th	41
2025	Schumacher CLRT	Porsche 911 GT3 R (992)	Pro		MNZ; 6						20th	8
2026	Boutsen VDS	Porsche 911 GT3 R (992.2)	Pro	LEC; 11	MNZ; 4	SPA; 6H; 7	SPA; 12H; 15	SPA; 24H; 8	NÜR; 12	**ALG**; 3	6th	35

==== GT World Challenge Europe Sprint Cup ====
(Races in bold indicate pole position; races in italics indicate fastest lap)

Year	Team	Car	Class	1	2	3	4	5	6	7	8	9	10	Pos.	Points
2026	Boutsen VDS	Porsche 911 GT3 R (992.2)	Pro	BRH; 1; 2	BRH; 2; 12	MIS; 1; 27	MIS; 2; 18	MAG; 1	MAG; 2	**ZAN**; **1**; 2	ZAN; 2; 11	CAT; 1	CAT; 2	13th	25

=== Complete Deutsche Tourenwagen Masters results ===
(key) (Races in bold indicate pole position; races in italics indicate fastest lap)

Year	Team	Car	1	2	3	4	5	6	7	8	9	10	11	12	13	14	15	16	Pos	Points
2025	Manthey Junior Team	Porsche 911 GT3 R (992)	OSC; 1; 16	OSC; 2; 17	LAU; 1 Ret	LAU; 2; 11	ZAN; 1; 5	ZAN; 2; 11	NOR; 1; 14	NOR; 2; 12	NÜR; 1 Ret	NÜR; 2; 12	SAC; 1; 17	SAC; 2; 7	RBR; 1; 19	RBR; 2; 14	HOC; 1; 3	HOC; 2; 14	16th	58

=== Complete IMSA SportsCar Championship results ===
(key) (Races in bold indicate pole position; races in italics indicate fastest lap)

Year	Entrant	Class	Car	Engine	1	2	3	4	5	6	7	8	9	10	Pos.	Points
2026	Manthey 1st Phorm	GTD	Porsche 911 GT3 R (992.2)	Porsche M97/80 4.2 L Flat-6	DAY; 12	SEB; 19	LBH	LGA	WGL	MOS	ELK; 16	VIR	IMS	PET; 2	41st	839
