= GDS =

GDS may refer to:

== Organisations ==
- German Dharmaduta Society, a Buddhist organisation in Germany
- Group for Social Dialogue (Romanian: Grupul pentru Dialog Social), a Romanian human rights organisation
- Groupe de Développement Sportif, Canada's national motorsport authority
- Guide Dogs Singapore, Singaporean non-profit organization for the blind

=== Government and politics ===
- Citizens' Democratic Party (Bosnian: Građanska Demokratska Stranka), a political party in Bosnia and Herzegovina
- Government Digital Service, a unit of the UK Government's Department for Science, Innovation and Technology
- UK Government Decontamination Service

=== Schools ===
- Georgetown Day School, in Washington, D.C., US
- Greensboro Day School, in North Carolina, US

== Science and technology ==
- Global Dialing Scheme, a numbering plan for H.323 audio-visual communication networks
- Goal Decision System, in association football
- Graph dynamical system
- Geriatric Depression Scale

=== Computing ===
- Gather Data Sampling, the Downfall security vulnerability
- .gds (for Graphic Design System), a filename extension for GDSII files
- Global distribution system
- Google Desktop Search

== Other uses ==
- Gaelic Digital Service, in Scotland
- Game Developers Session, an annual conference
- Ghandruk Sign Language
- GDS, sister station of GTS

== See also ==
- GD (disambiguation)
