= GML =

GML may refer to:

== Computing ==
- Game Maker Language, the scripting language of Game Maker
- Generalized Markup Language, a set of macros for the IBM text formatter, SCRIPT
- Generative Modelling Language, an extension of PostScript used for the concise description of complex 3D shapes
- Geography Markup Language, an XML grammar to express geographical features
- Graffiti Markup Language, an XML-based file format that stores graffiti motion data
- Graph Modelling Language, a hierarchical ASCII-based file format for describing graphs

== Other uses ==
- Canadian Gold Maple Leaf, a gold bullion coin
- Gilmala Halt railway station (station code), in Pakistan
- GML Heritage, an Australian heritage consultancy firm
- Hostomel Airport (IATA code), in Ukraine
- Gradient multilayer nanofilm, a nanomaterial
- Grand Medal of Lotus Flower, an honour of Macau
- Guardian Media Limited, a Trinidadian media company
- Middle Low German (ISO 639-3 code), a formerly used European language
- Glycerol monolaurate, a naturally occurring antimicrobial agent, also called Monolaurin
