= GW =

GW may refer to:

== Arts, entertainment and media ==
=== Gaming ===
- Games Workshop, a British manufacturer of miniature wargames (founded 1975)
- Guild Wars, an episodic series of online role-playing games (from 2005)
- Plants vs. Zombies: Garden Warfare, an online third-person shooter game (from 2014)

=== Periodicals ===
- GateWorld, a Stargate fan news blog (published from 1999)
- Gazeta Wyborcza, a Polish newspaper (from 1989)
- Gesamtkatalog der Wiegendrucke, a German catalogue of incunabula (from 1925)
- Golden Words, a Canadian satirical student newspaper (from 1967)

=== Other uses in arts and entertainment ===
- Ghost Whisperer, a CBS television series (ran 2005–2010)
- Ghostwriter, someone hired to author texts credited to another

== Calendar ==
- Golden Week (Japan), a period containing a number of holidays

== Places ==
- Guinea-Bissau (ISO 3166 country code)
- Gawok railway station, Indonesia (station code)
- George Washington Bridge, Hudson River, New York, U.S.
- George Washington University, in Washington, D.C., U.S.
  - George Washington University Hospital

== Science, technology and mathematics ==
=== Physics ===
- GW approximation, an estimate of a many-body electron system's self-energy
- Gigawatt (GW), a unit for measuring power—equal to 10^{9} watts
- Gravitational waves, ripples in the curvature of spacetime that propagate as waves
  - The prefix on names of gravitational wave observations

=== Other uses in science, technology and mathematics ===
- Game week, a fixture shorthand used in sports such as Fantasy football (association)
- .gw, the Internet top-level domain of Guinea-Bissau
- GW-BASIC, a Microsoft dialect of the BASIC programming language
- Global warming, the ongoing climatic event
- Gromov–Witten invariant, in symplectic topology
- Grothendieck–Witt ring, of a mathematical field
- GW, the human gene MASTL

== People with the initials GW ==
- George Washington (1732–1799), first president of the United States
- Gene Wilder (1933–2016), American actor and comedian
- George W. Bush (born 1946), forty-third president of the United States

== See also ==
- Gateway (disambiguation)
- George Washington (disambiguation)
- Ghostwriter (disambiguation)
- Goo (disambiguation)
- GU (disambiguation)
