= GI =

GI, G.I. or Gi may refer to:

== Military ==
- G.I., a nickname for U.S. Army soldiers that has been explained as an abbreviation for various different expressions
- Government issued, a class of equipment produced for government use and one of the explanations for the above term

== Sports ==
- Gymnastics Ireland, a governing body
- Greg Inglis (born 1987), Australian rugby league footballer
- Keikogi (Japanese: 稽古着, lit. 'practice clothes'), a Japanese martial arts uniform known in English simply as a gi

== Arts and entertainment ==
- GI (album), an album by the Germs
- Gi (Captain Planet character)
- Game Informer, a magazine
- Gert's Inferno, a comic book series
- Global Icon (band), a South Korean group
- Genshin Impact, an action role-playing gacha game developed by miHoYo

== Language, geography, and transportation ==
- Gi (kana), a syllabic character in Japanese script
- Gi (cuneiform), a sign in cuneiform writing
- Gi (digraph), one of several digraphs
- Goethe-Institut, a German cultural association
- Guaranteed Irish, a business membership network
- Geographical indication, on products that come from a geographical location or origin
- Gibraltar (ISO 3166-1 code GI), a disputed British Overseas Territory in the Iberian Peninsula
- Government Issue, an American punk band
- Guduvancheri railway station (Indian Railways code GI), in Chennai, Tamil Nadu, India
- Itek Air (IATA code GI), a 1999–2010 airline based in Kyrgyzstan

== Science and technology ==
- Galvanized iron, a kind of metal

=== Biology and medicine ===
- G_{i} alpha subunit, a part of some proteins
- Gastrointestinal tract (GI tract), the main part of the digestive system
- Gigantocellular reticular nucleus (Gi), a subregion of the medullary reticular formation
- Glycemic index, a measure of a food's effect on blood glucose
- Gender incongruence

=== Computing ===
- GI, a complexity class in the graph isomorphism problem
- .gi, the ccTLD for Gibraltar
- Gi (prefix symbol) (gibi), a binary prefix
- Global illumination, a group of 3D graphics algorithms

==== Computing organizations ====
- General Instrument, an American electronics company that specializes in manufacturing semiconductors and cable television equipment
- German Informatics Society (Gesellschaft für Informatik), a German professional society for computer science
- Graphics Interface, a conference on computer graphics and human–computer interaction

== See also ==
- G.I. Generation (or Greatest Generation), a demographic cohort
- G.I. Joe (disambiguation)
- G1 (disambiguation)
- GL (disambiguation)
