= GFY =

GFY may refer to:

- Golgi-associated olfactory signaling regulator, the protein encoded by the human GFY gene
- Grootfontein Air Force Base, IATA code GFY
- GFY Press, an independent publisher
- "GFY", a 2022 song by Blackbear and Machine Gun Kelly from In Loving Memory
- "GFY", a 2019 song by Amyl and the Sniffers from their titular album
- An initialism for "Go fuck yourself"
