= Graphics Interface =

The Graphics Interface (GI) conference is the oldest continuously scheduled conference devoted to computer graphics, and human–computer interaction. GI was held biannually between 1969 and 1981, and has been held annually since then. Prior to 1982, the conference was called Canadian Man-Computer Communications Conference (CMCCC).

This conference is sponsored by the Canadian Human–Computer Communications Society. The conference has a tradition of being co-located with the Canadian Conference on Artificial Intelligence (AI), and the Canadian Conference on Computer and Robot Vision (CRV), which was formerly known as Vision Interface (VI).

== Awards ==
The Canadian Human–Computer Communications Society honours the memory of Michael A. J. Sweeney through an annual award to the best student paper presented at each year's Graphics Interface conference.

Alain Fournier and Bill Buxton Ph.D. Dissertation Annual Awards are given to best dissertations in Computer Graphics and Human-Computer Interaction defended in a Canadian University, and are announced officially during the Graphics Interface conference.

Conference	Michael A. J. Sweeney Award in HCI	Michael A. J. Sweeney Award in Graphics
GI 2014	Ahmed Sabbir Arif, Michel Pahud, Ken Hinckley, and Bill Buxton. Experimental study of stroke shortcuts for a touchscreen keyboard with gesture-redundant keys removed.	Oskar Elek, Tobias Ritschel, Carsten Dachsbacher, and Hans-Peter Seidel. Interactive light scattering with principal-ordinate propagation
GI 2013	Michael Glueck, Tovi Grossman, and Daniel Wigdor. A model of navigation for very large data views.	Ali Mahdavi Amiri and Faramarz Samavati. ACM: atlas of connectivity maps for semiregular models.
GI 2012	Mona Haraty, Diane Tam, Shathel Haddad, Joanna McGrenere, and Charlotte Tang. Individual differences in personal task management: a field study in an academic setting.	Cyrus Rahgoshay, Amir Rabbani, Karan Singh, and Paul G. Kry. Inverse kinodynamics: editing and constraining kinematic approximations of dynamic motion.
GI 2011	Robert Xiao, Miguel A. Nacenta, Regan Mandryk, Andy Cockburn, and Carl Gutwin. Ubiquitous cursor: a comparison of direct and indirect pointing feedback in multi-display environments.	Hua Li and David Mould. Structure-preserving stippling by priority-based error diffusion.
GI 2010	Manuela Waldner, Werner Puff, Alexander Lex, Marc Streit, and Dieter Schmalstieg. Visual links across applications.	Jean-Paul Balabanian, Ivan Viola, and Eduard Gröller. Interactive illustrative visualization of hierarchical volume data.
GI 2009	Kenrick Kin, Maneesh Agrawala, and Tony DeRose. Determining the benefits of direct-touch, bimanual, and multifinger input on a multitouch workstation.	Ke Colin Zheng, Alex Colburn, Aseem Agarwala, Maneesh Agrawala, David Salesin, Brian Curless, and Michael F. Cohen. Parallax photography: creating 3D cinematic effects from stills.
GI 2008	Jason Alexander and Andy Cockburn. An empirical characterisation of electronic document navigation.	Takashi Ijiri, Mihoshi Yokoo, Saneyuki Kawabata, and Takeo Igarashi. Surface-based growth simulation for opening flowers.
GI 2007	Carman Neustaedter, A. J. Bernheim Brush, and Saul Greenberg. A digital family calendar in the home: lessons from field trials of LINC.	--
GI 2006	Celine Latulipe, Ian Bell, Charles L. A. Clarke, and Craig S. Kaplan. symTone: two-handed manipulation of tone reproduction curves.	Hai Mao and Yee-Hong Yang. Particle-based immiscible fluid-fluid collision.
GI 2005	Xiang Cao and Ravin Balakrishnan. Evaluation of an on-line adaptive gesture interface with command prediction.	--
GI 2004	Julie Heiser, Doantam Phan, Maneesh Agrawala, Barbara Tversky, and Pat Hanrahan. Identification and validation of cognitive design principles for automated generation of assembly instructions.	Wilmot Li, Maneesh Agrawala, and David Salesin. Interactive image-based exploded view diagrams.

== Venues ==
Conference	Location	Dates	Year	Program Co-Chairs	Notes
GI 2024	Halifax, Nova Scotia	3 June–6 June	2024	Mayra Barrera Machuca, Brandon Haworth, Joseph Malloch	
GI 2023	Victoria, British Columbia	30 May–2 June	2023	Charles Perin, KangKang Yin	
GI 2022	Montreal, Quebec	17 May–19 May	2022	Deborah Fels, Sheldon Andrews	
GI 2021	Vancouver, British Columbia	27 May–28 May	2021	Manolis Savva, Ahmed Sabbir Arif	
GI 2020	Toronto, Ontario	21 May–22 May	2020	Alec Jacobson, Fanny Chevalier	
GI 2019	Kingston, Ontario	28 May–31 May	2019	Andrea Tagliasacchi, Rob Teather	
GI 2017	Victoria, British Columbia	31 May–3 June	2016	Christopher Batty, Derek Reilly	
GI 2017	Edmonton, Alberta	17 May - 19 May	2017	Elmar Eisemann, Scott Bateman	
GI 2016	Victoria, British Columbia	31 May–3 June	2016	Tibi Popa, Karyn Moffatt	
GI 2015	Halifax, Nova Scotia	3–5 June	2015	Hao (Richard) Zhang, Tony Tang	
GI 2014	Montreal, Quebec	7–9 May	2014	Paul G. Kry, Andrea Bunt	
GI 2013	Regina, Saskatchewan	29–31 May	2013	Farmarz F. Samavati, Kirstie Hawkey	
GI 2012	Toronto, Ontario	28–30 May	2012	Stephen Brooks, Kirstie Hawkey	
GI 2011	St. John's, Newfoundland	25–27 May	2011	Stephen Brooks, Pourang Irani	
GI 2010	Ottawa, Ontario	31 May-2 June	2010	David Mould, Sylvie Noel	
GI 2009	Kelowna, British Columbia	24–27 May	2009	Amy Gooch, Melanie Tory	
GI 2008	Windsor, Ontario	28–30 May	2008	Chris Shaw, Lyn Bartram	
GI 2007	Montreal, Quebec	28–30 May	2007	Christopher G. Healy, Edward Lank	
GI 2006	Quebec, Quebec	7–9 June	2006	Stephen Mann, Carl Gutwin	
GI 2005	Victoria, British Columbia	9–11 May	2005	Michiel van de Panne, Kori Inkpen	
GI 2004	London, Ontario	17–19 May	2004	Wolfgang Heidrich, Ravin Balakrishnan	
GI 2003	Halifax, Nova Scotia	11–13 June	2003	Torsten Möller, Colin Ware	
GI 2002	Calgary, Alberta	27–29 May	2002	Michael McCool, Wolfgang Stuerzlinger	
GI 2001	Ottawa, Ontario	7–9 June	2001	Benjamin Watson, John W. Buchanan	
GI 2000	Montréal, Québec	15–17 May	2000	Pierre Poulin, Sidney Fels	
GI '99	Kingston, Ontario	2–4 June	1999	I. Scott MacKenzie, James Stewart	
GI '98	Vancouver, B.C.	18–20 June	1998	Alain Fournier, Kelly Booth	
GI '97	Kelowna, B.C.	21–23 May	1997	V. Klassen, M. Mantei	
GI '96	Toronto, Ontario	22–24 May	1996	Richard Bartels, Wayne A. Davis	
GI '95	Québec, Québec	17–19 May	1995	Przemyslaw Prusinkiewicz	
GI '94	Banff, Alberta	18–20 May	1994	B. Joe	
GI '93	Toronto, Ontario	19–21 May	1993	Tom Calvert	
GI '92	Vancouver, British Columbia	11–15 May	1992	Colin Ware	
GI '91	Calgary, Alberta	3–7 June	1991	Eugene Fiume	
GI '90	Halifax, Nova Scotia	14–18 May	1990	Brian Wyvill	
GI '89	London, Ontario	19–23 June	1989	M. Wein	
GI '88	Edmonton, Alberta	6–10 June	1988	D. Peachey	
GI '87 (GI + CHI)	Toronto, Ontario	5–9 April	1987	J. Caroll, P. Tanner	
GI '86	Vancouver, B.C.	26–30 May	1986	M. Green	
GI '85	Montréal, Québec	27–31 May	1985	Daniel Thalmann	
GI '84	Ottawa, Ontario	28 May-1 June	1984	J. Raymond	
GI '83	Edmonton, Alberta	9–13 May	1983	Wayne A. Davis	
GI '82	Toronto, Ontario	17–21 May	1982	Bill Buxton, Alain Fournier	
7th CMCCC	Waterloo, Ontario	10–12 June	1981	P. Tanner	
6th CMCCC	Ottawa, Ontario	29–30 May	1979	J. Norton	
5th CMCCC	Calgary, Alberta	26–27 May	1977	Wayne A. Davis	
4th CMCCC	Ottawa, Ontario	26–27 May	1975	T. Shepertychi	
3rd CMCCC	Ottawa, Ontario	30–31 May	1973	M. Ito	
2nd CMCCC	Ottawa, Ontario	31 May-1 June	1971		
1st CMCCC	Ottawa, Ontario		1969		
