= GTA =

GTA or gta may refer to:

== Arts and entertainment ==
- Grand Theft Auto, a series of video games by Rockstar Games
  - Grand Theft Auto (video game), the original 1997 game
  - Grand Theft Auto Advance (2004), also known as Grand Theft Auto
- Grand Theft Auto (film), 1977, directed by Ron Howard
- Grand Text Auto, a game studies blog by Nick Montfort
- Grand Theft Audio, a British rock band
- Good Times Ahead (GTA), an American electronic music duo
- "GTA", a song by Emilia from her 2023 album, .MP3
- "GTA", a song by Future and Metro Boomin from their 2024 album We Don't Trust You

== Languages ==
- Gtaʼ language, spoken in India
- Guató language, spoken in Brazil (ISO 639-3 code: gta)

== Places ==
- Gorkhaland Territorial Administration, a semi-autonomous region in India
- Grande Traversée des Alpes, a hiking trail in France
- Grande Traversata delle Alpi, a hiking trail in Italy
- Greater Tokyo Area, a metropolitan area in Japan
- Greater Toronto Area, a metropolitan area in Southern Ontario, Canada
- Goleta station, California, US (Amtrak code: GTA)
- Great Ayton railway station, England (National Rail code: GTA)

== Science and technology ==
- Gas tungsten arc welding
- Gene transfer agent, a DNA-containing particle produced by some bacteria
- Global Technology Associates, an Internet firewall maker
- GTA, a codon for the amino acid valine
- GTA Teleguam, a telecommunications company in Guam

== Vehicles ==
=== Alfa Romeo ===
- Alfa Romeo GTA, a succession of Italian sport coupés (1965–1975) based on the Giulia
- 147 GTA, a high-performance version of the Alfa Romeo 147
- 156 GTA, a high-performance version of the Alfa Romeo 156
- MiTo GTA, a concept version of the Alfa Romeo MiTo

=== Others ===
- Grand theft auto, a type of crime; see motor vehicle theft
- GTA Motor, a Spanish automobile designer and manufacturer
- GTA Motor Competición, a Spanish racing team
- GTA MyCar, an electric vehicle originally produced by EuAuto Technology based in Hong Kong
- Pontiac Firebird Trans Am GTA, an American coupé (1987–1992)
- Renault Alpine GTA, a French coupé (1986–1991)
- Renault GTA, a performance version of the subcompact Renault Alliance

== Other uses ==
- Gerakan Tanah Air, a Malaysian coalition
- Golden Ticket Awards, an award ceremony for theme parks
- Graduate teaching assistant, a graduate student employed on a temporary contract by a department at a college or university in teaching-related responsibilities
- Grow the Army, a transformation and restationing initiative of the U.S. Army
- GTA gang, the nickname given to a violent gang of murderers and terrorists located near Moscow, Russia
