= GSM (disambiguation) =

GSM (Global System for Mobile communications) is a family of standards for 2G digital cellular networks.

GSM may also refer to:

== Businesses and organizations ==
- GSM London, formerly Greenwich School of Management, a former higher education provider in England
- Ginebra San Miguel, a subsidiary of San Miguel Corporation
- Glass Sport Motors, a former South African motor manufacturer
- Graduate Studies in Mathematics, a series of textbooks by the American Mathematical Society
- Green SM, a taxi and ridesharing company in Vietnam

== Military ==
- Garrison sergeant major, in the British Army
- General Service Medal (disambiguation), several campaign medals
- Gas turbine system technician (mechanical), a US Navy rating

== Places ==
- Church of St Mary the Great, Cambridge, or Great St Mary's, England
- Għajnsielem, Gozo Island, Malta, postal code GSM

== Transportation ==
- Flyglobespan, a former airline based in Scotland, ICAO code GSM
- Qeshm International Airport, Qeshm Island, Iran, IATA code GSM

== Other uses ==
- Genitourinary syndrome of menopause, in medicine
- Grams per square metre (g/m^{2}), a measure of paper density, or grammage
- GSM, a wine term for a Grenache–Syrah–Mourvèdre blend
- Guatemalan Sign Language, ISO 639 code gsm

== See also ==
- Sexual and gender minorities
