= GNQ =

GNQ or gnq may refer to:

- GNQ, the ISO 3166-1 alpha-3 code for Equatorial Guinea
- GNQ, the Indian Railways station code for Godhani railway station, Maharashtra, India
- GNQ, the Pakistan Railways station code for Gandi Khan Khel railway station, Pakistan
- gnq, the ISO 639-3 code for Ganaʼ language, Sabah, Malaysia
