= GEMA =

Gema or GEMA may refer to:

== Organizations ==
- GEMA (German organization), a performance rights organisation in Germany
- Gema Records (Gema), a Cuban record label founded by Álvarez Guedes and others in 1957
- Gas and Electricity Markets Authority (GEMA) in the United Kingdom
- Gikuyu, Embu, and Meru Association (GEMA), a Kenyan organisation
- Gemmological Association of Great Britain (Gem-A), a gemmology education and qualifications body based in the UK
- Georgia Emergency Management Agency (GEMA)

== Companies ==
- Global Engine Manufacturing Alliance (GEMA), an engine-manufacturing joint venture between Chrysler, Hyundai Motors and Mitsubishi Motors
- Gesellschaft für elektroakustische und mechanische Apparate (GEMA), which produced radar equipment for the Kriegsmarine during World War II

== Others ==
- Gema (given name)
- Gema, Zamora, a town in Spain
- Gema, a Di Gi Charat character
- Gema, a general purpose macro processor
- The Japanese name for Ladja (Dragon Quest)

== See also ==
- Gemma (disambiguation)
