= GNF =

GNF may refer to:

== Music ==
- Give No Fxk, a song by Migos ft. Young Thug & Travis Scott
- GNF (OKOKOK), a song by Polo G

== Sports ==
- Botola, or GNF 1, Moroccan football league division 1
- Botola 2, or GNF 2, Moroccan football league division 2

== Transport ==
- Gandalf Airlines, a defunct Italian airline
- Gansner Field, an airport in California, United States
- Greenfield railway station, in Greater Manchester, England
- Grenada Municipal Airport, in Mississippi, United States

== Other uses ==
- GeorgeNotFound, an English internet personality
- Greibach normal form
- Guinean franc, the currency of Guinea
