= Guj (disambiguation) =

Guj or GUJ may refer to:

- Guz, an obsolete Indian unit of length
- Gujarat, a state in western India
  - Gujarat Airways, a former airline in India
  - Gujarati language, an Indo-Aryan language spoken in Gujarat, India
