= Graffiti Markup Language =

XML-based file format

Graffiti Markup Language (GML) is an XML-based file format that stores graffiti motion data that was created by Jamie Wilkinson, Chris Sugrue, Theo Watson and Evan Roth. Popular applications such as Graffiti Analysis, EyeWriter and Mozilla's Firefox MarkUp implement GML. GML is the product of collaboration between artists, hackers, and programmers, and may be used to replicate graffiti using robots.

GML won an Open Web Award in 2011.
