= GRD =

GRD or Grd may refer to:

== Economics and commerce ==
- Global depository receipt
- Global resources dividend
- Modern drachma, ISO-4217 code for the former currency of Greece

== Transportation ==
- Giridih railway station, in Jharkhand, India
- Greenwood County Airport, in South Carolina, United States
- Group Racing Developments, a British racing car manufacturer

== Other uses ==
- Game Research/Design, a defunct American game publisher
- Gastroesophageal reflux disease
- Glasgow Roller Derby, in Scotland
- Gradian, a unit of angular measurement
- Grdeša (c. 1120–1180), Serbian noble
- GRD Limited, an Australian holding company
- Guruntum language, spoken in Nigeria
