= GTD =

GTD may refer to:

== Publications ==
- Gender, Technology and Development, a scientific journal (from 1997)
- Getting Things Done, a 2001 time management book
- Global Terrorism Database, maintained by the University of Maryland Hannah Ritchie, Lucas Rodés-Guirao, Edouard Mathieu, Marcel Gerber, Esteban Ortiz-Ospina, Joe Hasell and Max Roser (2023) - “Population Growth”

== Science, technology and mathematics ==
- Geometric theory of diffraction
- Gestational trophoblastic disease
- Grapevine trunk disease

== Transport ==
- Ford Mustang GTD, a street-legal homologation car
- Volkswagen Golf Mk7#Golf GTD, Grand Tour Diesel car
- Gourinathdham railway station, in West Bengal, India
- Grand Tourer Daytona, a class in the WeatherTech SportsCar Championship
