= GTM =

GTM may refer to:

== Places ==
- Guatemala, a country in Central America
- Golden Triangle Mall, a shopping mall in Texas, United States
- Grampian Transport Museum, a museum in Alford, Aberdeenshire
- Greater Manchester, a ceremonial county in North West England

== Science, technology, and mathematics ==
- GoToMeeting, online meeting and desktop sharing software
- Graduate Texts in Mathematics, a series of mathematics textbooks published by Springer-Verlag
- Generative topographic map, a machine learning method
- Global Traffic Manager, a load balancing module for some F5 Networks appliances
  - Global Server Load Balancing
- Google Tag Manager, a tag management system built by Google
- Greystone Technology M, a schema-less transactional database
- Large Millimeter Telescope (Spanish: Gran Telescopio Milimétrico), the world's largest millimetric telescope, located in Mexico

== Vehicles ==
- Gross Ton Mile, the product of total weight (including the weight of lading cars and locomotives) and the distance moved by a train or other vehicle
- Gross Trailer Mass, the portion of the mass of a fully laden trailer that is carried by the wheels
- GT-M, a Soviet tracked military vehicle
  - GT-MU, a command and control variant
- GTM Cars, a former UK-based kit car manufacturer from 1967 to 2022
- GTM Supercar Factory Five Racing

== Other uses ==
- Bureau of Global Talent Management, an agency in the United States Department of State
- Go-to-market, a strategy to approach the market with a new product or service
- Grammar–translation method, a method of language teaching
- Greentech Media, a media and research company that covered the green technology market
- Groovin' the Moo, an annual music festival held at various regional centres across Australia during the middle of the year
- Great Translation Movement, a Chinese online movement
- Ghana–Togo Mountain languages, a group of Kwa languages spoken in the mountains of the Ghana–Togo borderland
