= Gwas =

GWAS may refer to:

- Genome-wide association study, study of mutations' correlations with disease or other phenotypic expressions
- gwas, a Welsh term for a valet
- Great Western Ambulance Service, the ambulance service serving Somerset, Gloucestershire and Wiltshire.
- An online gaming abbreviation for "Game was a success".
