= MASTL =

Protein-coding gene in humans

Identifiers
- Aliases: MASTL, GREATWALL, GW, GWL, MAST-L, THC2, hGWL, microtubule associated serine/threonine kinase like
- External IDs: OMIM: 608221; MGI: 1914371; GeneCards: MASTL
Enzyme activity
EC #	BRENDA	ExPASy	KEGG	MetaCyc
2.7.11.1	↗	↗	↗	↗

Gene location (Human)
Chr.	Chromosome 10 (human)
Band	10p12.1	Start	27,154,824 bp
Band	10p12.1	End	27,187,953 bp

Gene location (Mouse)
Chr.	Chromosome 2 (mouse)
Band	2|2 A3	Start	23,005,618 bp
Band	2|2 A3	End	23,046,036 bp
RNA expression pattern
Bgee	Human / Mouse (ortholog); Top expressed in: secondary oocyte; ventricular zone; gonad; amniotic fluid; ganglionic eminence; Achilles tendon; testicle; pancreatic epithelial cell; skin of arm; cartilage tissue / Top expressed in: zygote; secondary oocyte; primary oocyte; lumbar spinal ganglion; tail of embryo; genital tubercle; otic placode; epiblast; otic vesicle; epithelium of small intestine; More reference expression data
BioGPS	n/a
Gene ontology
Molecular function	transferase activity; nucleotide binding; protein kinase activity; kinase activity; protein phosphatase 2A binding; ATP binding; protein serine/threonine kinase activity
Cellular component	cytoplasm; centrosome; microtubule organizing center; cleavage furrow; cytoskeleton; nucleus; nucleoplasm
Biological process	intracellular signal transduction; phosphorylation; female meiosis II; regulation of cell cycle; cellular response to DNA damage stimulus; cell division; protein phosphorylation; G2/M transition of mitotic cell cycle; peptidyl-serine phosphorylation; cell cycle; negative regulation of phosphoprotein phosphatase activity; mitotic cell cycle; positive regulation of ubiquitin protein ligase activity
Sources:Amigo / QuickGO
Orthologs
Databases	NCBI: entry; OMA: entry
Species	Human	Mouse
Entrez	84930	67121
Ensembl	ENSG00000120539	ENSMUSG00000026779
UniProt	Q96GX5	Q8C0P0
RefSeq (mRNA)	NM_001172303; NM_001172304; NM_032844; NM_001320756; NM_001320757 NM_001372029; NM_001372030	NM_025979
RefSeq (protein)	NP_001165774; NP_001165775; NP_001307685; NP_001307686; NP_116233 NP_001358958; NP_001358959	NP_080255
Location (UCSC)	Chr 10: 27.15 – 27.19 Mb	Chr 2: 23.01 – 23.05 Mb
PubMed search
- Wikidata
View/Edit Human	View/Edit Mouse

Serine/threonine-protein kinase greatwall, also called microtubule associated serine/threonine kinase like, is an enzyme that in humans is encoded by the MASTL gene. This gene is also known as GW, GWL, THC2, MAST-L, GREATWALL.

Micro-tubule-associated serine/threonine protein kinase is a mammalian enzyme which was first discovered in Drosophila as an essential kinase (great wall) for correct chromosome condensation and mitotic progression. The EC number for this enzyme is 2.7.11.12. This enzyme is active during mitotic division and is mainly localized in the nucleus during interphase. They get dispersed into the cytoplasm upon the degradation of nuclear envelope during mitosis. The MASTL depleted cells are delayed by RNAi in G2 phase and show a decreased condensation of the chromosomes. RNAi cells which pass through the mitosis, might not get separated into their sister chromatids in anaphase. This causes the chromatin to be trapped in the cleavage furrow and form 4N G1 cells due to cytokinesis failure. This enzyme enhances the cyclin B1-Cdk1-dependent mitotic phosphorylation events during mitosis.

Although Mastl kinase is not essential for metaphase entry, it is required for its maintenance by sustaining spindle assembly checkpoint signaling. Suppression of protein phosphatase 2A activity by Mastl/Arpp19/ENSA pathway leads to sustained high level of Cdk1 substrate phosphorylation until anaphase. It also provides the timely activation of APC/C during Meiosis I and Cdk1 reactivation in meiosis II.

Mutation in the gene

A missense mutation in the MASTL gene can lead to an autosomal dominant inherited thrombocytopenia. The mutation is due to the change in amino acid glutamic acid at 167 to aspartic acid. Common phenotype of a mild thrombocytopenia patient is the decrease average plate counts of 60,000 platelets per ml of blood.

Uses in the therapeutic field

MASTL enzyme is also used for therapeutic applications such as cancer progression and tumor recurrence after free cancer therapy and this enzyme can be of higher value in the therapeutic market.
