= G1 =

G1, G01, G.I, G-1, or G One may refer to:

== Science, technology, and mathematics ==
=== Astronomy ===
- Globular cluster Mayall II
- YGKOW G1, a giant elliptical galaxy that lensed the Twin Quasar
- G1 star, a subclass of G-class stars
- G1, a cloud that passed by Sagittarius A* around 2001–2002
- g1, temporary designation of minor planet 2014 PN70, a New Horizons flyby candidate

=== Biology and medicine ===
- G1, an informal group of fossil bird eggs from the Gobi desert that were later named Gobioolithus minor
- G1 phase, in the cellular cycle
- G1 regulatory sequence for the insulin gene
- Ganesha (psychedelic) (also known as G-1 or Ganesha-1), an amphetamine psychedelic
- ATC code G01 Gynecological antiinfectives and antiseptics, a subgroup of the Anatomical Therapeutic Chemical Classification System

=== Chemistry ===
- Group 1 of the periodic table, consisting of hydrogen and the alkali metals

=== Computing and electronics ===
- Garbage-first collector, of the Oracle HotSpot Java virtual machine
- G1, in ISO 2022 character sets, one of 4 groups of characters that may be swapped into the encoding space via control codes
- Unitree G1, a humanoid robot from Unitree Robotics
- T-Mobile G1, the first publicly available Android smartphone

==== Cameras ====
- Contax G1, a Rangefinder camera made by Contax
- DSC-G1, a 2007 Sony Cyber-shot G series camera model
- PowerShot G1, a Canon camera
- Panasonic Lumix DMC-G1, a digital camera made by Panasonic

=== Mathematics ===
- g_{1}, the start of a sequence of power towers such that g_{64} is Graham's number

== Military ==
- Ordnance QF 25 pounder (South African Army designation: G1)
- G-1 (submarine), a class of early-20th century submarines constructed by the Lake Torpedo Boat Company of Bridgeport, Connecticut and purchased by the US Navy
- Char G1, a French tank
- G1, the designation used by the West German and Turkish armies for the FN FAL rifle
- G.I, a German designation for several World War I heavy bombers:
  - AEG G.I
  - Albatros G.I, a German aircraft whose development was the Albatros G.II 1916 aircraft
  - Friedrichshafen G.I
  - Gotha G.I
  - Hansa-Brandenburg G.I, a 1916 bomber aircraft
- Fokker G.I, a 1937 Dutch heavy twin-engined fighter plane
- G-1 military flight jacket, a type of flight jacket
- Kampfgeschwader 55 (historic Geschwaderkennung code G1), with the Luftwaffe in World War II

== Transportation ==
- G1 licence, the first tier in the graduated licensing programme for Ontario's new drivers
- G1 Aviation G1, French ultralight aircraft
- G1 Beijing–Harbin Expressway, in China
- Alfa Romeo G1, a 1921 Italian car
- Gorkha Airlines (IATA airline designator)
- One of the G-series Toronto subway cars
- SEPTA Route 15, All Stops service pattern labelled G1

== Arts and media ==
- G1 (website), a Brazilian news portal owned by Grupo Globo
- G.One (character), the protagonist of 2011 super hero movie Ra.One
- Gangwon No.1 Broadcasting, a Seoul Broadcasting System television channel in Gangwon Province
- Godzilla Minus One, a 2023 kaiju film often abbreviated to G–1
- Transformers: Generation 1, a toy line which ran from 1984 to 1992
  - The Transformers (TV series), an animated television series meant to promote the toy line (popularly referred to as Generation 1)

== Other uses ==
- G1 Climax, an annual professional wrestling singles tournament held by New Japan Pro Wrestling
- G1 Group, a Scottish hospitality and leisure operator

== See also ==
- Group 1 (disambiguation)
- 1G (disambiguation)
- G (disambiguation)
- GI (disambiguation)
- Gone (disambiguation)
