= GFW =

GFW or GfW may refer to:

== Entertainment ==
- Games for Windows, a defunct Microsoft brand (2006–2013)
  - Games for Windows: The Official Magazine (2006–2008)
- Global Force Wrestling, an American wrestling promotion (founded 2014)
- Great Fairy Wars, a 2010 video game in the Touhou Project series
- Impact Wrestling, an American wrestling promotion (branded GFW during 2017)

== Organisations ==
- GFW Schools, a school district in Minnesota, US (formed 1987)
- Ghana Federation of Women (1953–1960)
- Global Forest Watch, Providing tools for global forest protection efforts (launched 2014)
- Global Fund for Women (founded 1987)
- Society for Space Research (German: Gesellschaft für Weltraumforschung (GfW)), German Aerospace Center predecessor (1948–1972)

== Other uses ==
- Global Fishing Watch, website launched 2016
- Global Forest Watch, web app launched 2014
- Great Firewall, China's Internet regulations
- Grand Falls-Windsor, Newfoundland and Labrador, Canada
