= GN =

GN may refer to:

== Businesses and organizations ==
- Air Gabon (IATA code: GN), an airline based in Libreville, Gabon
- GamersNexus, a YouTube channel
- Gendarmerie Nationale (disambiguation), any of several national police forces
- Gente Nueva, a Mexican criminal organization
- GN Store Nord, a Danish manufacturer
- GN (car), a British car company operating from 1910 to 1925
- Great Northern Railway (U.S.), a railway that ran from St. Paul to Seattle
- Guardia Nacional (disambiguation), a national guard or military in some Latin American nations
- Gioventù Nazionale (GN), youth wing of the Italian Brothers of Italy (FdI) party

== Music ==
- G. N. (album), a 1981 album by Gianna Nannini
- GN (album), a 2017 album by Ratboys

== Places ==
- Guinea (ISO country code: GN), a nation in West Africa
  - .gn, the Internet top-level domain for Guinea

== Science and technology ==
- G-N (drug), a psychedelic-related chemical compound
- Gauss-Newton, an algorithm in statistics
- GeneNetwork, database and analysis software for systems genetics
- Giganewton, a unit of force in physics
- Glomerulonephritis, a medical condition
- gn, a meta-build system for Ninja
- Graduate nurse
- Grain (unit), a unit of mass
- Ground Network, former name of Near Earth Network
- Guide number, for an electronic camera flash
- Suzuki GN series, a range of motorcycles
- Gastronorm, standard of professional kitchenware sizes

== Other uses ==
- Gastronorm sizes, a set of food storage containers based on EN 631 standard
- Gn (digraph), a two-character combination in various languages
- Guarani language (ISO 639-1 code "gn")
- gn, abbreviation for guinea, a former British coin and currency unit
- Graphic novel
