= GH =

Gh or GH may refer to:

== Businesses, organizations and facilities ==
- Gästrike-Hälsinge nation, a student society at Uppsala University, Sweden
- GitHub, a hosting platform for code and software projects
- Globus Airlines (IATA:GH)
- Good Humor, a brand of ice cream
- Grubhub, an American online food delivery platform
- Grantham Hospital, a hospital in Wong Chuk Hang, Hong Kong
- Iron Guard (Argentina) (Spanish: Guardia de Hierro), a socialist organisation

== Entertainment ==
- Guitar Hero, a video game series
  - Guitar Hero (video game), the first in the series
- General Hospital, an American daytime medical drama

== Science and technology ==
- .gh, Ghana's Internet top-level domain
- Gigahenry, an SI unit of electrical inductance
- Growth hormone, a hormone which stimulates growth and cell reproduction in humans and other animals
- DGH Degrees of general hardness (properly dGH or °GH, but sometimes written simply GH)

== Other uses ==
- gh (digraph), in language
- Howard GH, an American WWII transport and utility plane
- Ghana (ISO 3166-1 country code:GH)
- GH, a suspect in the assassination of Olof Palme
