= Gema, Spain =

Coordinates: 41.418°N 5.650°W

Gema
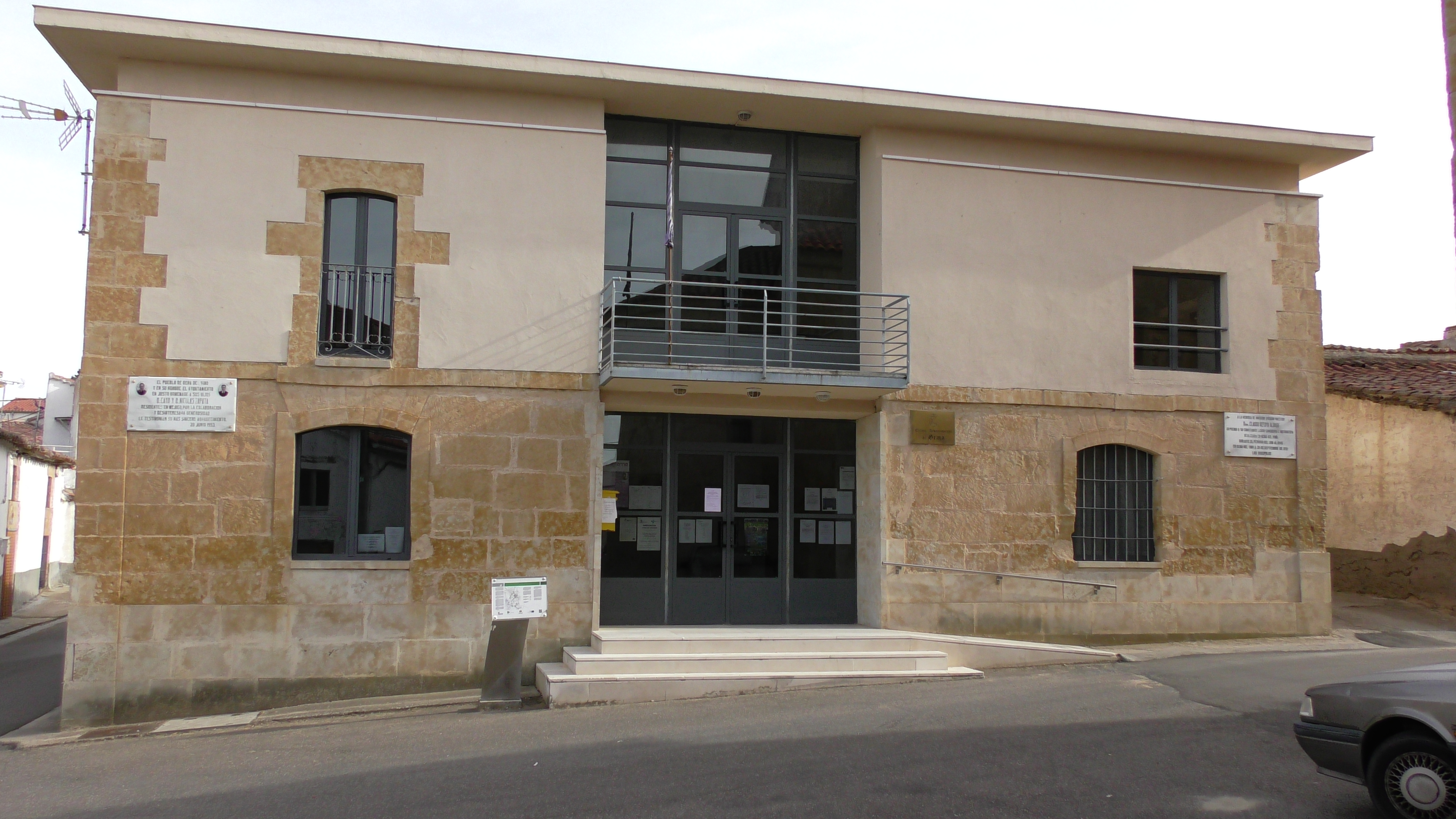

- Flag Coat of arms
- Interactive map of Gema
- Country: Spain
- Autonomous community: Castile and León
- Province: Zamora
- Municipality: Ferreras de Arriba

Area
  - Total: 1,785 km^{2} (689 sq mi)

Population (2025-01-01)
  - Total: 201
  - Density: 0.113/km^{2} (0.292/sq mi)
- Time zone: UTC+1 (CET)
  - Summer (DST): UTC+2 (CEST)

Gema is a municipality located in the province of Zamora, Castile and León, Spain. According to the 2009 census (INE), the municipality has a population of 257 inhabitants. It is located 14 km southwest of Zamora city.
