= GNC =

GNC may refer to:

== Businesses ==
- GNC (company), an American fitness and nutrition supplements retail chain
- Gibraltar Nynex Communications, a former telecommunications operator in Gibraltar
- Greencore, an Irish food company

== Politics ==
- Good Neighbour Council, a post-World War II program of the Government of Australia
- General National Congress, the former legislative authority of Libya
- Green National Committee, the governing body of the Green Party of the United States
- Green National Convention, of the Green Party of the United States
- Générations NC, political party in New Caledonia

== Schools ==
- Guagua National Colleges, in Pampanga, Philippines
- Guru Nanak College (disambiguation)

== Science and technology ==
- GNC hypothesis, on the origin of genes
- Guidance, navigation, and control, in aeronautics
- A cocaine hapten analog

== Other uses ==
- Gandhinagar Capital railway station, in Gujarat, India
- Gender nonconformity, the lack of a binary gender identity
- Geographical Names Committee, a Chinese organization adopting SASM/GNC romanization
- Global Night Commute, a 2006 protest event
- Guanche language
