= GLAST =

GLAST may refer to:

- Fermi Gamma-ray Space Telescope, formerly the Gamma-ray Large Area Space Telescope
- GLutamate ASpartate Transporter, a protein in humans
- GLAST (tokamak), a set of fusion research reactors of the Pakistan Atomic Energy Commission (PAEC)
