= GFE =

GFE may refer to:

- Goal-free evaluation
- GeForce Experience
- General Further Education, in the United Kingdom and Ireland
- Girlfriend experience, a type of sex work
- Glenferrie railway station, in Victoria, Australia
- Good faith estimate
- Government-Furnished Equipment, a term of art for equipment furnished by the US Federal government to fulfill contract obligations under Federal Acquisition Regulations
- Guinness Flavour Extract, used in the production of Guinness Foreign Extra Stout
