= Golgi-associated olfactory signaling regulator =

Protein-coding gene in the species Homo sapiens

GFY

Identifiers
- Aliases: GFY, Goofy, golgi associated olfactory signaling regulator
- External IDs: MGI: 2685427; HomoloGene: 85248; GeneCards: GFY; OMA:GFY - orthologs

Gene location (Human)
Chr.	Chromosome 19 (human)
Band	19q13.33	Start	49,423,749 bp
Band	19q13.33	End	49,428,987 bp

Gene location (Mouse)
Chr.	Chromosome 7 (mouse)
Band	7 B3|7	Start	44,825,773 bp
Band	7 B3|7	End	44,828,993 bp
RNA expression pattern
Bgee	Human / Mouse (ortholog); Top expressed in: gonad; cerebellar cortex; cerebellar hemisphere; right hemisphere of cerebellum; ganglionic eminence; dorsolateral prefrontal cortex; prefrontal cortex; Brodmann area 9; anterior cingulate cortex; superior frontal gyrus / Top expressed in: muscle of arm; thoracic diaphragm; left lung; right lung; mandible; testicle; maxilla; rib; Jacobson's organ; respiratory epithelium; More reference expression data
BioGPS	n/a
Orthologs
Species	Human	Mouse
Entrez	100507003	100039953
Ensembl	ENSG00000261949	ENSMUSG00000095276
UniProt	I3L273	J3KML8
RefSeq (mRNA)	NM_001195256; NM_001385187	NM_001195255
RefSeq (protein)	NP_001182185	NP_001182184
Location (UCSC)	Chr 19: 49.42 – 49.43 Mb	Chr 7: 44.83 – 44.83 Mb
PubMed search
- Wikidata
View/Edit Human	View/Edit Mouse

Golgi-associated olfactory signaling regulator is a protein that in humans is encoded by the GFY gene. This protein is required for proper olfactory system function.
