= Gq (disambiguation) =

GQ is an American monthly men's magazine.

GQ, Gq or gq may also refer to:

== Arts and media ==
- GQ (actor) (Gregory J. Qaiyum), American actor
- GQ (band), a 1970s American disco group
- GQ Australia, the Australian edition of the American magazine
- GQ (Indian edition), the Indian edition of the American magazine
- The German Quarterly, an American journal of German studies
- GQ, an American barbershop music group also known as Girls Quartet

== Science and mathematics ==
- G_{q} alpha subunit, a class of proteins
- Generalized quadrangle, a type of incidence structure in mathematics
- Generalized quantifier, a type of expression in linguistic semantics

== Other ==
- Equatorial Guinea (ISO 3166 code)
  - .gq, the country code top-level domain for Equatorial Guinea
- GQ, ICAO code prefix for airports in Mauritania
- Genderqueer, a gender identity other than man or woman
- General quarters, a call to battle stations aboard a naval warship
- Golden Quadrilateral, a highway network in India

== See also ==
- GQ Lupi and GQ Muscae, stars
- GQview, a free software image viewer
