= Melanie Tory =

Canadian computer scientist

Melanie K. Tory is a computer scientist who works in the US as Professor of the Practice at Northeastern University in Oakland, California, within Northeastern's Khoury College of Computer Sciences. Her research involves information visualization and human–computer interaction, and especially the interactions of people with data.

== Education ==
Tory was an undergraduate at the University of British Columbia (UBC). She completed a Ph.D. in computer science at Simon Fraser University in 2004. Her dissertation, Combining 2D and 3D views for visualization of spatial data, was supervised by Torsten Moeller.

== Career ==
She returned to UBC for an NSERC postdoctoral fellowship from 2004 to 2006, before taking a faculty position at the University of Victoria. She continued at the University of Victoria from 2006 to 2015, and then worked in industry at Tableau Software from 2015 to 2021, before returning to academia and taking her present position at Northeastern University.
