= GRN =

GRN may refer to:

== Broadcasting ==
- Global Radio News, a journalism organization
- Government Radio Network (Australia)
- Guadalupe Radio Network
- Swedish Broadcasting Commission (Swedish: Granskningsnämnden för radio och TV)

== Transport ==
- Greensborough railway station, in Victoria, Australia
- Greenville and Northern Railway, a defunct American railroad
- Grindleford railway station, in England

== Other uses ==
- An initialism for the Australian Greens political party
- Gene regulatory network
- Global Recordings Network, US Christian network
- Goods Received Note
- Granulin
- Grenada, IOC and UNDP country code
- Guarani dialects, ISO-639 code
