= GFL =

GFL may refer to:

== Sport ==
- Geelong Football League, an Australian rules football league
- Georgia–Florida League, a defunct minor baseball league
- German Football League, an American football league in Germany
- German Football League 2, a tier-two American football league in Germany
- Gibraltar Football League, an association football league in Gibraltar
- Gippsland Football League, an Australian rules football league
- Goldfields Football League, an Australian rules football league
- Utah Girls Football League, a youth American football league
- Global Fight League, a mixed martial arts league

== Other uses ==
- GFL Environmental, a Canadian waste collection company
- Floyd Bennett Memorial Airport (IATA: GFL), in Warren County, New York
- GDNF family of ligands
- Girls' Frontline, a mobile game
- Ghana Federation of Labour
- Great Food Live, a British television programme
- Gujarat Fluorochemicals Limited, an Indian chemical company
