= GWS =

GWS may refer to:

- Game-winning shots, the official IIHF name for an ice hockey penalty shootout
- George Wright Society, an American environmental and heritage organization
- Gerakan Wanita Sosialis, an Indonesian women's organization
- Girls With Slingshots, a webcomic
- Google Web Server
- GodWeenSatan: The Oneness, a 1990 album by American rock band Ween
- Great Western Society, an English railway preservation society
- Great white shark, largest mackerel shark and extant macropredatory shark
- Great White Spot, periodic storms on Saturn
- Greater Western Sydney, Sydney, Australia
- Greater Western Sydney Giants, an Australian rules football club
- Growing Without Schooling, a defunct American homeschooling newsletter
- Gulf War syndrome
- Google Workspace
