= GHA =

GHA or Gha may refer to:

== Entertainment ==
- Ghost Hunters Academy, an American television series

== Government ==
- Ghana Highways Authority
- Gibraltar Health Authority
- Wheatley Homes Glasgow (formerly "Glasgow Housing Association")

== Language ==
- Gha, a letter used in various Turkic languages
- Gha (Indic), a glyph in the Brahmic family of scripts
- Ghadamès language, ISO 639-3 code

== Sport ==
- Chabab Ghazieh SC, a Lebanese association football club
- Gibraltar Hockey Association
- Glasgow Hutchesons Aloysians RFC, a Scottish rugby union club
- Glenn Hoddle Academy, a British football academy

== Other uses ==
- Georgia Hospital Association, an American trade association
- General History of Africa, a UNESCO project
- Generalized Hebbian Algorithm
- GHA Coaches, a former British bus operator
- Global hectare, in ecology
- Global Hotel Alliance
- Good Homes Alliance, UK
- Green Hills Academy, in Kathmandu, Nepal
- Greenwich hour angle
- Noumérat – Moufdi Zakaria Airport, serving Ghardaïa, Algeria, IATA code
