= GNB =

GNB may refer to:

- Alpes–Isère Airport (IATA code: GNB), a French international airport serving Grenoble
- G. N. Balasubramaniam (1910–1965, also "GNB"), Indian Carnatic singer
- Goliath National Bank, a fictional business in the American sitcom, How I Met Your Mother
- Good News Bible, an English translation of the Christian bible
- GNB, a fictional television network in the American television sitcom Less than Perfect
- Granby–Grand County Airport (FAA LID code: GNB), general aviation airport outside Granby, Colorado
- Guinea-Bissau
- Venezuelan National Guard (Guardia Nacional Bolivariana de Venezuela), a gendarmerie component of the National Armed Forces of Venezuela
- gNodeB (Next-Generation Node B; gNB), a 5G base station
