= GFCF =

GFCF may refer to:

- Gross fixed capital formation, a macroeconomic concept used in official national accounts
- Gluten-free, casein-free diet, a diet that eliminates intake of gluten and casein
