= GSK =

GSK may refer to:

- GSK plc, formerly GlaxoSmithKline, a multinational pharmaceutical corporation
- Galatasaray S.K., a Turkish sports club based in Istanbul
- Glycogen synthase kinase
- Golden State Killer, a California serial rapist and murderer
- GTK Scene Graph Kit, a rendering pipeline
