= GMT (disambiguation) =

GMT, or Greenwich Mean Time, is an alias for the UTC+00:00 time zone.

GMT or gmt may also refer to:

== Science and technology ==
- Generic Mapping Tools in graphical computing
- Geometric measure theory
- Giant Magellan Telescope, a telescope under construction in Chile 11
- General Motors GMT platform, an automobile platform
- Great Melbourne Telescope, built in Dublin, Ireland
- Generalized Milankovitch Theory re: Quaternary glaciation

== Transport ==
- GATX, an American rolling stock leaser
- Granite Mountain Air Station, an airport in Alaska
- Greater Manchester Transport, in England
- Green Mountain Transit, a transportation company in Vermont
- Grosmont railway station, in England

== Other uses ==
- GMT (TV programme), United Kingdom
- Glycine/sarcosine N-methyltransferase, an enzyme
- G:MT – Greenwich Mean Time, a 1999 British film
- GMT Games, United States
- GMT Records, a Japanese record label
- Goodman–Martinez–Thompson correlation, between the Mayan and Julian calendars
- Guy McCoy Tormé, a British rock-band
- Metal-Textile Union, a former Austrian trade union
- Gregoria Mariska Tunjung, an Indonesian female badminton player
