= GL =

GL, Gl, or gl may refer to:

== Transportation and places ==
- Air Greenland (IATA airline designator GL)
- Germanischer Lloyd, a (ship) classification society
- Mercedes-Benz GL-Class, a German full-size SUV
- Rheinisch-Bergischer Kreis, Germany (vehicle area code GL)
- GL postcode area, UK
- Canton of Glarus, Switzerland (ISO 3166-2 subdivision code GL)
- Greenland (ISO 3166-1 alpha-2 and FIPS PUB 10-4 territory code GL)

== Politics ==
- GreenLeft, a former Dutch political party
- Gwardia Ludowa, a Polish resistance group during World War II
- Leather Union, a former German trade union
- G. L. Peiris (born 1946), Sri Lankan politician and academic

== Language ==
- Galician language (ISO 639 alpha-2 language code)
- "gl", a digraph for a voiced palatal lateral approximant in languages such as Italian (in most instances of "gli") and Romansh (before "a", "e", "o", "u", and "ö")

== Media ==
- Girls' love, an anime and manga jargon term for lesbian fiction
- Guiding Light, an American soap opera

== Mathematics ==
- GL, a symbol for provability logic
- $\operatorname{GL}(n)$, the general linear group of degree n
- $\mathfrak{gl}_n(F)$, the general linear Lie algebra

== Computing ==
- .gl, the country-code top-level domain (ccTLD) for Greenland
- Graphics library, a program library designed to aid in rendering computer graphics to a monitor

== Chemistry and medicine ==
- Gl, the element symbol for glucinium, a historic name of beryllium
- GL or Gl, the symbol for gigalitre, a metric unit of volume
- Glycemic load, an estimate of how much food will raise a person's blood glucose level

== See also ==
- Green Line (disambiguation)
- GI (disambiguation)
