= GDW =

GDW may refer to:

- GDW (TV station), an Australian digital television channel
- Game Designers' Workshop
- GdW Bundesverband deutscher Wohnungs- und Immobilienunternehmen, a German housing co-op association
- Gladwin Zettel Memorial Airport, in Michigan, United States
- Memorial to the German Resistance (German: Gedenkstätte Deutscher Widerstand), a museum in Berlin
