= Gaar =

Gaar or GAAR may refer to:

- Gaar Williams (1880–1935), American cartoonist
- Gaar-Scott, American threshing machine and steam traction engine manufacturer
- Gaar Corner, Oklahoma, unincorporated place in Oklahoma, United States
- GAAR (India) or General Anti-Avoidance Rule, India 2012
- GAAR or General Anti-Avoidance Rule as a response to tax avoidance in any country
- Galeshewe Anti-Aircraft Regiment, an artillery regiment of the South African Army
