= GRL =

GRL may refer to:

- G.R.L., an American-British-Canadian girl group
  - G.R.L. (EP), a 2014 recording by G.R.L.
- 3 Letter ISO 3166 code for Greenland
- Air Greenland
- Gamma Rho Lambda, a sorority
- Geophysical Research Letters, an academic journal
- Geospatial Research Laboratory
- Goal-oriented Requirements Language
- Greenfaulds railway station, in Scotland
- Glucocorticoid receptor
