= GPU (disambiguation) =

GPU, or graphics processing unit, is a specialized electronic circuit that accelerates graphics.

GPU may also refer to:

- Gambia Press Union, a Gambian journalist trade union
- General Public Utilities, a defunct American electric utility
- General Purpose Uniform, of the Royal Australian Air Force
- Global Peace and Unity, an annual Muslim conference
- Ground power unit, used to power aircraft on the ground
- State Political Directorate (Russian: Государственное политическое управление, Gosudarstvennoye Politicheskoye Upravlenie), the Soviet national security agency (1922–1923)
- Government of Peace and Unity, a parallel government in Sudan
