= GRC =

GRC may refer to:

== Business ==
- Governance, risk management, and compliance, business governance and management approach

== Government and politics ==
- Gender Recognition Certificate, in the United Kingdom
- Government of the Republic of China
- Greece
- Group representation constituency in Singapore
- Royal Canadian Mounted Police (French: Gendarmerie Royale du Canada)

== Science and technology ==
- Genome Reference Consortium
- Gibson Research Corporation, an American software developer
- Glass fiber reinforced concrete
- Glenn Research Center, a NASA research center in Cleveland, Ohio
- GNU Radio Companion
- Gordon Research Conferences
- Guided-rotor compressor
- Gridcoin (GRC), a cryptocurrency

== Sport ==
- Glasgow Rowing Club
- Global Rallycross

== Transportation ==
- Ghana Railway Corporation
- GRC, the National Rail station code for Great Chesterford railway station, Essex, England

== Other uses ==
- grc, ISO 639-3 code for Ancient Greek and Medieval Greek languages
- General Revenue Corporation, an American collection agency
- Grassroots Radio Coalition, an American advocacy group
- Green River College, in Auburn, Washington, United States
- Gulf Research Center, an Emirati think tank
- Global Repatriation Council, a fictional entity in the Marvel Cinematic Universe, appearing in the TV series The Falcon and the Winter Soldier
- Guthy-Renker, an American direct marketing firm
- Atlanta-based General Recording Corporation, which operated the GRC Records label in the 1970s
