= GDC =

GDC may refer to:

== Organizations ==
- Democratic Group of the Centre (Romanian: Grupul Democrat de Centru), a political party in Romania
- Gabriel Dumont College, now Gabriel Dumont Institute, in Saskatchewan, Canada
- Gambia Democratic Congress, a political party in the Gambia
- General Development Corporation, a defunct American real estate company
- General Dental Council in the United Kingdom
- Genstar Development Company, a Canadian real estate developer
- Georgia Department of Corrections, of the U.S. state of Georgia
- Geothermal Development Company, in Kenya
- Giordano Dance Chicago, an American dance company
- Government degree colleges in India
- Gravity Discovery Centre, in Gingin, Western Australia
- Society of Graphic Designers of Canada
- Virginia General District Court

== Science and technology ==
- Gadolinium-doped ceria
- Game Developers Conference, an annual video game conference
- Graphic Display Calculator
- Guglielmi detachable coil
- GDC, a compiler for the D programming language

== Other uses ==
- IATA airport code for Donaldson Center Airport, Greenville, South Carolina, United States
- Gross dealer concession
- Global Digital Compact, an initiative in the United Nations
