= GFI =

GFI may refer to:

- Caribbean Star Airlines, a defunct airline of Antigua and Barbuda
- GFI Group, an American financial services company
- General Fare Industries, the former name of Genfare, an American company
- Go4It, a British children's radio programme
- Gold Fields, a South African mining company
- Golden Future Institute, a school in Addis Ababa, Ethiopia
- The Good Food Institute, a nonprofit organization promoting plant- and cell-based alternatives to animal products
- Grand Forks International, a baseball tournament
- Ground fault circuit interrupter, an electrical safety device
- Goodness of fit, a measure of how well a statistical model fits a set of observations
