= GEQ =

GEQ or geq can refer to:

- Equatorial Guinea, country in Central Africa
- Greater than or equal to, in mathematics
- Graphic equalizer, kind of audio processing tool
- Geme language, Zande language spoken near the town of Ndélé, Central African Republic
