= GTFO =

GTFO is an acronym for "Get the fuck out", which is commonly used in SMS language.

GTFO may also refer to:

- GTFO (film), a 2015 American documentary on gaming
- "GTFO" (Mariah Carey song), 2018
- "GTFO" (Genesis Owusu song), 2022
- GTFO (video game), a 2019 co-op horror first-person-shooter game
