= GOTS =

The four-letter abbreviation GOTS may have several meanings, depending on context:

- Global Organic Textile Standard, a non-profit organic certification; see Sustainable fashion
- Government off-the-shelf
- Ghost of the sun
- Simenti Airport, by ICAO code

== See also ==
- NASCAR Gander Outdoors Truck Series (NGOTS)
