= GMAC =

GMAC or G-MAC may refer to:

== Organizations ==
- Ally Financial (General Motors Acceptance Corporation), traded as GMAC until 2010
- GMAC Insurance, former name of National General Insurance
- GMAC Real Estate, a former real estate franchised brokerage firm
- GMAC ResCap (Residential Capital), which includes GMAC Mortgage
- GMAC Re, a former reinsurance company of GMAC
- Graduate Management Admission Council, an international association of business schools
- GMA Canada, the Gospel Music Association of Canada, formerly the CGMA
- Global Markets Advisory Committee, part of the U.S. Commodity Futures Trading Commission

== Computing ==
- Galois Message Authentication Code, a type of cryptographic message authentication code
- Giga multiply–accumulate operations per second, a rate of multiply–accumulate operations
- Gigabit media access controller, for handling an Ethernet physical transceiver; See Gigabit Ethernet

== Other uses ==
- Graeme McDowell (born 1979), Northern Irish professional golfer nicknamed G-Mac
- GMAC Bowl, a sponsored game of college level American football, now known as the LendingTree Bowl
- Great Midwest Athletic Conference, a U.S. college athletic conference established in 2011 and starting competition in 2012

== See also ==
- GMAC massacre, a 1990 shooting by James Edward Pough in a car loan office in Florida, US
