= GDR (disambiguation) =

German Democratic Republic (GDR, 1949–1990) was the official name for East Germany, a state during the Cold War.

GDR may also refer to:

- General Distribution Release, a concept in software engineering
- Georgian Democratic Republic (or Democratic Republic of Georgia, 1918–1921), the first modern establishment of a Republic of Georgia
- Giant Dipole Resonance, collective oscillation of all protons against all neutrons in a nucleus
- Global depository receipt, a concept in international banking
- Greenhouse Development Rights, a climate change policy concept
- Gudur Junction railway station, in Andhra Pradesh, India
- Democratic and Republican Left group (French: Groupe de la Gauche démocrate et républicaine), a French parliamentary group
- Great Dividing Range, the fifth-longest land-based mountain range in the world, situated in eastern Australia
- Graphics display resolution, a comparison of screen resolutions, measured in pixels
