= GZ =

GZ or gz may refer to:

- .gz, the file extension for gzip files (GNU zip, an open source file compression program)
- GZ, an HCPCS Level II modifier meaning an item or service is expected to be denied as not reasonable or necessary
- GZ, the "righting moment" or "righting arm" acting to restore a tilting ship to vertical; see metacentric height
- Galaxy Zoo, a crowdsourced astronomy project
- Gaza Strip (FIPS PUB 10-4 territory code)
- Gestrichener Zellstoffkarton (German; DIN 19303 Code), a grade of paperboard also known as solid bleached board
- Ground Zero, in military parlance
- Guangzhou, capital and largest city of Guangdong Province in southeastern China
- Guizhou, a province of China (Guobiao abbreviation GZ)
- Air Rarotonga (IATA airline designator)
- Metal Gear Solid V: Ground Zeroes, a 2014 video game
- "Gz", a song by JID from God Does Like Ugly
