= GLV =

GLV may refer to:

- GLV (TV station), in Victoria, Australia
- British Rail Class 489, an electrical multiple unit
- Golovin Airport, in Alaska, United States
- Grating light valve
- Green leaf volatiles
- Manx language
- Titan II GLV, an American launch vehicle
- General linear group, GL(V) of a vector space V, in mathematics
