= GFN =

GFN may refer to:

- GFN, the IATA code for Clarence Valley Regional Airport, an airport in Grafton, New South Wales, Australia
- GFN, the National Rail code for Giffnock railway station, East Renfrewshire, Scotland
- GFN, Generalized Fermat numbers.
- NVIDIA's GeForce Now service for cloud gaming.
