= GTC =

GTC may refer to:

== Education ==
- General Teaching Council (disambiguation)
- Gateway Technical College, in Wisconsin, United States
- Green Templeton College, Oxford, a constituent college of the University of Oxford
- Greenville Technical College, in South Carolina, United States
- Griffin Technical College, now part of Southern Crescent Technical College, in Georgia, United States
- Gwinnett Technical College, in Georgia, United States
- Government Tolaram College, in Narayanganj, Bangladesh

== Science and medicine ==
- Generalised tonic-clonic seizure
- Graceful tree conjecture
- Gran Telescopio Canarias, a Spanish telescope
- Gigatonnes of carbon (GtC)
- GTC, a codon for the amino acid valine

== Technology ==
- Game time card, in online gaming
- Genome Therapeutics Corporation, a defunct American biotech company
- GPU Technology Conference, an annual technical conference started by Nvidia in 2009
- Opel GTC, a concept car

== Telecommunications ==
- Generic Token Card, in wireless and point-to-point communications
- Grameen Telecom, a Bangladeshi telecommunications company
- GTC Wireless, an American telecommunications company

== Other uses ==
- Gauhati Town Club, an Indian sports club
- General Trade Company, a defunct Dano-Norwegian trading company
- GeTai Challenge, abbreviated as GTC, a Singaporean reality singing competition for getai singers organised by MediaCorp
- Girls' Training Corps, a former British girls' voluntary organisation
- Going to California (TV series)
- Good 'til cancelled, an investment order
- Global Touring Challenge: Africa, a 2001 video game also known as GTC: Africa
- Gran Turismo Concept, a 2002 video game
- Sasol GTC Championship, a South African motorsport championship
- Grand Traverse County, in Michigan, United States
- Grand Trunk Corporation, a Canadian National Railway subsidiary
- Ground Training Competition, of the Royal Air Force
- Grudge Training Center, a mixed martial arts training center in Colorado, United States
- Guild of Television Camera Professionals an organisation for professional camera people
