= GGP =

GGP may refer to:

== Sciences and mathematics ==
- Gan–Gross–Prasad conjecture, a conjecture in number theory
- Gateway-to-Gateway Protocol
- General game playing, in artificial intelligence

== Organizations ==
- Generations and Gender Programme of the United Nations Economic Commission for Europe
- Georgia Green Party, a state-level political party in the U.S.
- Global Goods Partners, a fair-trade nonprofit organization
- Garden Grove Playhouse, a former theater group in Orange County, California
- Gondwana Ganatantra Party, an Indian political party

== Other uses ==
- Golden Gate Park in San Francisco
- GGP, an American commercial real estate company
- Goldfields Gas Pipeline
- Good guidance practice
- Guernsey pound, the currency of Guernsey
- Logansport/Cass County Airport, in Indiana
