= GCN =

GCN may refer to:

== Media and society ==
- Gay Christian Network, now called Q Christian Fellowship, a nonprofit organization and associated social networking site
- Gay Community News (Dublin), Ireland's longest running gay newspaper, published since 1988 by the National Lesbian and Gay Federation
- Gay City News, a free weekly LGBT newspaper stylized as gcn.
- Gay Community News (Boston), a weekly journal published in Boston from 1973 to 1992
- Genesis Communications Network, a defunct US radio network
- Global Cycling Network, a YouTube channel

== Science and technology ==
- General Coordinates Network, formerly known as Gamma-ray burst coordinates network
- Graphics Core Next, an AMD graphics microarchitecture series
- Degenerate codon for the amino acid Alanine (A)

== Other uses ==
- Grand Canyon National Park Airport (IATA code)
- GameCube (GCN), a video game console developed by Nintendo
- Gavin Christopher Newsom (born 1967), 40th Governor of California

== See also ==
- General control non-derepressible, proteins such as Gcn2 and Gcn4
