= GOC =

Goc or GOC may refer to:

== People ==
- Marcel Goc (born 1983), German ice hockey player
- Nikolai Goc (born 1986), German ice hockey player
- Sascha Goc (born 1979), German ice hockey player

== Other uses ==
- Goč, a mountain in Serbia
- Gene Ontology Consortium, the groups involved in the Gene Ontology project
- General officer commanding
- General Optical Council, a British medical regulator
- Global Occult Coalition, a fictional assembly of the United Nations dedicated to the paranormal; from the SCP Foundation.
- Government of Canada
- Government-owned corporation
- Greek Orthodox Church
- Ground Observer Corps, an American World War II and Cold War Civil Defense organization
- Guardians of the Cedars, a former Lebanese militia
- Golden Rock railway station, in Golden Rock, Tiruchirappalli, India
