= GTG =

Gtg, GTG, gtg, or G2G may refer to:

- Grantsburg Municipal Airport (IATA code)
- Gauge theory gravity, a theory of gravitation
- Geophysical Tomography Group, of the Institut de Physique du Globe de Paris
- G2G Racing, an American stock car racing team
- GTG, a codon in the DNA codon table for the amino acid valine
- G2G, government-to-government, as in government-to-government contracting and in e-governance
- Good to Go, electronic toll system in Washington state
