= GRB =

GRB or grb may refer to:

== Organizations ==
- ASX stock code for Gage Roads Brewing Company, an Australian brewery
- Game Rating Board, former name of the South Korean game rating organization
- GRB Studios, an American television production company

== Science and technology ==
- Gamma-ray burst, an astronomical event
- Granzyme B (GrB), serine protease most commonly found in the granules of NK cells and cytotoxic T cells
- .grb, the file extension of GRIB files

== Transportation ==
- Station code for Great Bentley railway station, in Essex, England
- IATA and FAA codes for Green Bay–Austin Straubel International Airport, in Wisconsin, U.S.

== Other uses ==
- George R. Brown Convention Center, in Houston, Texas, U.S.
- Postal code for Għarb, Gozo Island, Malta
- ISO 639-2 and 639-3 codes for Grebo language, a Kru language spoken in Liberia and the Ivory Coast
