= GUF =

GUF may refer to:

- Guf, the Treasury of Souls in Jewish mysticism
- Dhuwal language, native to Australia
- French Guiana (ISO 3166-1 alpha-3 country code)
- Guf (russian rapper), a Russian rapper
- Global union federation, an international federation of labor unions
- Grandes Unités Françaises, a World War II reference work
- Gulfport station, in Mississippi, United States
- Jack Edwards Airport, in Gulf Shores, Alabama, United States
- Gruppo Universitario Fascista, the student wing of the National Fascist Party in Italy

== See also ==
- The Gufs, an American pop-rock band
