= GSW =

GSW may refer to:

- Geological Society of Washington
- Georgia Southwestern State University, in the United States
- God Street Wine, a New York City-based rock band
- Golden State Warriors, an American professional basketball team based in San Francisco
- GSW Immobilien, a company in Berlin
- GSW Limited, Canadian appliance maker formed by the merger of Beatty Brothers Limited and General Steel Wares
- Gunshot wound
- MIT Global Startup Workshop, an international entrepreneurship conference.

== Aviation ==
- Greater Southwest International Airport, in Fort Worth, Texas, now closed
- HolidayJet, a defunct Swiss airline
- Sky Wings Airlines, a defunct Greek airline

== Language ==
- Alsatian dialect
- Swiss German dialect
