= GMB =

GMB may refer to:

== Arts and media ==
- GMB (album), 2012, by hip-hop trio Pac Div
- Good Morning Britain, a 2014 British breakfast television programme
- Good Morning Britain (1983 TV programme)

== Honours ==
- Grand Bauhinia Medal, Hong Kong
- Great Master of the Order of the Bath, UK/Great Britain

== Places ==
=== Africa ===
- The Gambia, by ISO 3166 alpha-3 country code
- Gambela Airport, Ethiopia, by IATA code

=== Europe ===
- Gardermoen Line (Norwegian: Gardermobanen), a high-speed railway
- Graduates Memorial Building, at Trinity College, Dublin, Ireland
- Grimsby Town railway station, England, by GBR code

== Other uses ==
- GMB (trade union), UK
- Gladding, McBean, American ceramics company
- Google My Business, former name of Google Business Profile (GBP), a feature of Google Maps for professionals
- Martin GMB, 1918 US bomber aircraft
