= Global Technology Associates =

Global Technology Associates, Inc.
- Company type: Privately held company
- Industry: Network security
- Founded: 1992
- Defunct: 2018
- Headquarters: Orlando, Florida USA
- Products: Unified threat management (UTM), Firewalls, Antivirus, Intrusion-prevention system, Antispam, VPN, URL Filtering, Virtualization, IPv6
- Website: www.facebook.com/GTAFirewalls/

Global Technology Associates, Inc. (GTA) was a developer and pioneer of Internet firewalls. The company was privately held with its headquarters, development, and support facilities based in Orlando, Florida.

== History ==
GTA was founded by a group of software engineers in 1992, and in 1994 was one of the first companies to introduced a commercial firewall. The original firewall they introduced was the GFX-94. The GFX-94 was a stateful firewall with unique dual walled design that consisted of two separate hardware devices comprising the inner and outer firewall. The GFX-94 was in the first group of firewalls certified by the NCSA (now ICSA). In 1996 GTA introduced the first tiny footprint firewall, the GNAT Box firewall, which fit entirely on a 3.5" floppy diskette. The GNAT Box firewall evolved into GB-OS. GB-OS was the operating system for all GTA firewalls and carried the ICSA Firewall Certification.

In April 2018, the company announced on its Facebook page that it was ending all new business.
