= GXY =

GXY may refer to:

- Galaxy Airlines (Japan) (ICAO: GXY), a defunct Japanese cargo airline headquartered in Ōta, Tokyo
- Galaxy Resources (ASX stock symbol: GXY), a defunct Australian public mining company
- Greeley–Weld County Airport (IATA: GXY), a public use airport located in Greeley, Colorado, United States
