= GRP =

GRP may refer to:

== Biochemistry ==
- Gastrin-releasing peptide
- Grp78, Grp94, Grp170, glucose-regulated proteins
- Grape reaction product

== Mathematics ==
- Grp, the Category of groups

== Technology and materials ==
- Glass-reinforced-polymer, also known as Fiberglass, or Fibreglass.
- Gentoo Reference Platform

== Transport ==
- Grove Park railway station, London, National Rail station code

== Other uses ==
- Government resource planning
- US Grasslands Reserve Program
- Gross rating point
- Gross regional product
- GRP Records, an American jazz label
- Gurupi Airport, in Brazil
