= GYY =

GYY or gyy may refer to:

- Gary/Chicago International Airport, Indiana, United States, IATA airport code GYY
- Gunya, a dialect of Australian Aboriginal Bidjara language, ISO 639-3 language code gyy
