= GSO =

GSO may refer to:

== Organizations ==
- GCC Standardization Organization, of the Gulf Cooperation Council
- General Statistics Office of Vietnam
- Golden State Overnight, former name of American logistics company GLS-US
- Government Shipping Office, of the Government of Pakistan
- Grassroots Support Organization
- GSO Capital Partners, an American asset management firm

=== Orchestras ===
- Gamer Symphony Orchestra at the University of Maryland, US
- Gothenburg Symphony Orchestra, Sweden
- Greenville Symphony Orchestra, South Carolina, US
- Guangzhou Symphony Orchestra, China

== Science and mathematics ==
- Gadolinium oxyorthosilicate, a type of scintillating inorganic crystal
- Generic segmentation offload, in computer networking
- Geosynchronous orbit, an orbit around Earth of a satellite
- Gram-Schmidt orthogonalization, in mathematics
- GSO projection, in superstring theory

== Other uses ==
- General Staff Officer
- GSO Stadium, a former stadium in Limassol, Cyprus
- Piedmont Triad International Airport (IATA and FAA LID codes), North Carolina, US
- Southwest Gbaya language (ISO 639-3 code)
