= GTK (disambiguation) =

GTK is a cross-platform GUI widget software toolkit.

GTK may also refer to:

== Computing ==
- Group Temporal Key, in IEEE 802.11i-2004 wireless network security

== Organisations ==
- GTK Rossiya, a Russian airline (founded 1992)
- Geological Survey of Finland, a government agency (Finnish: Geologian tutkimuskeskus, founded 1885)

== Television shows ==
- GTK (TV series), Australia (ran 1969–1975)
- Ghost Trackers, Canada (ran 2005–2008)

== See also ==
- gtk--, former name of gtkmm, a C++ interface for GTK
