= Metallothionein 1G =

Protein found in humans

MT1G
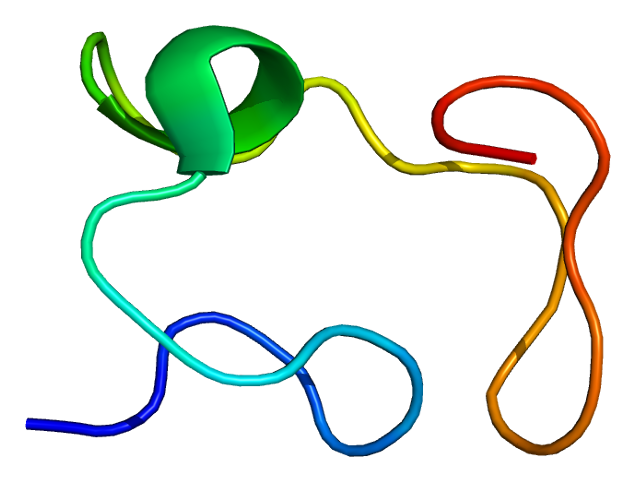

Identifiers
- Aliases: MT1G, MT1, MT1K, Metallothionein 1G
- External IDs: OMIM: 156353; GeneCards: MT1G; OMA:MT1G - orthologs

Gene location (Human)
Chr.	Chromosome 16 (human)
Band	16q13	Start	56,666,730 bp
Band	16q13	End	56,668,065 bp
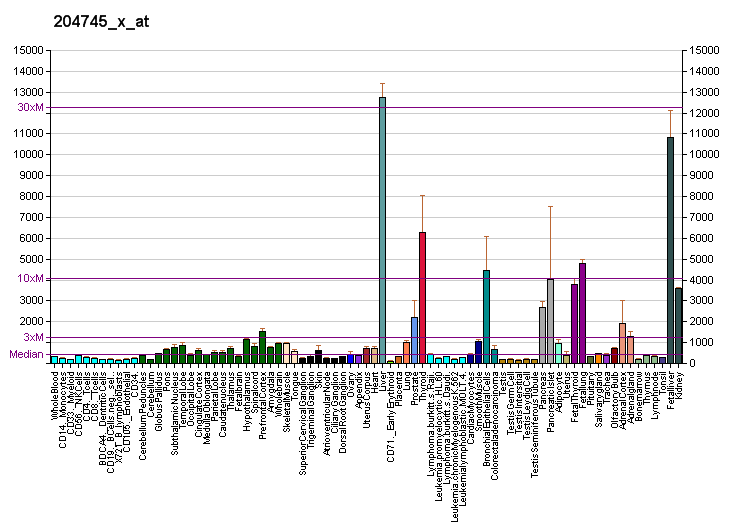
RNA expression pattern
Bgee	Human / Mouse (ortholog); Top expressed in: mucosa of transverse colon; right lobe of liver; mucosa of ileum; human kidney; right lobe of thyroid gland; left lobe of thyroid gland; buccal mucosa cell; kidney tubule; body of pancreas; rectum / n/a; More reference expression data
BioGPS	More reference expression data
Gene ontology
Molecular function	zinc ion binding; protein binding; metal ion binding
Cellular component	cytoplasm; perinuclear region of cytoplasm; nucleus
Biological process	monocyte activation; cellular response to copper ion; cellular response to vascular endothelial growth factor stimulus; negative regulation of growth; cellular response to cadmium ion; monocyte differentiation; cellular response to zinc ion; cellular zinc ion homeostasis; detoxification of copper ion
Sources:Amigo / QuickGO
Orthologs
Species	Human	Mouse
Entrez	4495	n/a
Ensembl	ENSG00000125144	n/a
UniProt	P13640	n/a
RefSeq (mRNA)	NM_005950; NM_001301267	n/a
RefSeq (protein)	NP_001288196; NP_005941	n/a
Location (UCSC)	Chr 16: 56.67 – 56.67 Mb	n/a
PubMed search		n/a
- Wikidata
View/Edit Human

Metallothionein-1G is a protein that in humans is encoded by the MT1G gene.
