= GSG =

GSG may refer to:

== Businesses ==
- German Sport Guns GmbH, a German firearms manufacturer

== Government ==
- Government Statistician Group, a community of government statisticians in the UK
- GSG 9, a German counter-terrorism and special operations unit

== Other organizations ==
- George Street gang, a Belizean street gang
- Global Scenario Group, an environmental research organization
- Global Strategy Group, an American public affairs and research firm
- Grampian Speleological Group, a caving organisation, based in Scotland
- Great Southern Grammar, a school in rural Western Australia

== Other uses ==
- German Sign Language (ISO 639-3 language code)
- The Good Schools Guide, a British guide to schools
- Grand strategy game, a genre of board games and video games
