= GEV =

GEV may refer to:

- G.E.V. (board game), a tabletop game by Steve Jackson Games
- Ashe County Airport, in North Carolina, United States
- Gällivare Lapland Airport, in Sweden
- Generalized extreme value distribution
- GE Vernova, NYSE stock symbol
- Gev Sella, Israeli-South African motorcyclist
- Gigaelectronvolt (GeV)
- Grid-enabled vehicle
- Ground effect vehicle
- Groundnut eyespot virus
- Viya language
