= General Service Medal =

The General Service Medal can refer to any of the following medals:

- General Service Medal (1918)
- General Service Medal (1962)
- General Service Medal (2008)
- General Service Medal (Bophuthatswana)
- General Service Medal (Canada)
- General Service Medal (India)
- General Service Medal (Malaysia)
- General Services Medal (Oman)
- General Service Medal (Rhodesia)
- General Service Medal (South Africa)
- General Service Medal (Venda)
- Samanya Seva Medal
- New Zealand General Service Medal 1992 (Non-Warlike)
- New Zealand General Service Medal 1992 (Warlike)
