= GD =

GD may refer to:

== Arts and entertainment ==
- G-Dragon (born 1988), leader of the South Korean musical group Big Bang
- Grateful Dead, an American rock band
- Green Day, an American rock band
- Geometry Dash, a side-scrolling music platforming video game
- Graphic design, a branch of the fine arts that involves creating visual communications

== Business and economics ==
- Gardner Denver, a US-based manufacturer of industrial equipment
- General Dynamics, a US-based defense conglomerate
- Good Delivery, a specification for gold and silver bars
- Gudbrandsdølen Dagningen, a Norwegian newspaper
- Composite Index on the Athens Stock Exchange (stock symbol GD)

== Mathematics, science and technology ==
=== Biology and medicine ===
- Gender dysphoria, distress caused by a difference between the sex and gender a person was assigned at birth
- Generalized dystonia, a neurological movement disorder
- Gestational diabetes, a form of diabetes associated with pregnancy
- Gaucher's disease, a lipid storage diseases
- Graves' disease, an autoimmune thyroid disorder
- Gain of deiodinases or Sum activity of peripheral deiodinases, used in diagnosis of thyroid disorders
- Grover's disease, another name for Transient acantholytic dermatosis
- Video game addiction, also known as gaming disorder

=== Chemistry ===
- Gadolinium, symbol Gd, a chemical element
- Soman, a toxic chemical (NATO designation GD)

=== Computing ===
- GD Graphics Library, for dynamically manipulating images
- GD-ROM, storage media for the Sega Dreamcast
- .gd, the country code top-level domain for Grenada
- GDScript, the built-in language for the Godot game engine

=== Mathematics ===
- Gaussian distribution, also called the normal distribution, an important family of continuous probability distributions
- Generalized Dirichlet distribution, a probability distribution used in statistics
- Gudermannian function, used in map-making

== Places ==
- Georgia Dome, a stadium in Atlanta, Georgia and the home of the Atlanta Falcons
- Grenada (ISO 3166 country code)
- Guangdong, a province of China (Guobiao abbreviation GD)

== Other uses ==
- Gangster Disciples, a black street gang in the United States
- General Delivery (French: Poste restante), a service where the post office holds mail until the recipient calls for it
- Gefle Dagblad, a Swedish newspaper
- Georgian Dream, a political party in the country of Georgia
- Goal difference, in sport
- Scottish Gaelic language (ISO 639-1 code gd)
- Subaru Impreza (second generation) sedan (ID code: GD)
- G-d, a substitution of God used by some religiously observant Jews to refer to YHWH
- Goddamn, a curse.
- Toyota GD engine, a straight-4 piston diesel engine developed by Toyota in 2015
