= Gender, Technology and Development =

- Discipline: Gender Studies
- Language: English
- Edited by: Rebecca J Elmhirst, Yukari Sawada and Evelyn F. Wamboye

Publication details
- History: 1997-2016 (SAGE), 2017-present (T&F)
- Publisher: Taylor and Francis (UK)
- Frequency: Tri-annually

Standard abbreviations
- ISO 4: Gend. Technol. Dev.

Indexing
- ISSN: 0971-8524 (print); 0973-0656 (web)

Links
- Online access; Online archive

Gender, Technology and Development (GTD) is a double blind peer-reviewed journal that serves as a forum for exploring the linkages between gender relations, development and/or technological change. The objective of the journal is to provide a platform for original research and theorizing on the shifting meanings of gender, as it relates to advances in science and technologies and/or to social, political, economic, and cultural change. In particular, the journal is interested in addressing these in the context of transnational phenomena and engaging in dialogues that cut across geographical boundaries.

It is published three times a year. The journal was founded in 1997 and until 2016 was published by SAGE Publications in association with the Gender and Development Studies program at the Asian Institute of Technology. Since 2017, the journal is published by Taylor and Francis Group, also in association with the Asian Institute of Technology.

This journal is a member of the Committee on Publication Ethics (COPE).

== Abstracting and indexing ==
Gender, Technology and Development is abstracted and indexed in:

- International Bibliography of the Social Sciences
- SafetyLit
- SCOPUS
- DeepDyve
- Portico
- Dutch-KB
- Pro-Quest-RSP
- EBSCO
- OCLC
- Ohio
- ICI
- ProQuest-Illustrata
- J-Gate
- ESCI
