= G5 =

G5, G.V, G.5 or G-5 may refer to:

== Businesses and companies ==
- G5 Entertainment, a video game developer and publisher; see list of PlayStation minis
- G5, IATA code for China Express Airlines

== Electronics and software ==
- Canon PowerShot G5, a digital camera
- Dell G5 Series, a series of gaming laptops
- G5 bipin, a lamp standard
- LG G5, a smartphone developed by LG Electronics
- Logitech G5, a gaming mouse with variable weight and sensitivity settings
- Motorola G5 project, the failed Motorola PowerPC project to succeed its own PPC 74x
- PowerPC G5, the PowerPC 970 microprocessor from IBM
  - iMac G5, an all-in-one desktop computer by Apple
  - Power Mac G5, Apple's marketing name for models of the Power Macintosh which contain the IBM PowerPC 970 CPU

== Groups and organizations ==
- G5, former name for G6 (EU), a group of the largest West European countries
- G5 (universities), a grouping of five public research universities in England
- G5 Sahel, an alliance of five countries in West Africa
- Group of Five, five nations which have joined together for an active role in the rapidly evolving international order
- Group of Five conferences, college football conferences in the United States

== Military ==
- G-5-class motor torpedo boat, a World War II Soviet torpedo boat
- G5 carbine, a Georgian assault rifle
- G5 howitzer, a South African howitzer
- PMMC G5, a German light tracked vehicle
- G.V (pronounced "G5"), a German designation for several World War I heavy bombers:
  - AEG G.V, a biplane bomber aircraft of World War I, a further refinement of the AEG G.IV
  - Gotha G.V, a heavy bomber used by the Luftstreitkräfte (Imperial German Air Service) during World War I

== Science and medicine ==
- G5 star, a subclass of G-class stars
- Group 5 element, part of the periodic table of elements
- Haplogroup G2c (Y-DNA), a human Y chromosome haplogroup, formerly known as haplogroup G5 (Y-DNA)
- G-5 (drug), a psychedelic drug

== Transportation ==
=== Aircraft ===
- Fiat G.5, an Italian aerobatic tourer
- Gribovsky G-5, a Russian sport aircraft
- Gulfstream V, an American business jet

=== Automobiles ===
- BYD G5, a Chinese compact sedan
- Enranger G5, a Chinese compact crossover
- Gonow Aoosed GX5, a Chinese mid-size SUV previously known as G5
- Moskvitch G5, a Soviet Formula One car
- Pontiac G5, an American compact sedan/coupe
- Riich G5, a Chinese mid-size sedan

=== Rail ===
- G5, station number for Gaiemmae Station, of the Tokyo Metro Ginza Line
- LNER Class G5, the post-1923 designation for NER Class O steam locomotives
- PRR G5, a 4-6-0 steam locomotive built for the Pennsylvania Railroad
- A series of 2-6-0 steam locomotives built for the Prussian state railroads:
  - Prussian G 5.1
  - Prussian G 5.4
  - Prussian G 5.5

=== Other uses in transportation ===
- Yadea G5, a Chinese electric scooter
- Yamaha Libero G5, a Japanese-Indian motorcycle
- G5 Beijing–Kunming Expressway
- Galactic 05 (G05), a Virgin Galactic suborbital tourist spaceflight in November 2023
- Mazda G5, a Mazda G engine

== Other uses ==
- G5 paper, a Swedish paper format additional to SIS 014711

== See also ==
- 5G (disambiguation)
- Go Gawa poetry club, an artistic group from early 19th century Japan and leading patron of surimono woodblock prints
- GV (disambiguation)
