= GX5 =

GX5 may refer to:

== Automobiles ==
- Gonow Aoosed GX5, a 2010–2014 Chinese mid-size SUV
- Zedriv GX5, a 2019–present Chinese subcompact electric SUV
- Gleagle GX5, a 2010 and 2012 Chinese subcompact SUV concept
