= Moskvitch G4 =

Overview
- Production: 1963; 3 produced
- Designer: I. Gladilin; L. Shugorov

Body and chassis
- Class: Sports car
- Layout: RR layout

Powertrain
- Engine: 1358 cc UZMA-408 OHV I4 (G4, G4A); 1478 cc UZAM-412 OHC/DOHC I4 (G4M)

Chronology
- Predecessor: Moskvitch G3
- Successor: Moskvitch G5

The Moskvitch G4 were sports cars from Moskvitch released in 1963. Like the G3, they used the same engine as the Moskvitch 407, a 1358 cc pushrod four producing 76 PS (56 kW; 75 bhp) at 5500 rpm. Compared to Western racecars, the G4 was too heavy and suffered from poor aerodynamics. The G4 used a rigid spaceframe chassis, with aluminium skin.

In 1965, all three G4's were re-engined with units based on the engine in the Moskvitch 408 and redesignated G4A. The G4A also received smaller, 13-inch wheels in lieu of the earlier, 15-inch units. While the initial design had been fitted with a quartet of domestically produced Lenkarz-K99M motorcycle carburetors, the G4As were fitted with twin, imported Weber 40DCO carburettors. The engines also had the valve timing advanced, and new camshafts, giving 81 PS (60 kW; 80 bhp) at 5,600 rpm.

One G4A (the first production G4) was fitted with a larger, 1.5-litre Moskvitch 412-based engine, the DM, rated at 92 PS (68 kW; 91 bhp), becoming the G4M. During 1967–1968, the two remaining G4A's were converted into G4M's. Two G4M's were rebuilt into Moskvitch G5's in 1968. The third G4M was raced until 1972 – it was not converted to a G5, but it was updated with a twin-cam version of the 412 engine, producing 100 PS (74 kW; 99 bhp). The G4's had independent suspension, both front and rear (from the Moskvitch 407), and were successful in several USSR championships.
