= Geely Yuanjing =

Compact sedan

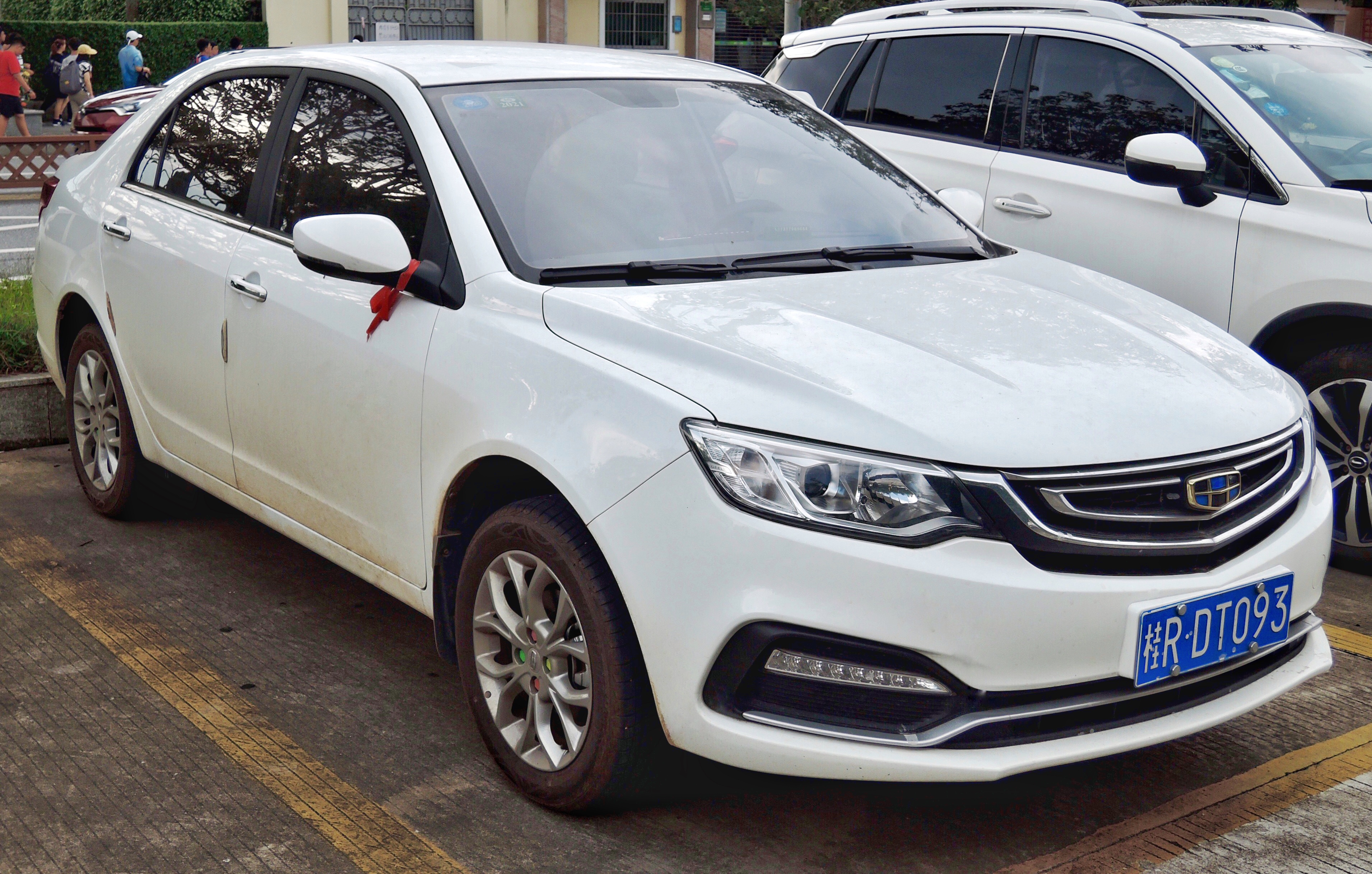
- 3rd generation of Yuanjing

Overview
- Manufacturer: Gleagle (2012–2013), Geely Auto (2007–2021)
- Also called: Geely Vision; Geely FC/FC1/FC2/FC3; Geely SC7; Gleagle FC; Gleagle GC7
- Production: 2006–2021
- Assembly: Ningbo, Zhejiang, China

Body and chassis
- Class: compact car (C)
- Body style: 4-door sedan
- Layout: Front-engine, front-wheel-drive
- Related: Geely Haijing

Powertrain
- Engine: 1.3 L 4G13 I4; 1.5 L 4G15 I4; 1.8 L 4G18 I4

The Geely Yuanjing is a four-door compact sedan produced by the Chinese automaker Geely Auto under the Yuanjing or Vision product series. It is the first commercial car produced by Geely Automobiles. The car was first introduced in 2006. It carries the first CVVT engine designed and made in China. The car was named Geely Tiger, Biaowang and Luhu, but it was later renamed "Vision" (远景, Yuǎn jǐng).

The Yuanjing went on sale on May 18, 2007 after being adjusted by Magna Steyr. The Geely Haijing (Englon Haijing) was based on the SMA Haijing, which was similar to the first generation Yuanjing. It features a 6-speed tiptronic transmission or 5-speed automatic transmission which is the same as the Yuanjing.

== First generation (FC1; 2007-2013) ==
The first generation of Geely Yuanjing went on sale on May 18, 2007 after being adjusted by Magna Steyr. Originally named the Geely FC, the compact sedan was later renamed to Geely Yuanjing (Vision) sedan under the Yuanjing (Vision) product series as opposed to the Geely Emgrand (EC7) sedan of the Geely Emgrand product series (Previously a separate sub-brand of Geely). It set its opposite as Hyundai Elantra, which was being sold better than most models in China.

=== Styling ===
Styling of the Geely Yuanjing throughout the generations remains similar as the second and third generation cars were extensive facelifts of the first. The original Geely Yuanjing was criticized for resembling the Toyota Corolla (E120), as the Yuanjing was developed benchmarking the compact sedan from Toyota. Most of the early Geely products have the tendency of resembling Toyota products as reverse engineering took a huge part in Geely's past.

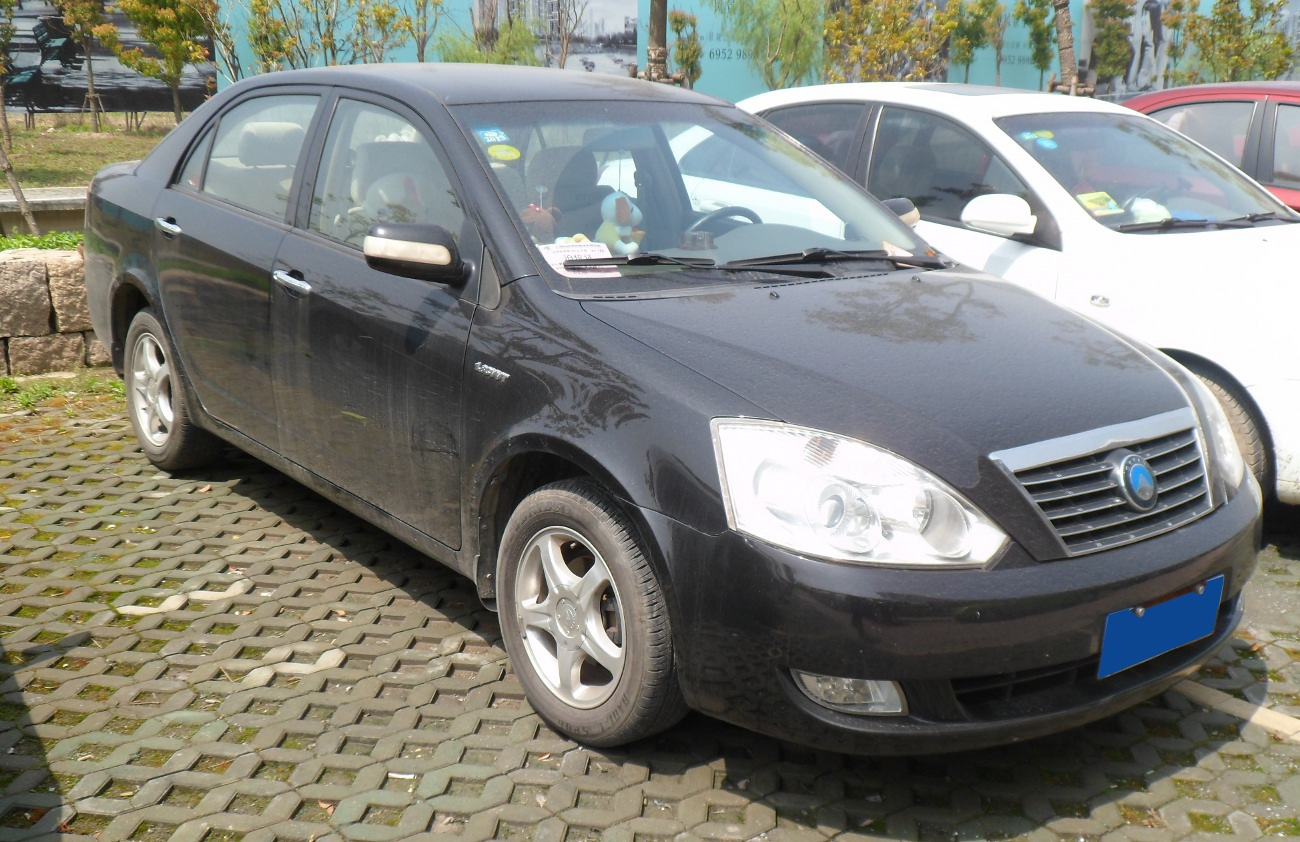
Original Geely Yuanjing (FC1)

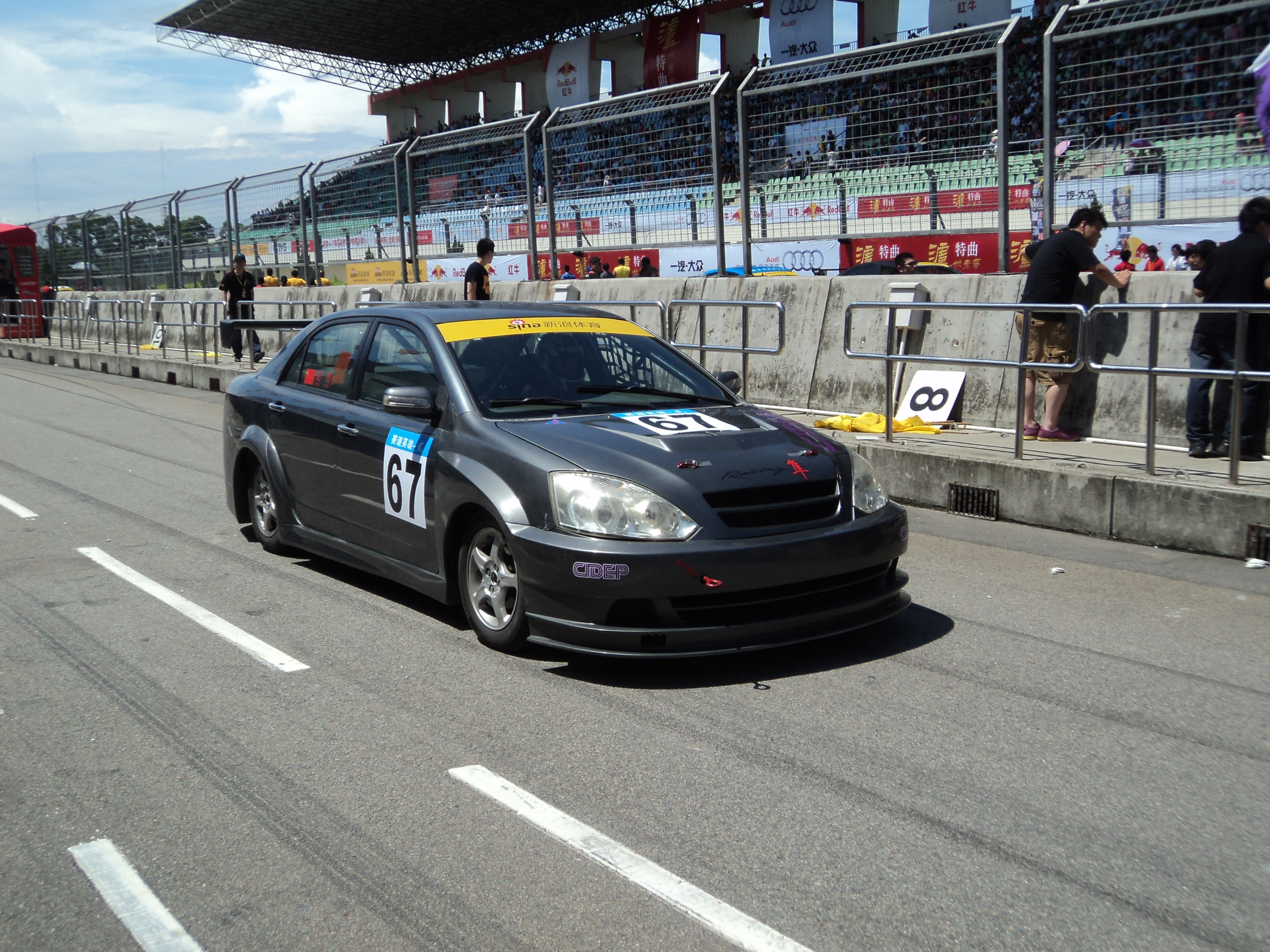
Geely Vision racecar (FC1)

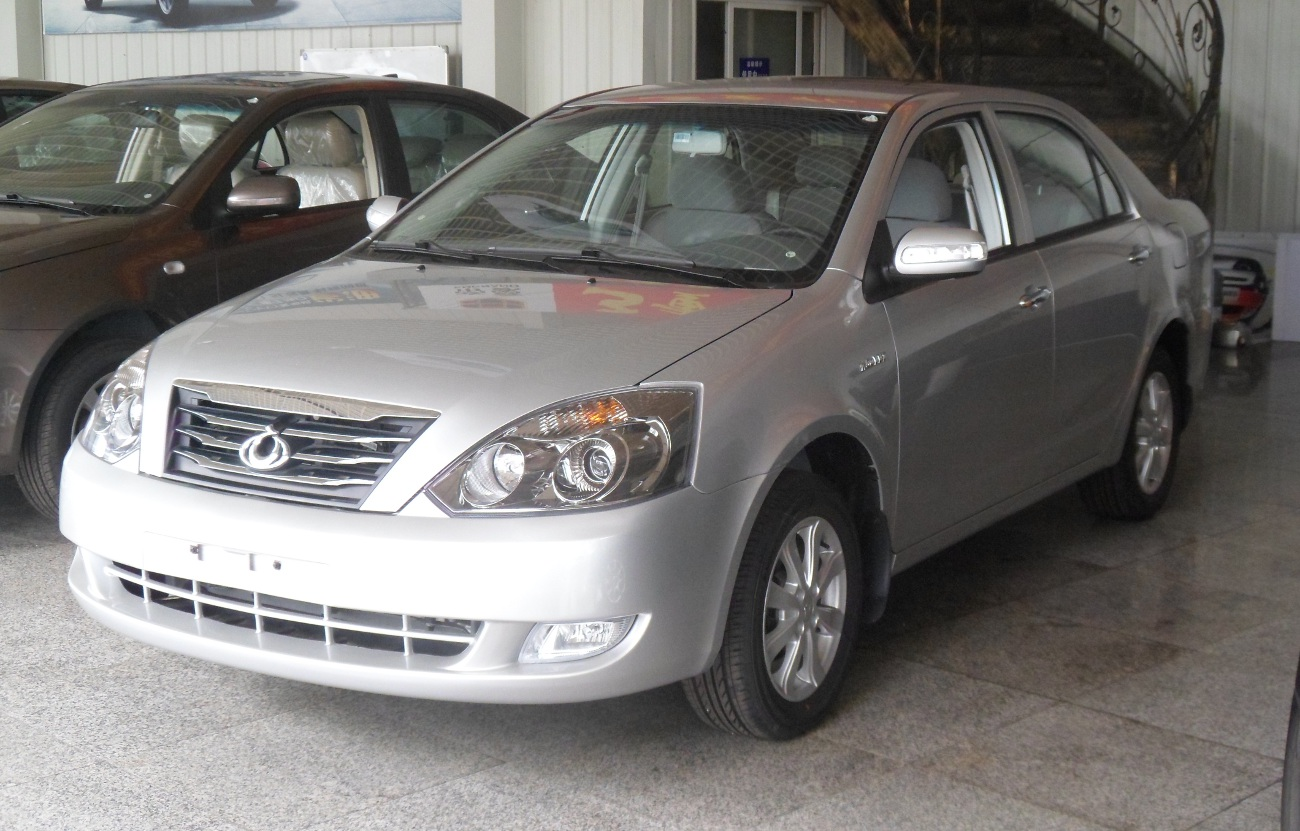
Gleagle FC sedan (FC1)

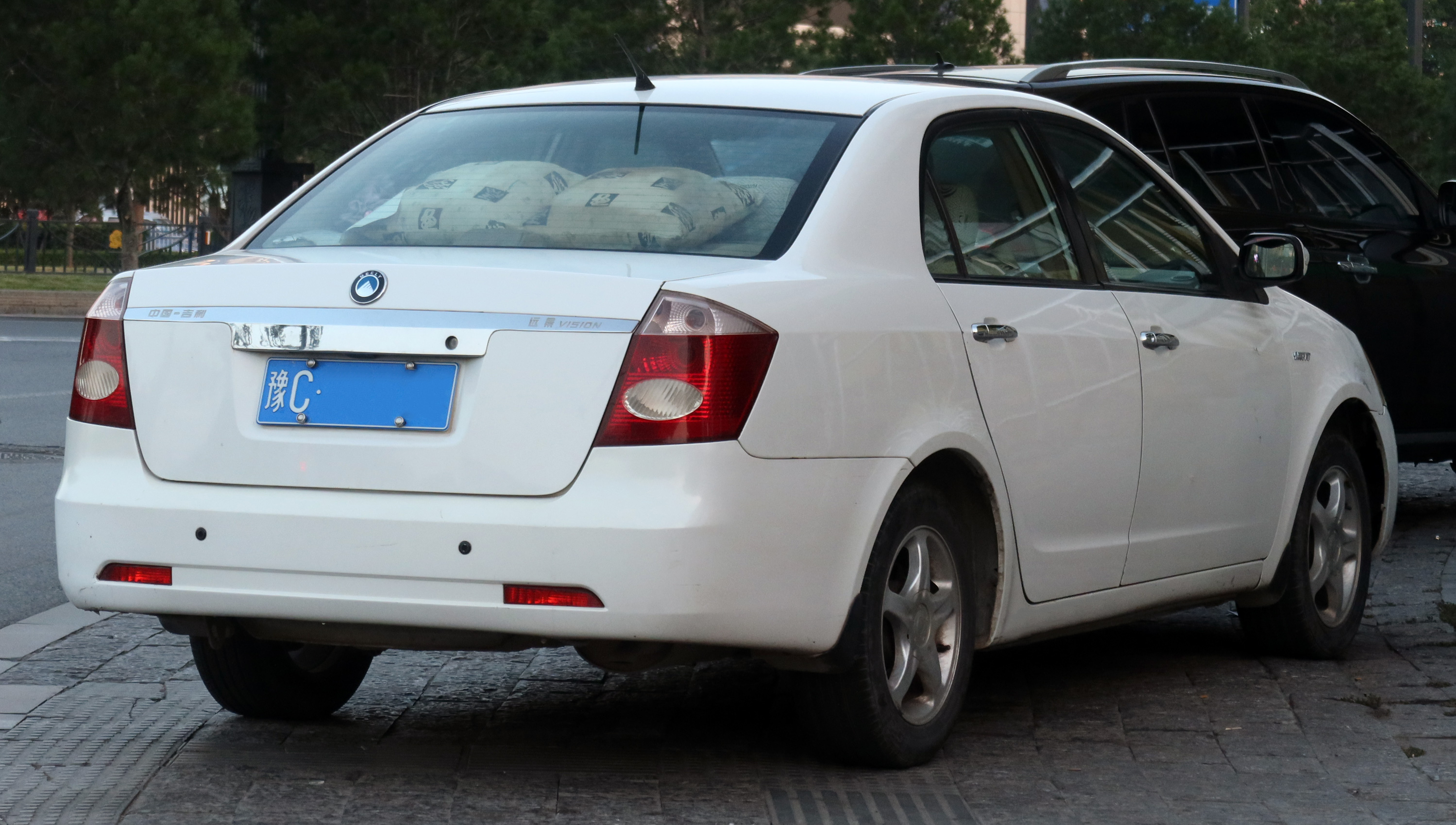
Rear view

=== Technology ===
The Yuanjing features ABS and EBD systems for all models.

== Geely Haijing ==
Geely Haijing
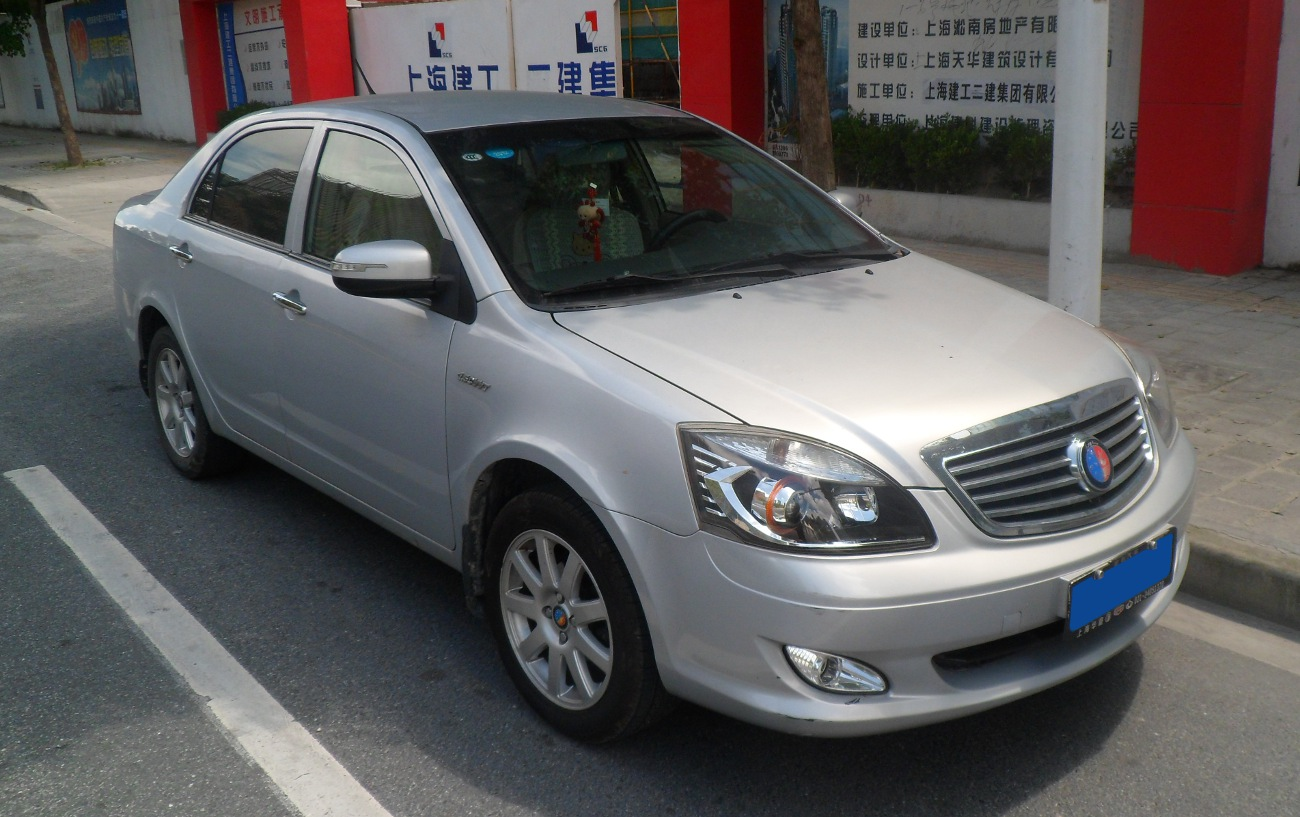

Overview
- Manufacturer: Englon (Geely Auto)
- Production: 2010–2015 (Geely); 2009–2010 (SMA)
- Model years: 2010–2015
- Assembly: Ningbo, Zhejiang, China

Body and chassis
- Class: compact car (C)
- Body style: 4-door sedan
- Layout: Front-engine, front-wheel-drive
- Related: Geely Yuanjing

Powertrain
- Engine: 1.8L DVVT Engine; 1.5L DVVT Engine
- Transmission: 5-speed manual 6-speed automatic

Dimensions
- Wheelbase: 2,602 mm (102.4 in)
- Length: 4,682 mm (184.3 in)
- Width: 1,725 mm (67.9 in)
- Height: 1,485 mm (58.5 in)

Geely Haijing, which was developed from SMA Haijing, is one of the flagship commercial automobile produced by Chinese car manufacturer Geely Auto. It was introduced in 2009 by Shanghai Maple Motors, later renamed Englon SC7 or Englon Haijing. The Haijing equipped 2 front parking sensors and 4 rear parking sensors. The high match models are powered with 1.8T engine with 6-speed automatic transmission produced by Australian gearbox manufacturer Drivetrain Systems International.

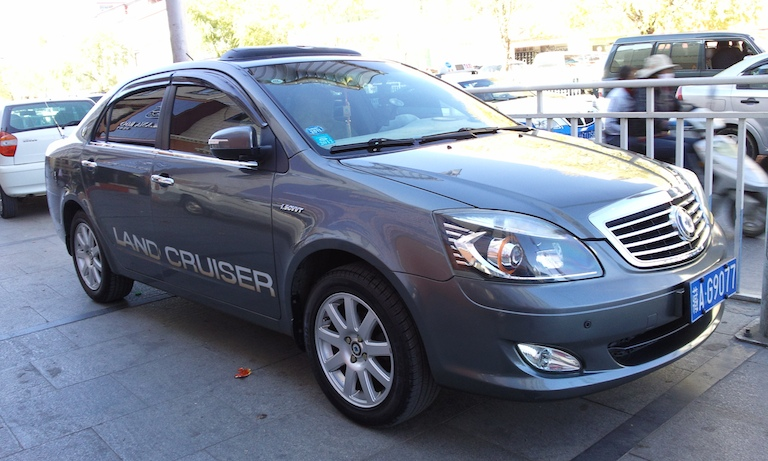
Shanghai Maple Haijing

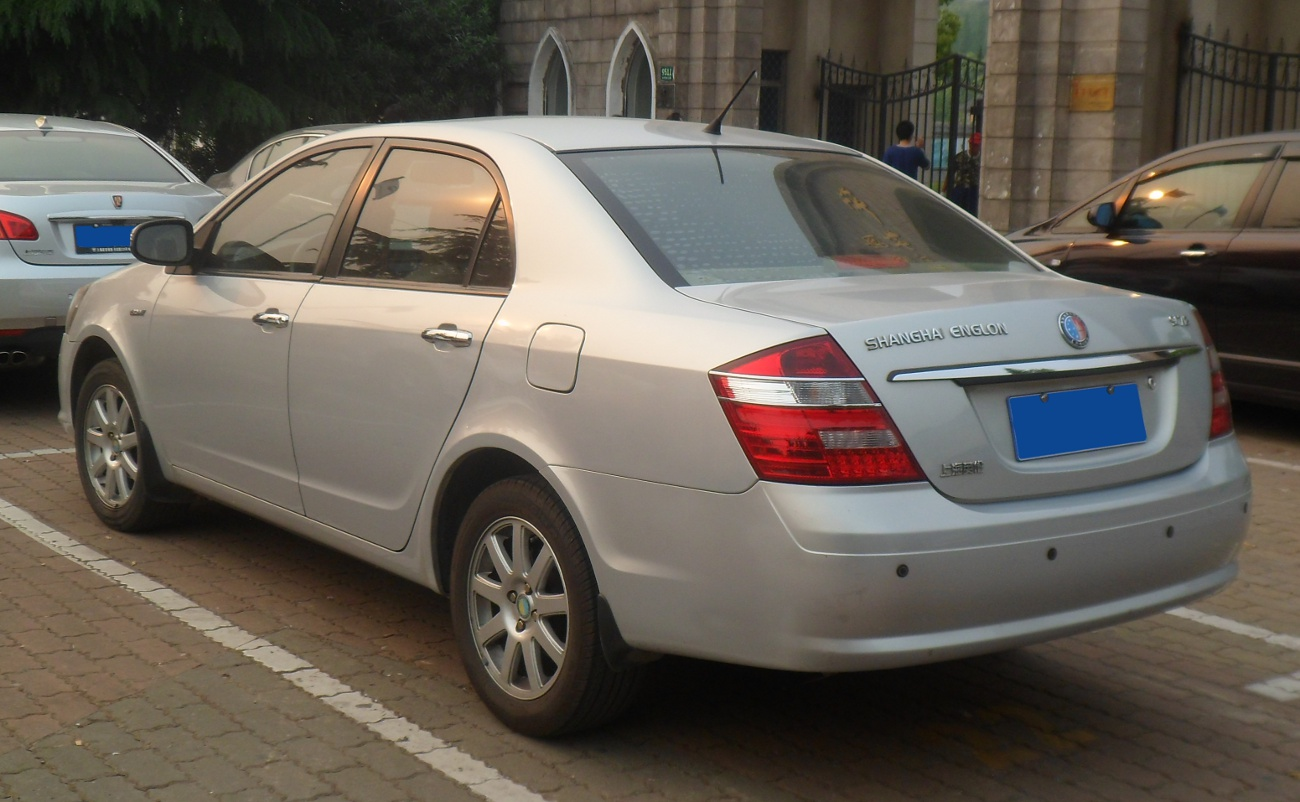
Shanghai-Englon SC7 (rear)

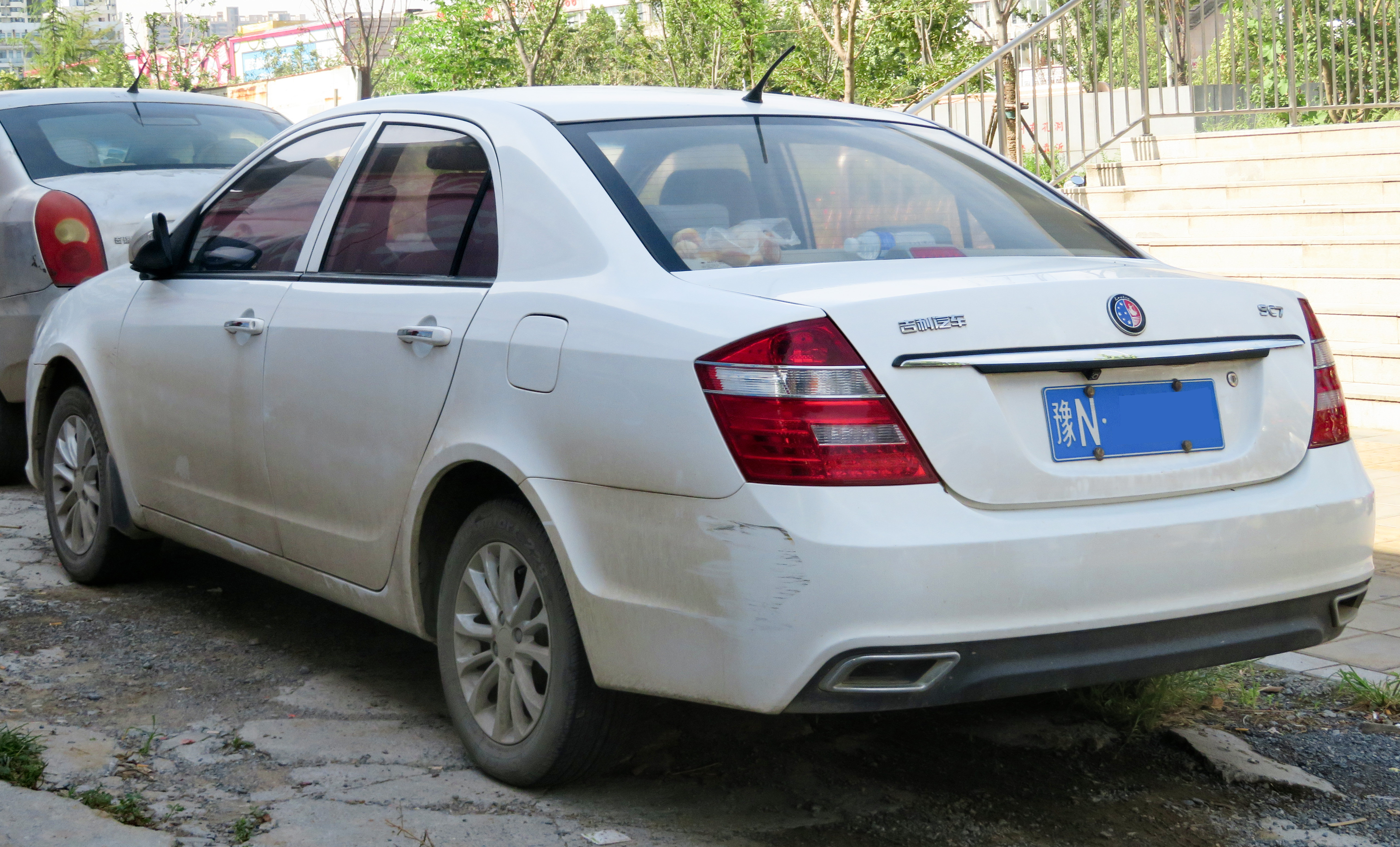
Englon SC7 Haijing (rear)

== Second generation (FC2; 2013-2018) ==
Geely Yuanjing
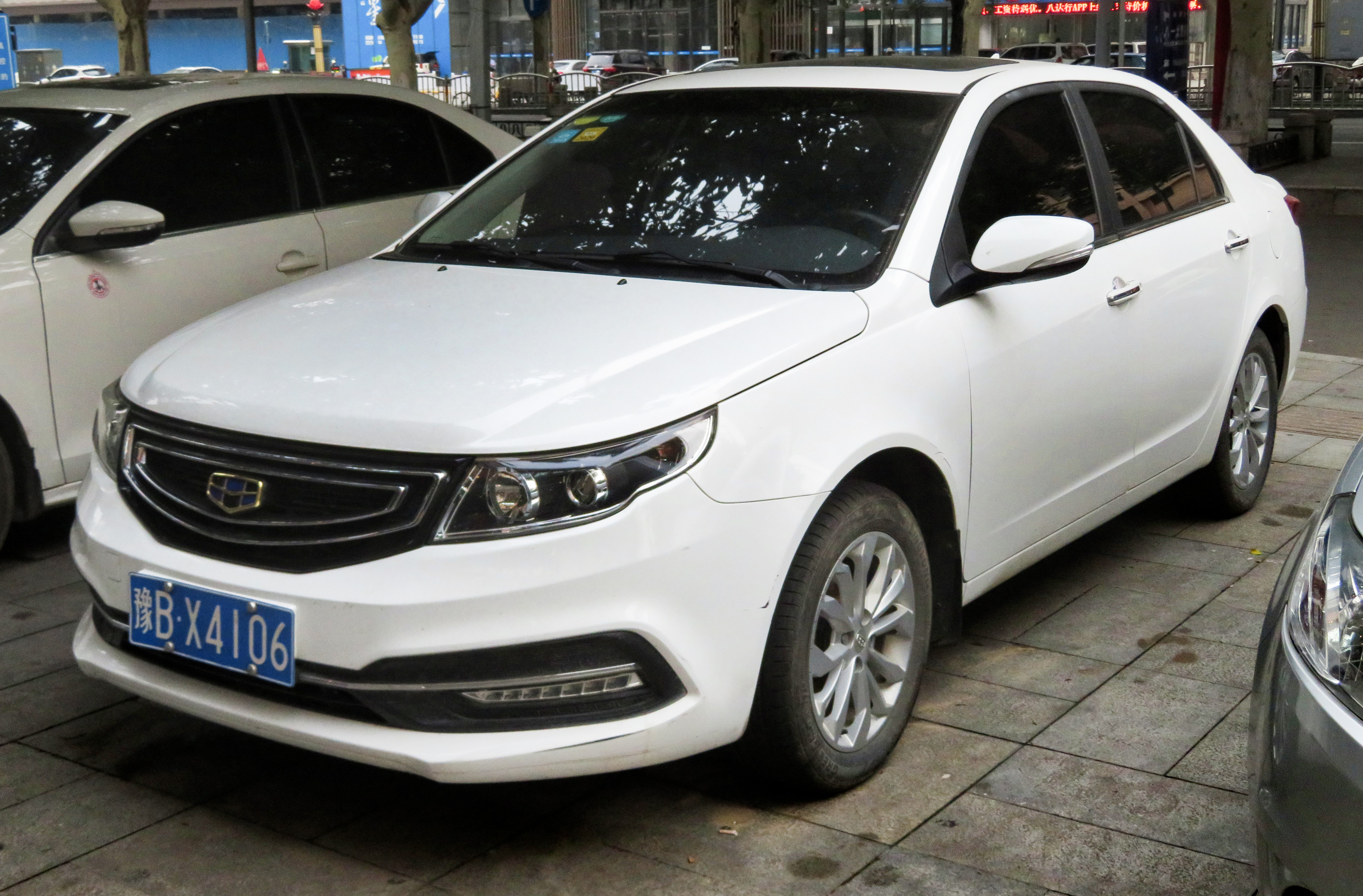
- Post-facelift Geely Yuanjing

Overview
- Manufacturer: Geely Auto
- Also called: GLEagle GC7
- Production: 2013–2017

Body and chassis
- Class: compact car (C)
- Body style: 4-door sedan
- Layout: Front-engine, front-wheel-drive

Dimensions
- Wheelbase: 2,600 mm (102.4 in)
- Length: 4,590 mm (180.7 in)
- Width: 1,734 mm (68.3 in)
- Height: 1,470 mm (57.9 in)

The Geely Yuanjing sedan went through a few facelifts with code names FC, FC2, and the FC3 launched in late 2017. The side profile closely resembles the Toyota Corolla from the 2000s throughout the FC, FC2, and FC3 facelifts. The FC2 has completely redesigned front and rear DRGs which requires new front and rear fenders. However, the rest of the vehicle especially the side profile remains unchanged due to the base being the old FC platform. The FC2 is sometimes referred as the second generation Geely Yuanjing or Geely Yuanjing II.

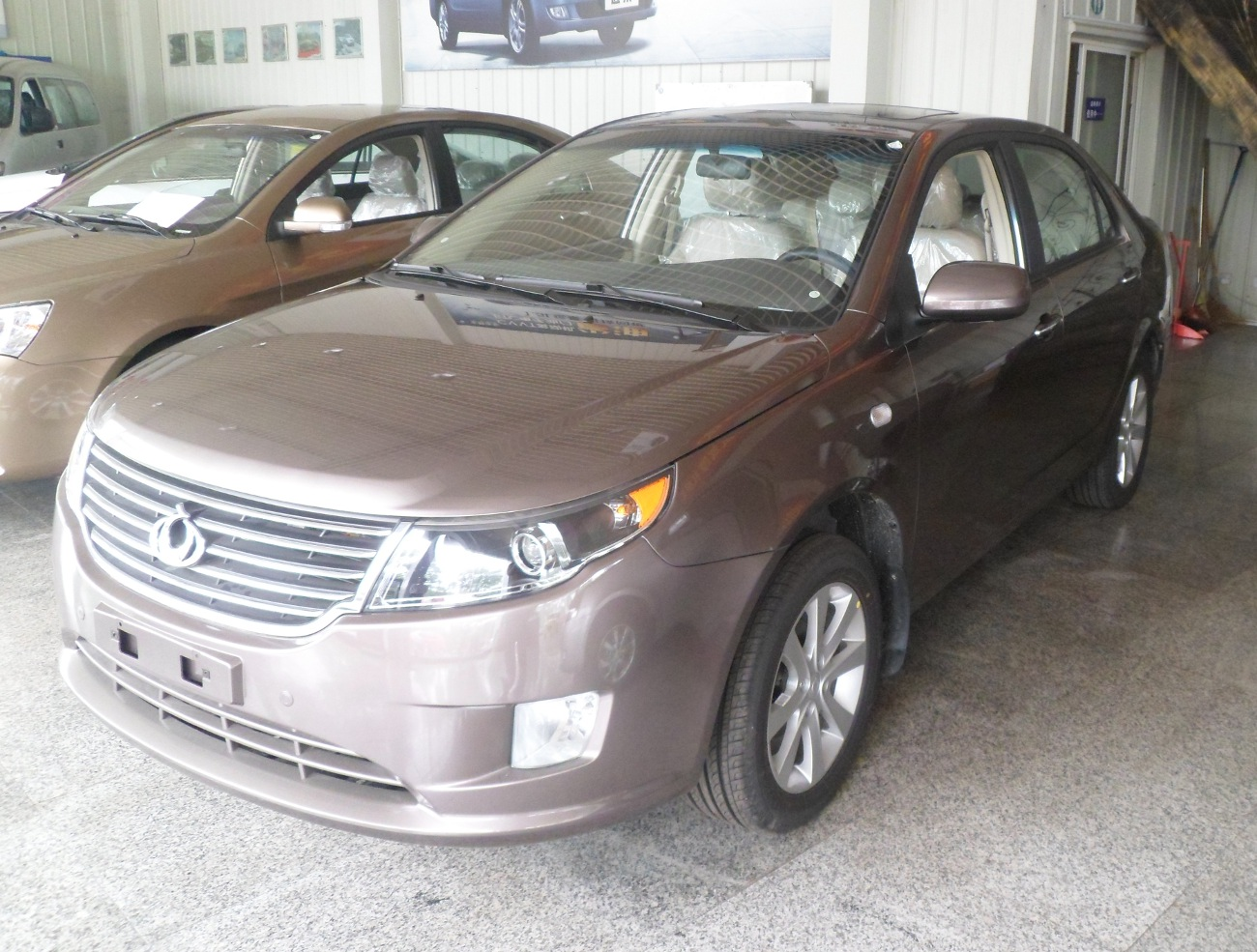
Gleagle GC7 sedan (FC2)

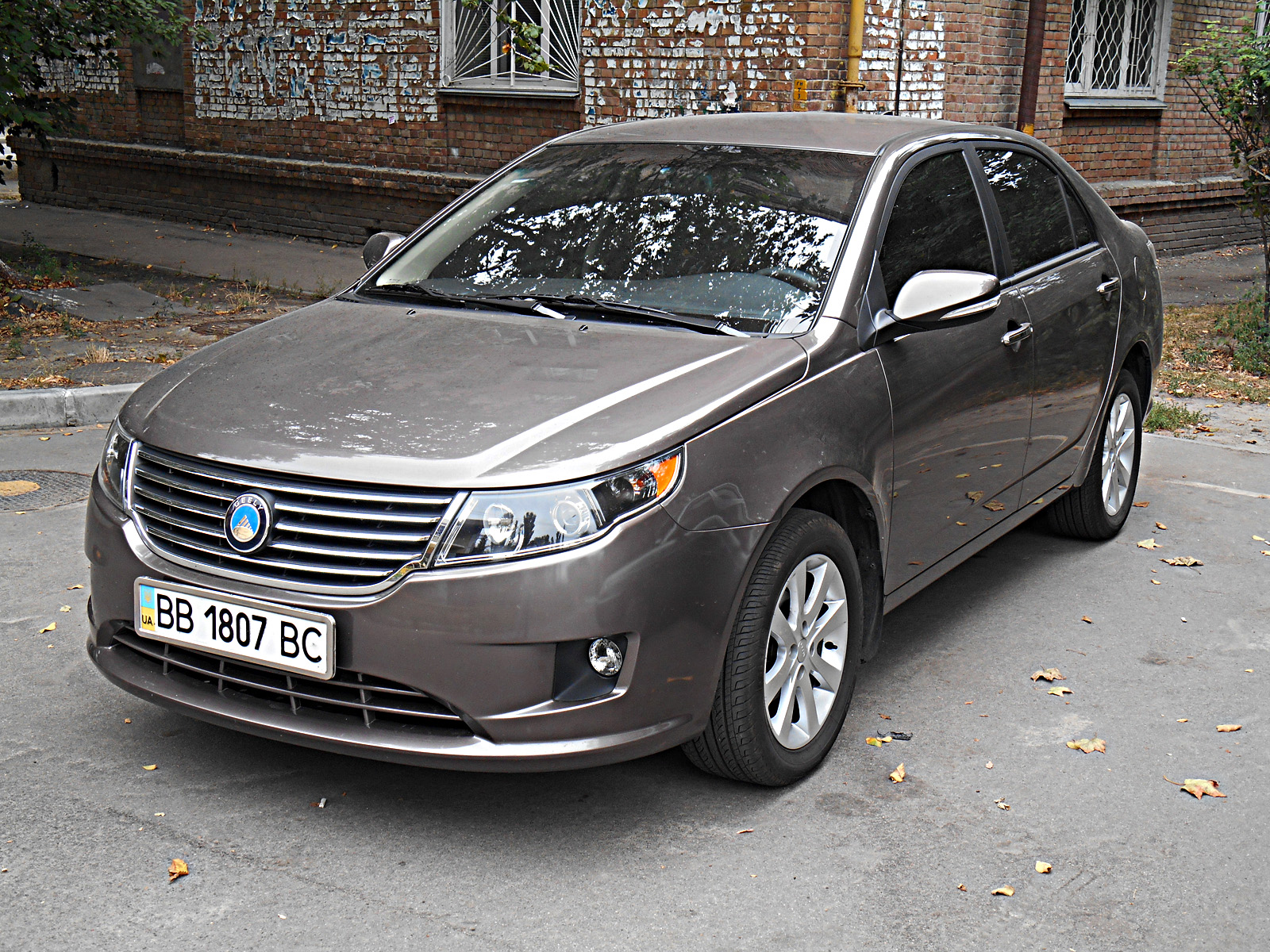
Geely GC7 sedan (FC2)

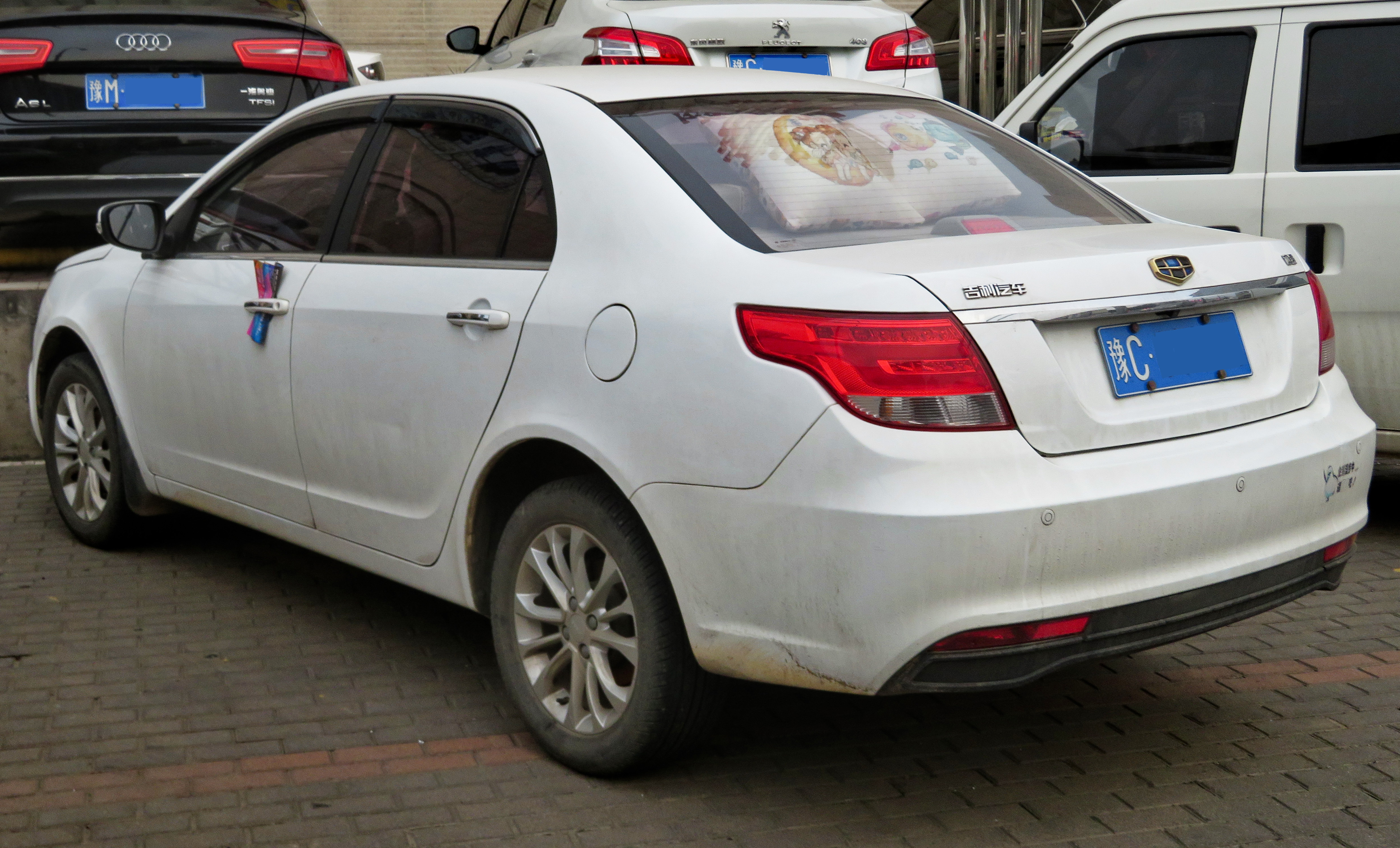
Geely Yuanjing II rear (FC2)

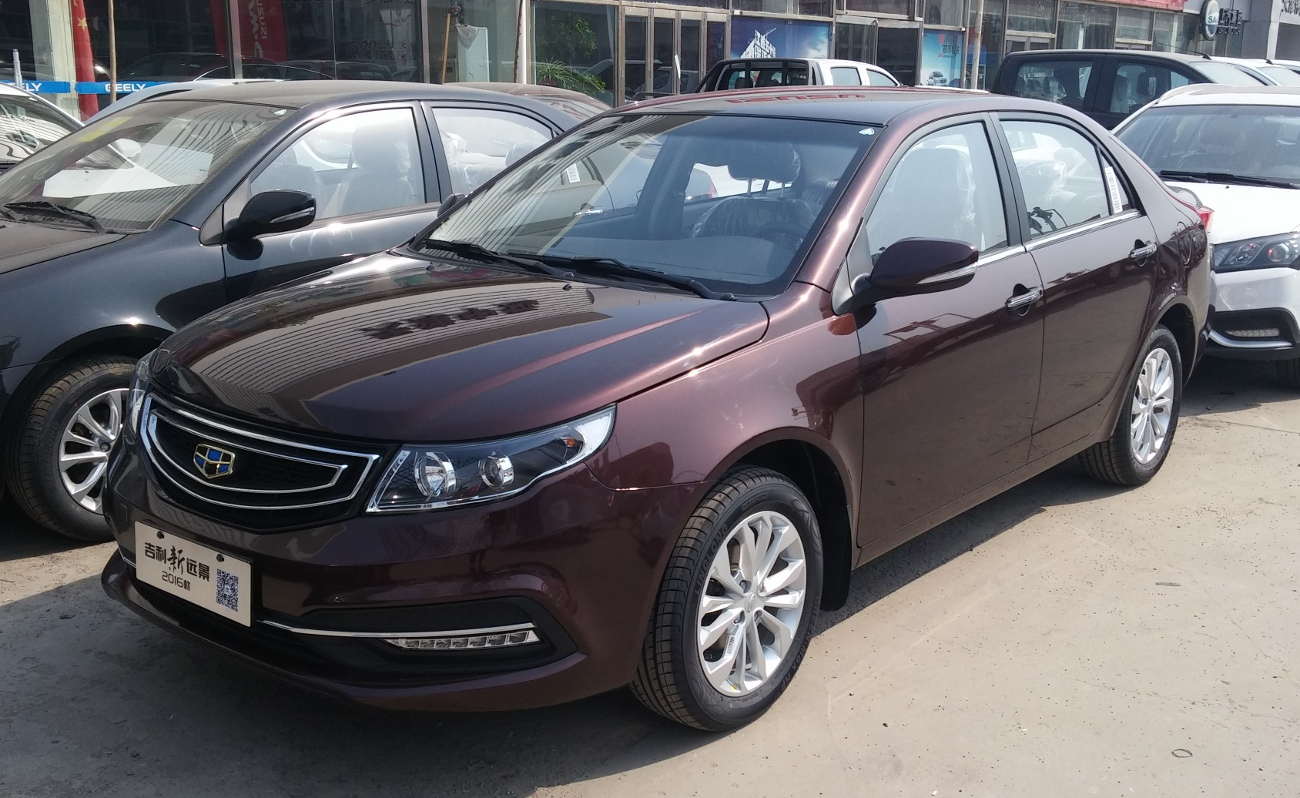
Geely Yuanjing II front (FC2) facelift

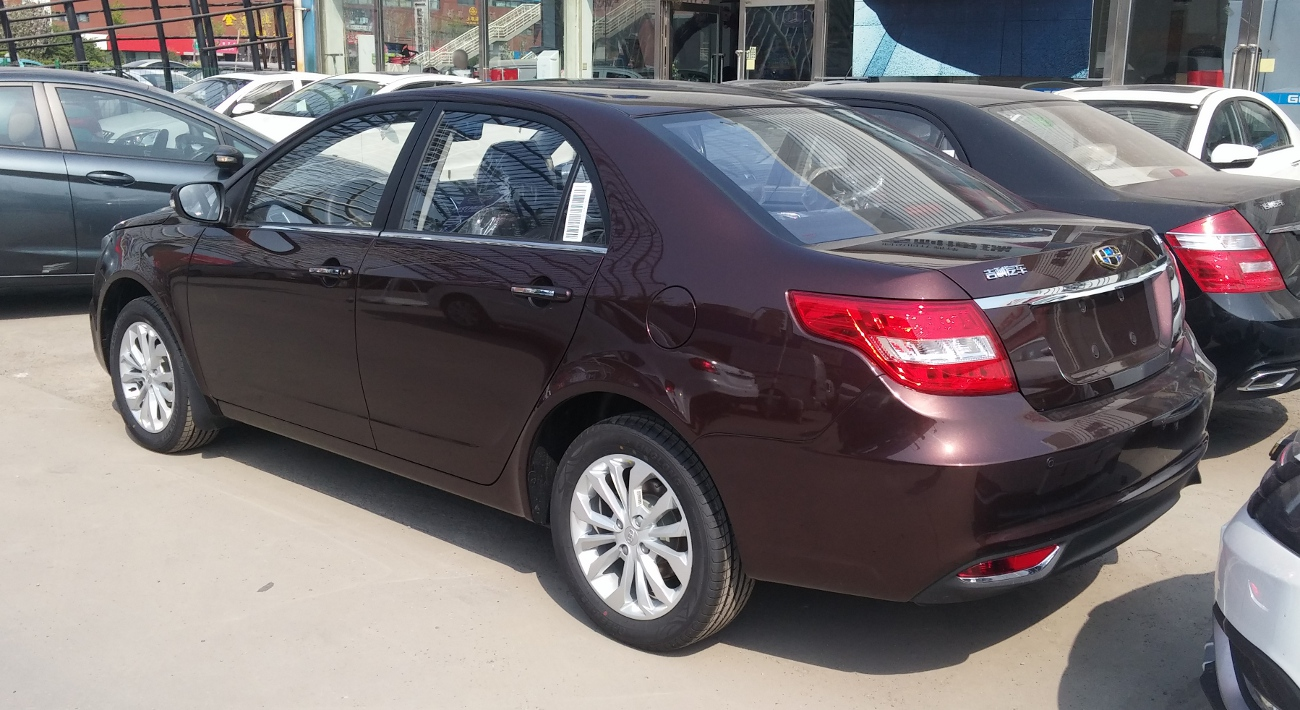
Geely Yuanjing II rear (FC2) facelift

== Third generation (FC3; 2018-2021) ==
Geely Yuanjing
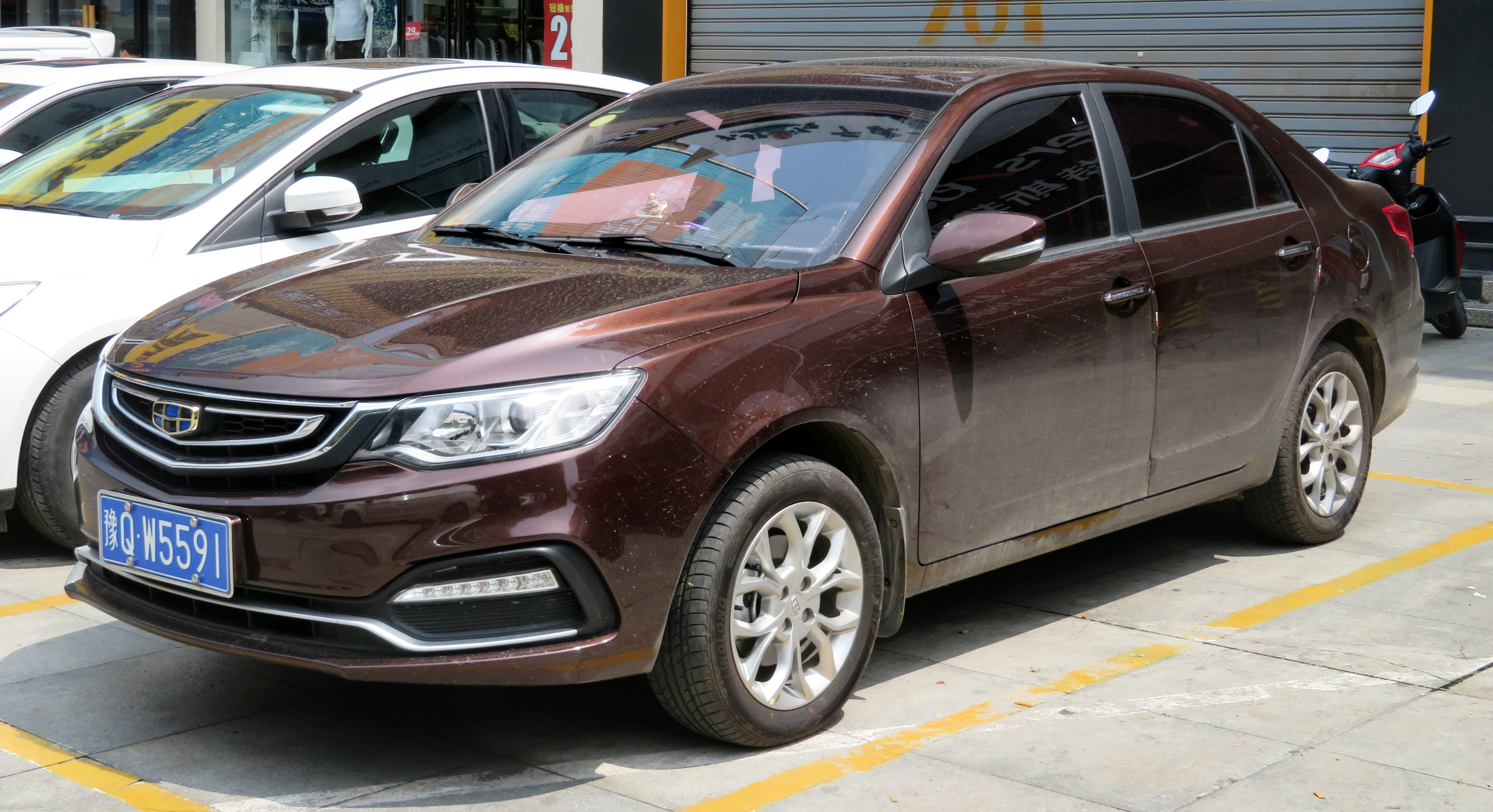
- 2018 Geely Yuanjing

Overview
- Manufacturer: Geely Auto
- Production: 2018–2021
- Model years: 2018–2020
- Assembly: China

Body and chassis
- Body style: 4-door sedan

The second facelift was done in late 2017, code-named the FC3. Just like the previous facelift, the platform remains unchanged, and this time the old front and rear fenders of the FC2 were also preserved as the edge of the front and tail lamps remains unchanged. Changes on the front are subtile while the tail lamp was redesigned to be positioned horizontally and keeping the original boundaries of the FC2 generation, the rear license plate was also moved downwards onto the rear bumper. The FC3 is sometimes referred to as the third generation Geely Yuanjing or Geely Yuanjing III.

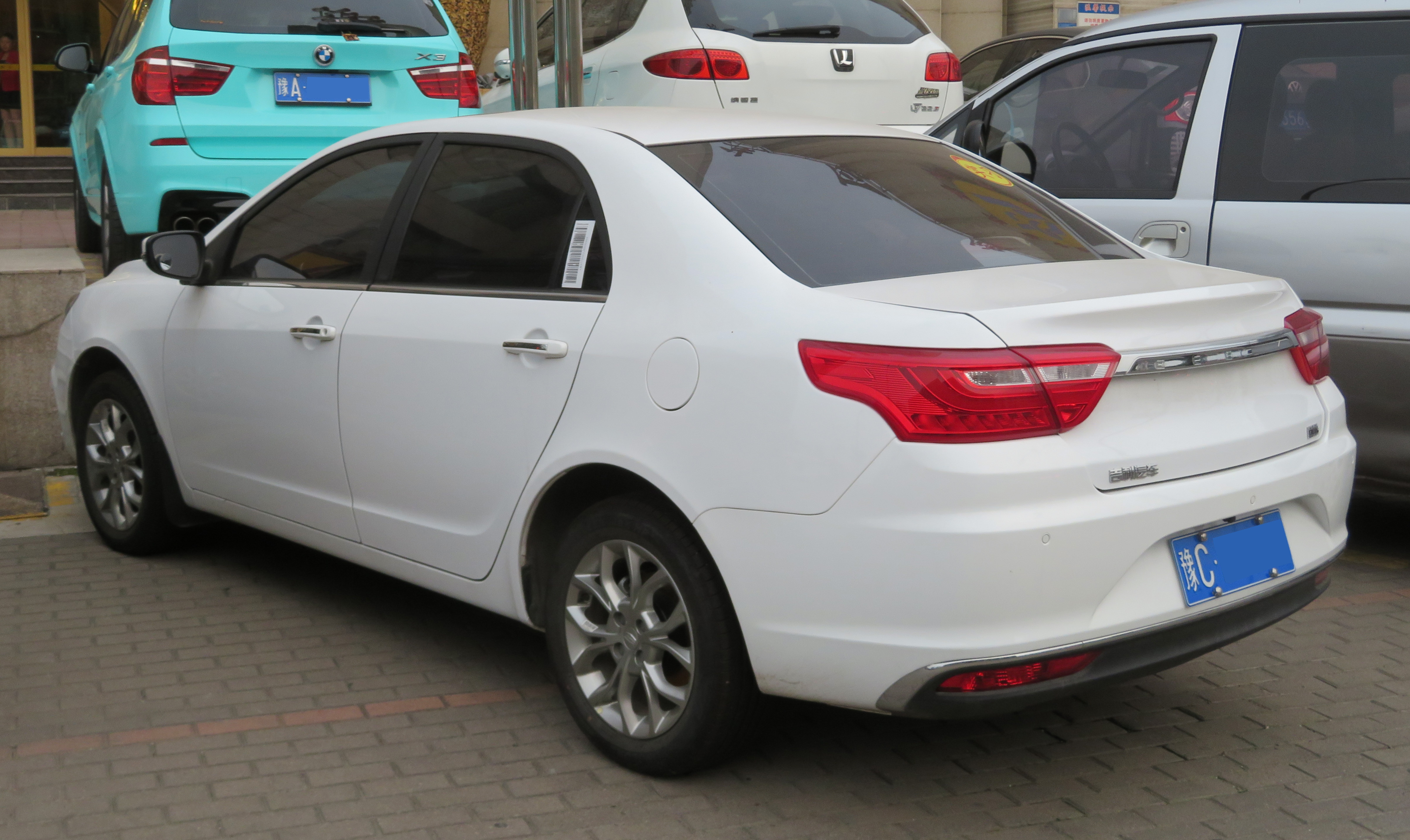
Geely Yuanjing III (FC3) rear
