= GV =

GV or gv may refer to:

== Businesses and organizations ==
- GV (company), formerly Google Ventures
- Aero Flight (IATA airline designator)
- Globovisión, a Venezuelan news network
- Golden Village, a movie theater chain in Singapore
- Grand Valley State University, in Michigan, USw
- General Union of Public Sector and Transport Workers, former trade union in Germany
- Global Voices, non-profit organization

== People ==
- Gianni Versace, fashion designer
- King George V of the United Kingdom
- Getúlio Vargas, former Brazilian president
- Gore Vidal, American author
- Gino Vannelli, Canadian musician
- G. V. Prakash Kumar, Indian composer and actor

== Places ==
- Grass Valley, California
- Greenfield Village, a part of The Henry Ford, a national landmark located in Dearborn, Michigan
- Green Valley (disambiguation)

== Vehicles ==
- Gulfstream V business jet
- Lockheed GV, an early designation of the KC-130F Hercules aircraft
- Suzuki Grand Vitara, an automobile
- Yugo GV, an automobile

== Other uses ==
- GV (nerve agent)
- Google Voice, a mobile voice application
- Manx language (ISO 639 alpha-2 code)
- Ghostview, a front end for PostScript rasteriser software for Linux/X
- Grapevine viroid, a plant disease
- Gigavolt

== See also ==
- G5 (disambiguation), including a list of topics named G.V, etc.
