= Moskvitch DM =

The Moskvitch DM (also known as UMZ-412 or UZAM-412) was an automobile engine developed by Avtomobilny Zavod imeni Leninskogo Komsomola (Lenin Komsomol Automobile Factory, AZLK) under the Moskvitch brand, for the Moskvich 412.

Design of the 1,478 cc (90.2 cu in) DM began in response to the increasing power of Western Europe's competitors to the just-introduced Moskvitch 408. The existing engine's displacement could not be enlarged profitably, so the AZLK team, led by Igor Okunev, started with a clean sheet. It had a very stiff five-bearing crankshaft, and a very high-mounted camshaft (resembling the Hillman Avenger). Oknuev, drawing on his experience in motorcycles, saw he could eliminate pushrods and raise the top rev limit, to 5,800 from the earlier engine's 4750.

The cam was chain-driven, and the block, head, sump, rocker cover, intake manifold, and other parts were aluminum. It weighed only 146 kg (322 lb), just 6 kg (13 lb) more than the previous 1,360 cc (83 cu in), but produced 75 hp (56 kW; 76 PS). It had removable cylinder liners, with both the aluminum oil pump and distributor driven off the crankshaft.

Prototype engines were delivered in 1964. It was tested in racing in summer 1966, before entering full production, in a higher tuned state, producing 92 hp (69 kW; 93 PS), in the Moskvitch G4M racer.

It was produced by Ufa Motorniy Avtomobilny Zavod (Ufa Automobile Engine Factory, UZAM), and the first production engine was completed 15 March 1966. It was first used in the Moskvitch 412 in March 1967. It was also supplied to IZH, which also assembled the 412.

The planned 1975 Moskvitch 356 was to use an enlarged 1,799 cc (109.8 cu in) version of the DM, with twin Zenith carburetors, giving 103 hp (77 kW; 104 PS). None was built.

This was followed by the 1975 four door fastback Moskvitch C1 (Series One), with a 1,702 cc (103.9 cu in) version of the DM, offering 81 hp (60 kW; 82 PS). It inspired the Moskvitch C3, which was very similar but a five-door hatchback. The engine would have been fitted at an angle from the vertical (like the Chrysler slant six). Neither project reached production.

== Sources ==
- Thompson, Andy. Cars of the Soviet Union. Somerset, UK: Haynes Publishing, 2008.
