= Gleagle =

Automobile brand

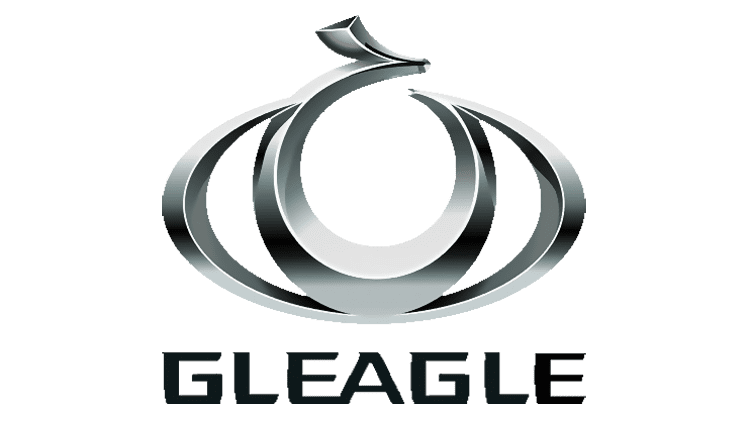
- Current owner: Geely
- Introduced: 2008
- Discontinued: 2014 (pre-restruction); 2016 (bankruptcy)
- Markets: China

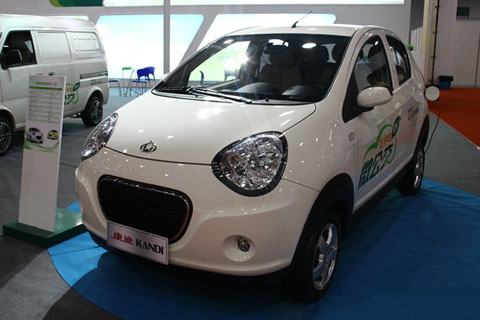
Here, the former Gleagle logo can be seen on a Geely LC, which was also sold under that brand name.

Gleagle (Chinese: 全球鹰; pinyin: Quánqiú Yīng) was an entry-level brand of automobiles manufactured by Geely. Some Gleagle cars, such as the Gleagle Panda, were available for sale on the Internet in China via the Taobao Mall, a popular e-commerce site. While Geely would deliver the car to the customer's address, buying one of the Panda models on offer did necessitate a trip to a traditional dealer. This sub-brand was discontinued in 2015; most products continued to be sold directly under the Geely brand.

== History ==
The Geely group from Hangzhou introduced this brand for automobiles at the end of 2008. The other brands Englon and Emgrand followed in June and July 2009, respectively. In 2014, Geely announced that it would phase out these three brands and would once again sell all vehicles under the brand Geely expel. In 2015, this restructuring was still ongoing and completed in 2016.

== Products ==
Products sold under the Gleagle brand include:

- 2008–2016 Gleagle Panda (熊猫) 1.0 L & 1.3 L CVVT hatchback, also known as the Geely LC
- 2010 Gleagle GX2 (Panda Cross) 1.3 L & 1.5 L
- 2011 Gleagle CK 1.0 L & 1.5 L, a rebadging of the Geely CK
- 2012 Gleagle GC7 1.8 L four-door sedan
- 2012 Gleagle GX7 compact SUV
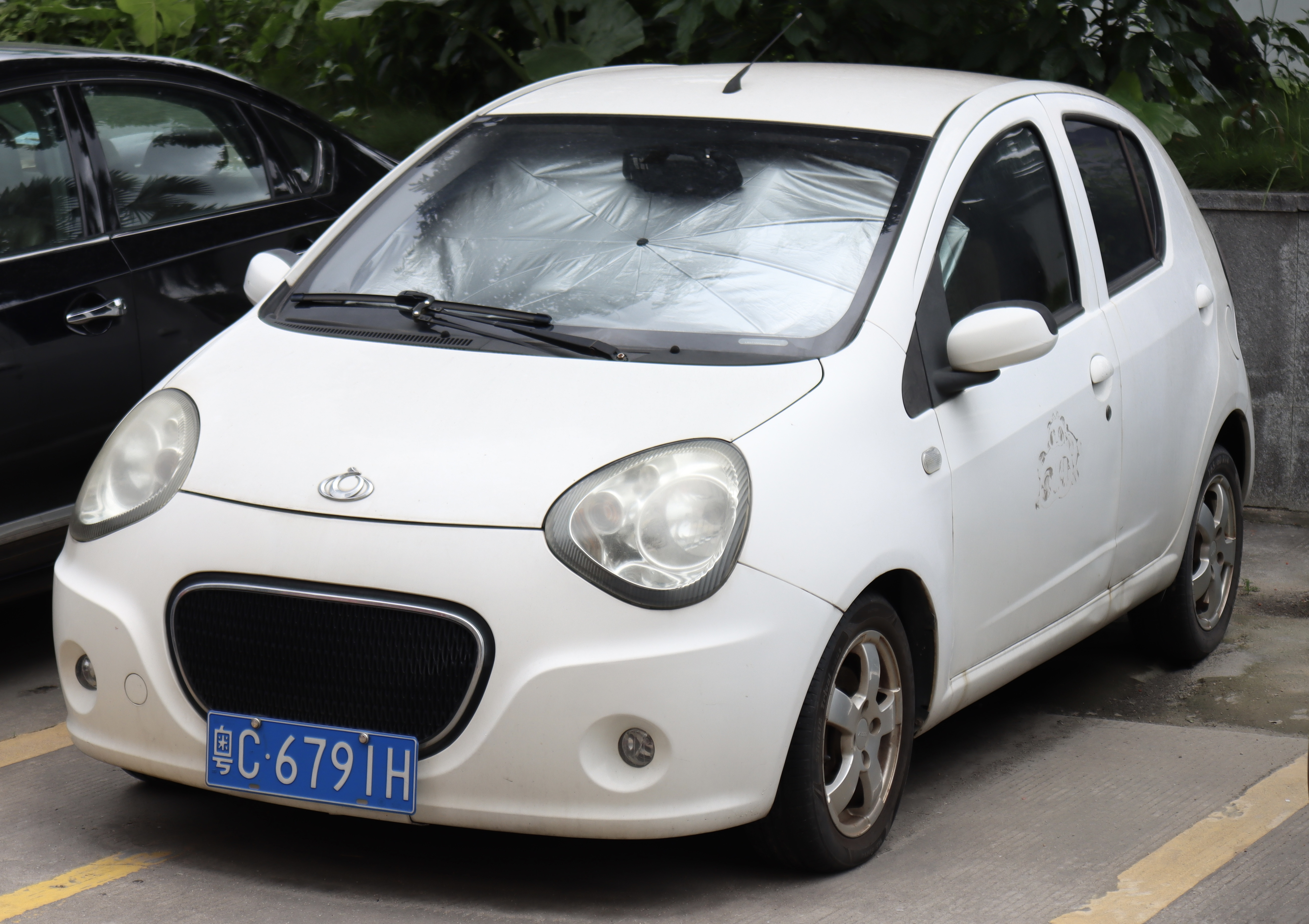
Gleagle Panda

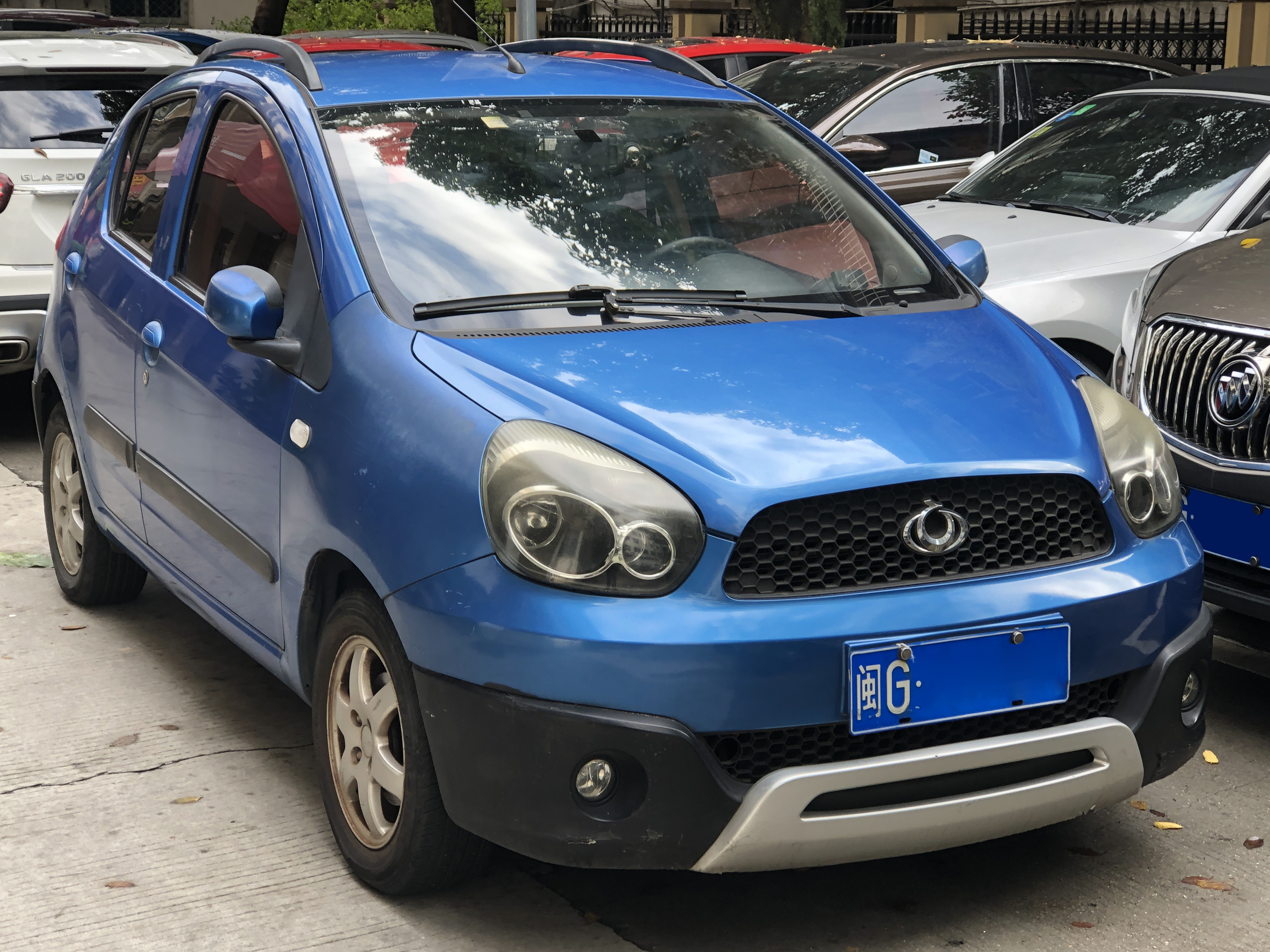
Gleagle GX2

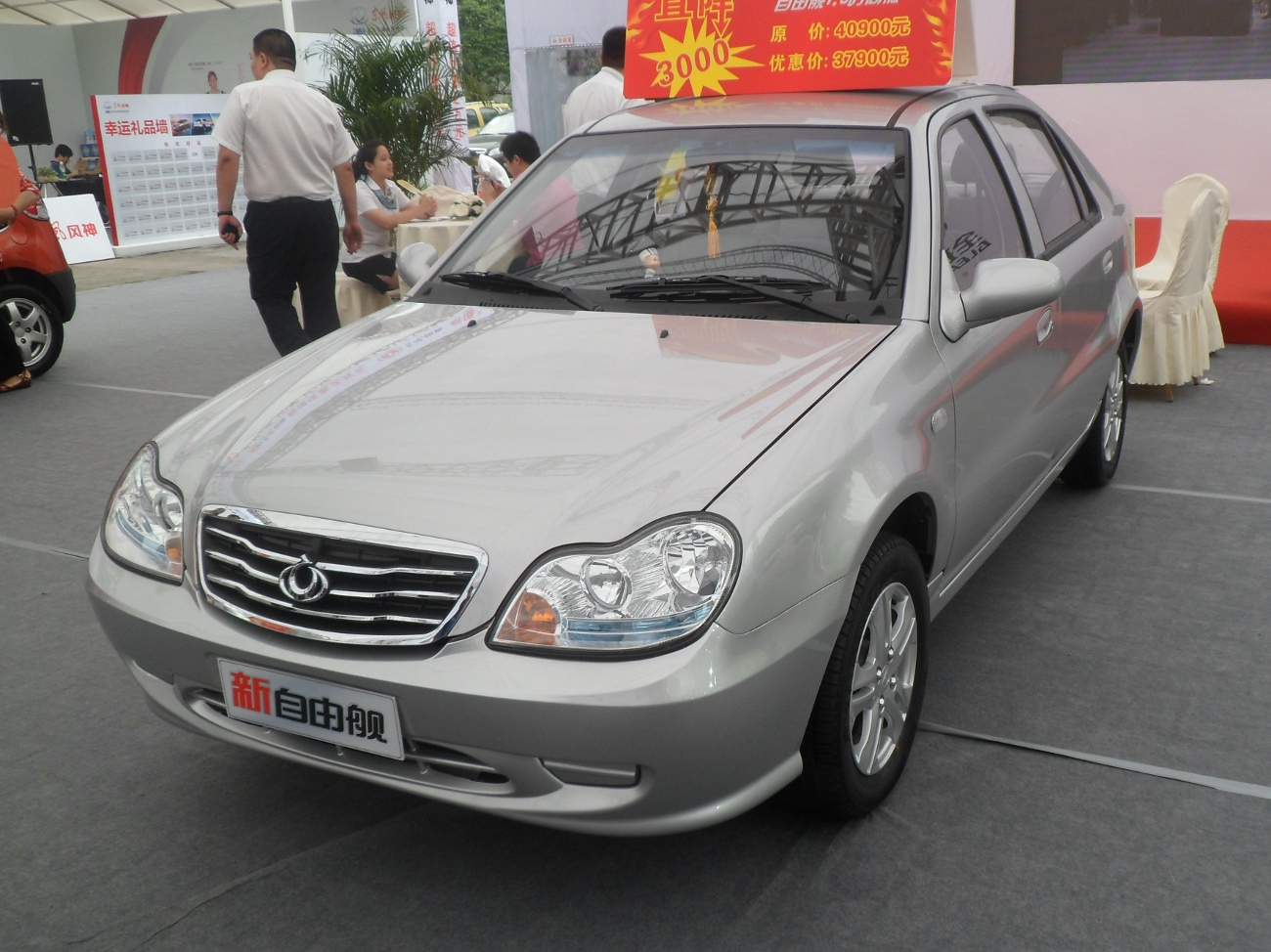
Gleagle Ziyoujian

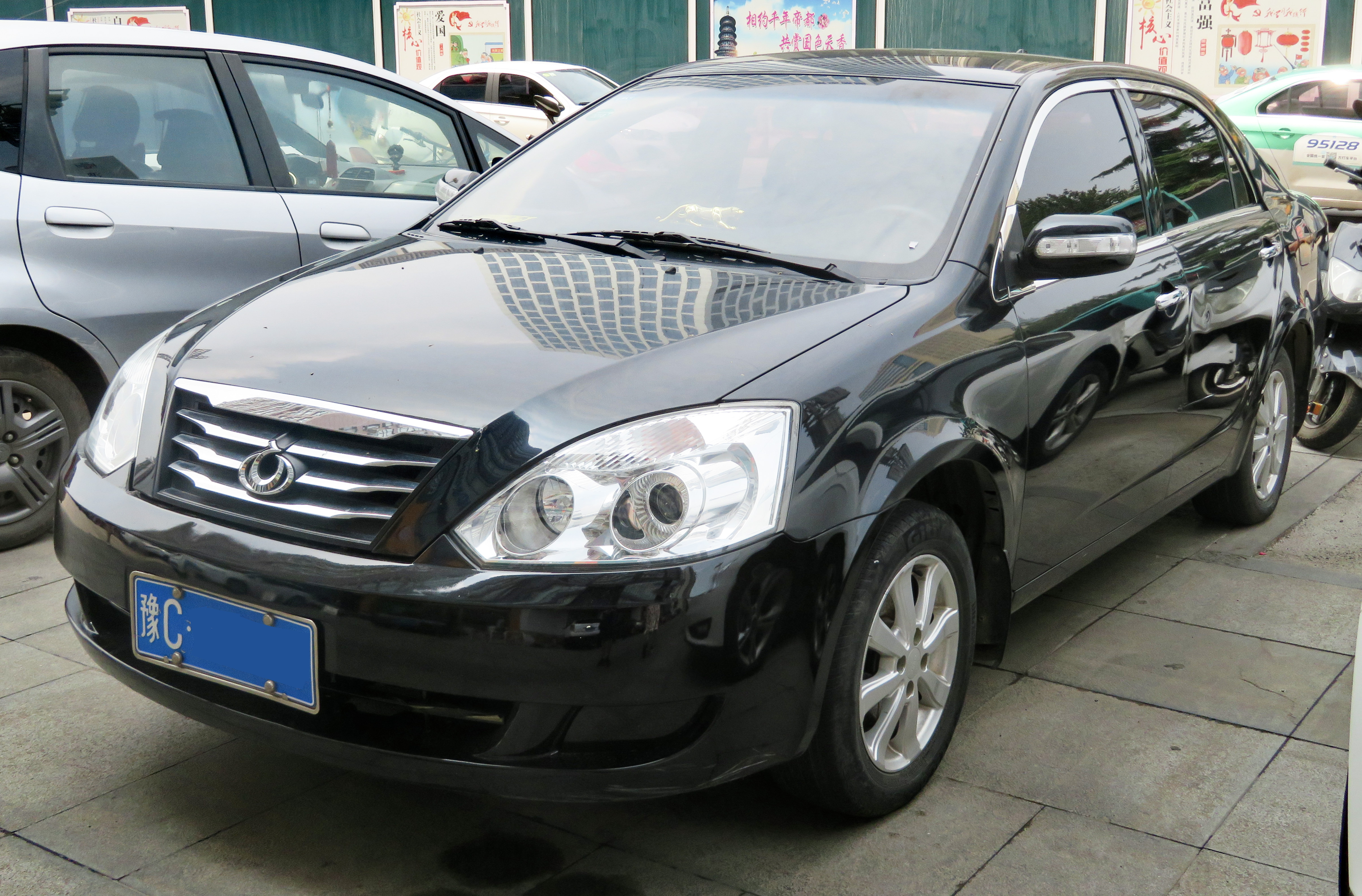
Gleagle Yuanjing

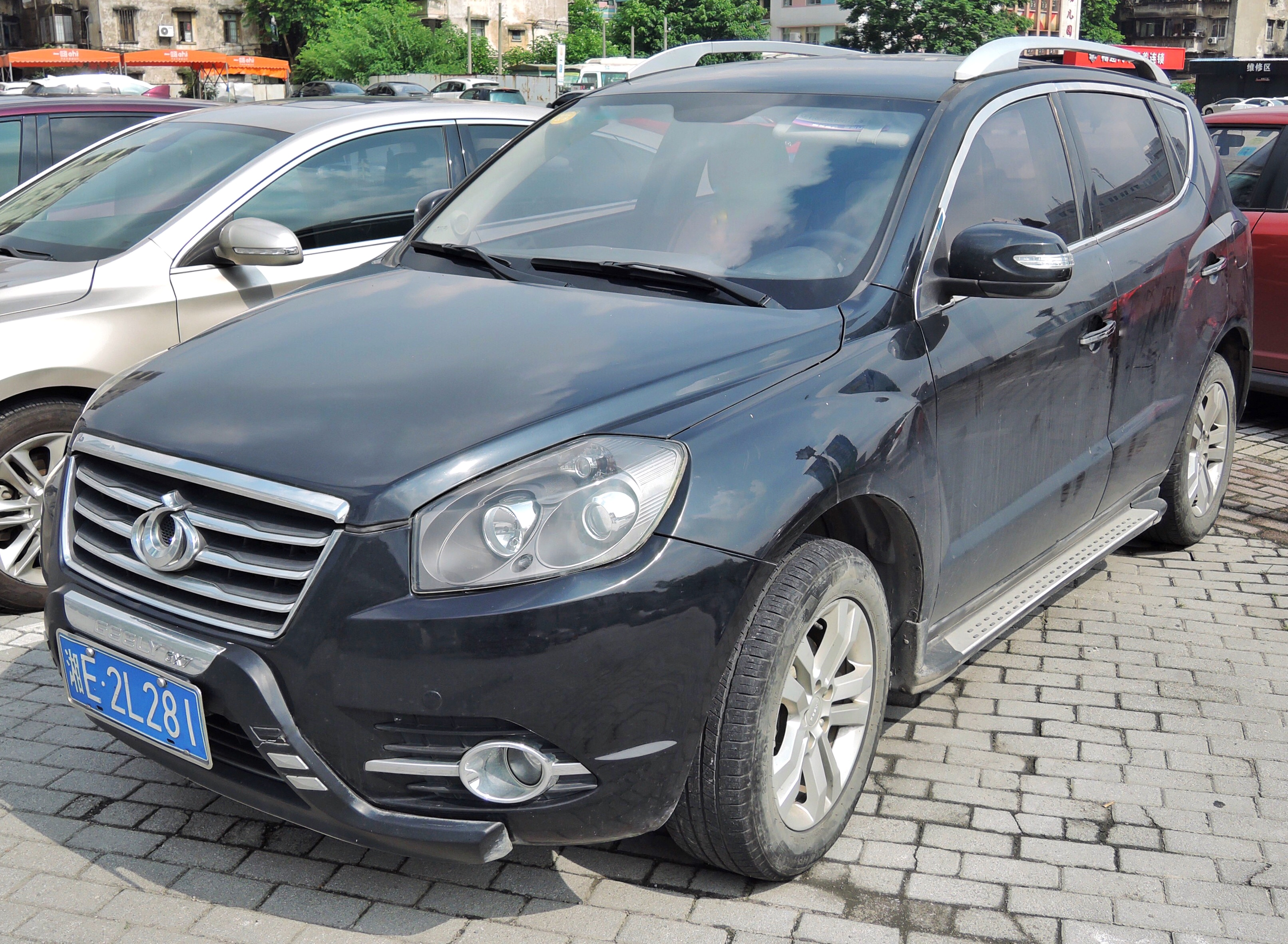
Gleagle GX7

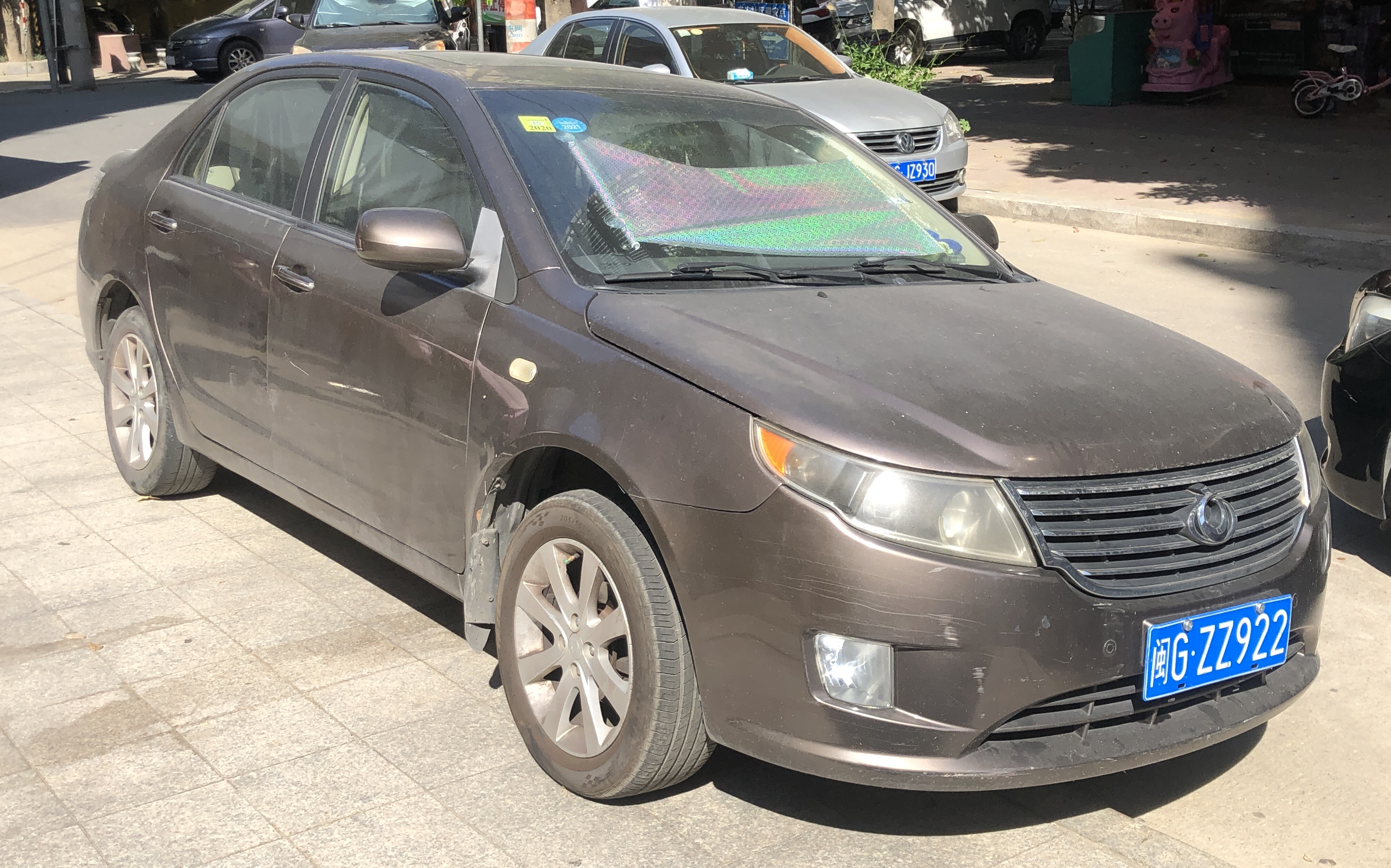
Gleagle GC7

== Statistics ==
In 2009 over 28,000 vehicles were sold. The following year the number rose to 199,198. In 2011 there were 177,730. In 2012, sales remained almost the same at 176,999 vehicles. No figures are known for the following years.

At the end of 2010, this brand had 363 car dealerships in China. One year later, it was 336, and next year 324.
