= Go Gawa poetry club =

19th-century poetry club in Edo, Japan

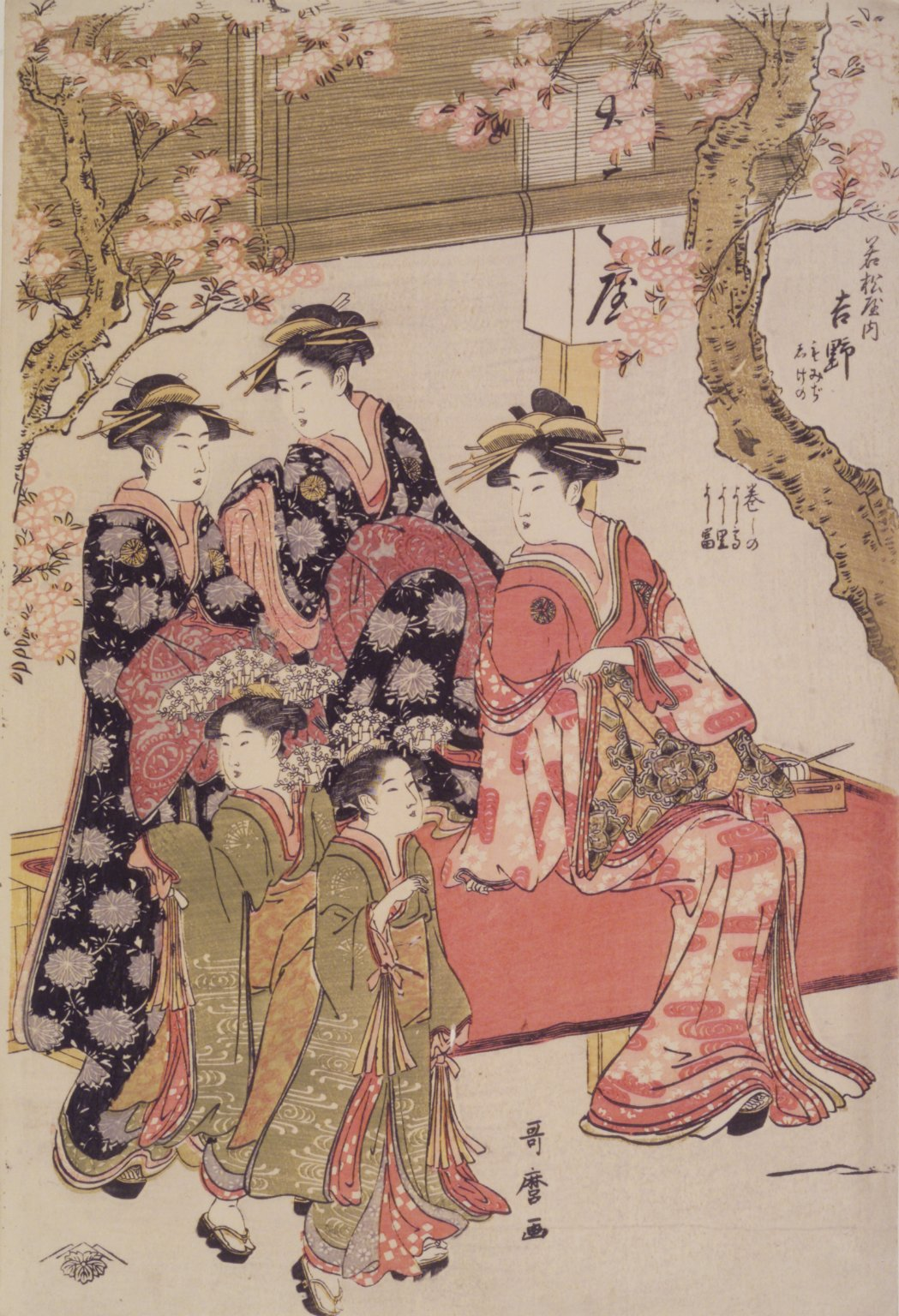
Courtesans Strolling Beneath Cherry Trees Before the Daikokuya Teahouse, probably 1789. Oban tate-e triptych, woodblock print, color on paper. Three courtesans and their kamuro (child attendants) and shinzo (apprentices) at the Daikokuya Teahouse. In the right-hand sheet, a tanzaku sheet hangs from the branches of the cherry tree with a poem by Yadoya Meshimori (1753-1830), later known as Rokujuen. Brooklyn Museum

The Go Gawa poetry club (Japanese 五側), also known as the Group of Five poetry club or Gogawa poetry group, was a famous poetry club in Edo, Japan, during the early 19th century. Artists working for the group often wrote poetry on illustrated surimono, and signed their work with the Go Gawa symbol, an hourglass resembling the number five. By 1836, the club had already met 1,600 times.

== History ==
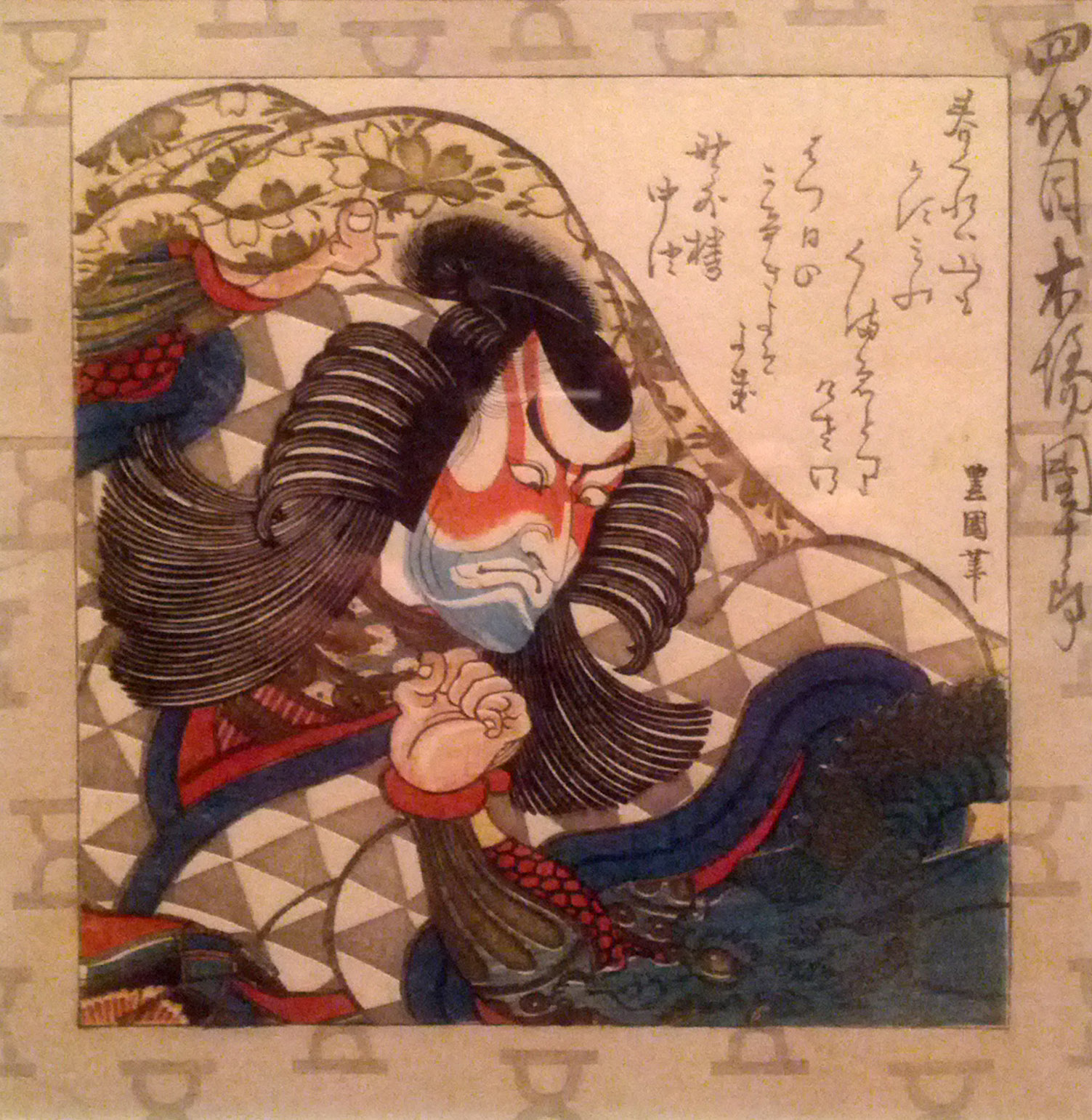
Surimono woodblock print by Utagawa Toyokuni I (1769-1825), depicting kabuki actor Ichikawa Danjuro in his portrayal of warrior Taira no Kagekiyo. Commissioned by the Go Gawa Club, c. 1820; now at the Museum of Fine Arts, Boston.

The club was associated with the Ichikawa acting family of Japan, and led by Rokujuen (Ichikawa Danjûro VII, also known as Ichikawa Masamochi or Yadoya Meshimori, 1753-1830). A kabuki actor, Rokujuen was also a scholar of Japanese classics, and translator of Chinese fables. Though earlier involved in Edo's artistic community, he had been banished from the town after a confrontation with authorities regarding his management of an inn.

Rokujuen returned to Edo at the beginning of the Bunka era in 1804. The first major surimono and kyōka anthology published by the group was called Shunkyōjō, and appeared in 1810. The anthology resembled actor's critiques known as hyōbanki. The Go Gawa club published another major anthology, called kyōka hyōbanki, in 1811 as a critique of other kyōka poets.

Kyōchōshi Fumimaro, a disciple of Rokujuen, continued to publish major anthologies for the Go Gawa club, including Haro no uta and Hajime no haro no kyōka-shū in 1816-17; both anthologies were themed around spring. Rokujuen disciple Tatei also published in affiliation with Go Gawa. The group continued to produce poetry and poetic anthems throughout the Bunsei and into the Tenpō eras.

== Famous artists ==
Hokusai pupil Sunayama Hôtei Gosei designed surimono for Go Gawa, which he adapted for the first syllable of his name. Totoya Hokkei, Yashima Gakutei, and famed Ukiyo-e artist Kunisada also designed surimono for the group.

== See also ==
- Ukiyo-e
- Schools of ukiyo-e artists
- Edo period Japanese poetry
