= BYD G5 =

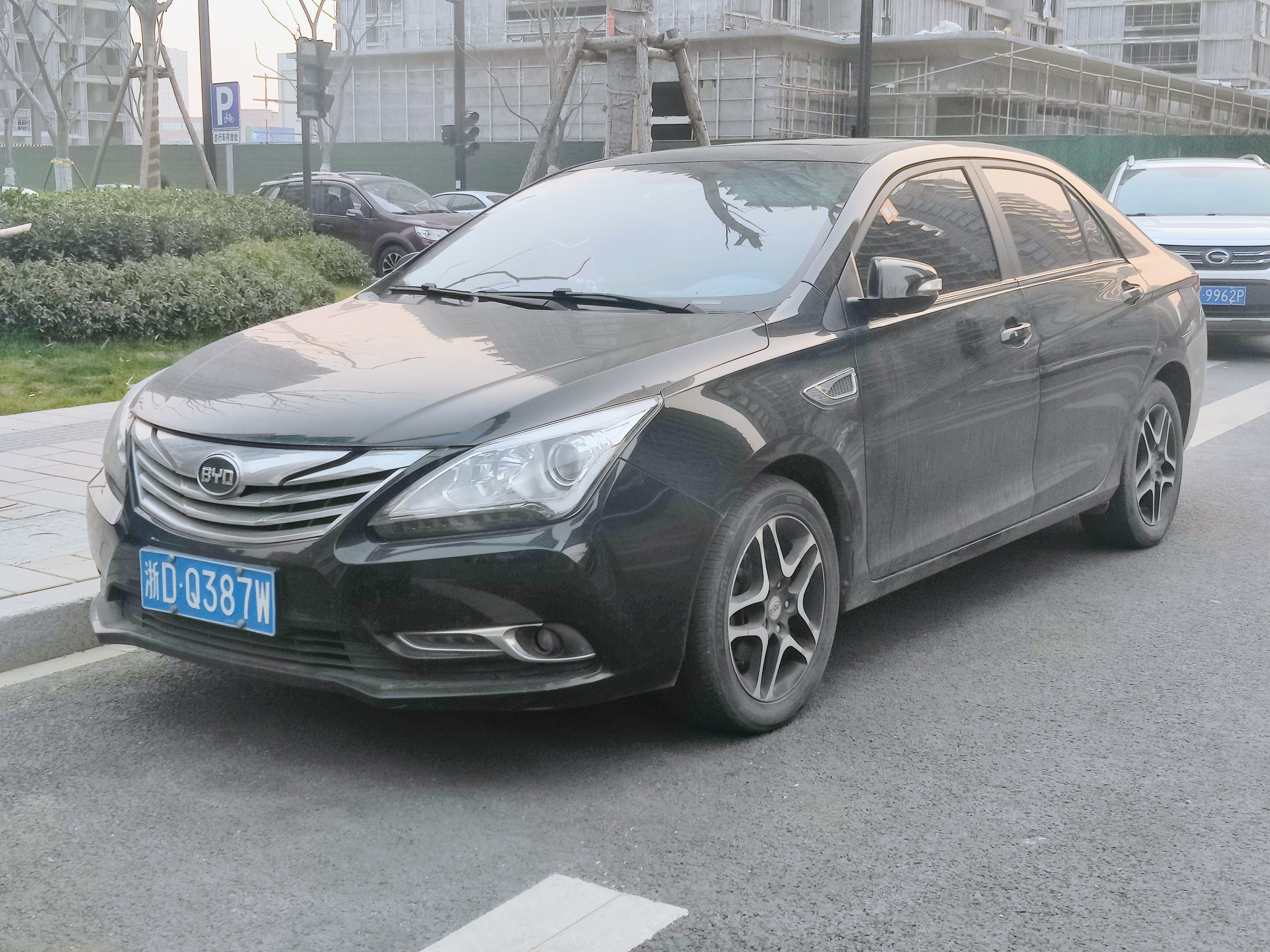

Overview
- Manufacturer: BYD
- Production: 2014–2017

Body and chassis
- Class: Compact car
- Body style: 4-door sedan
- Related: BYD F3; BYD Qin

Powertrain
- Engine: 1.5 L BYD476ZQA I4 (turbo petrol)
- Transmission: 6 speed manual 6 speed DCT

Dimensions
- Wheelbase: 2,670 mm (105.1 in)
- Length: 4,700 mm (185.0 in)
- Width: 1,790 mm (70.5 in)
- Height: 1,480 mm (58.3 in)

Chronology
- Predecessor: BYD G3

The BYD G5 is a compact sedan that was produced by the Chinese automaker BYD from 2014 to 2017. It replaced the BYD G3 car.

== Overview ==
The BYD G5 debuted at the April 2014 Beijing Auto Show and was launched in September 2014. Price ranges from 75.900 yuan to 102.900 yuan. Based on a stretched platform of the BYD F3, the BYD G5 is positioned slightly above the compact BYD F3 and below the mid-size BYD G6. A hybrid variant was expected to be revealed in 2015 with the hybrid drivetrain, the 1.5 L turbo, and a 149 hp (111 kW) and 200 N⋅m (148 lb⋅ft) electric motor.

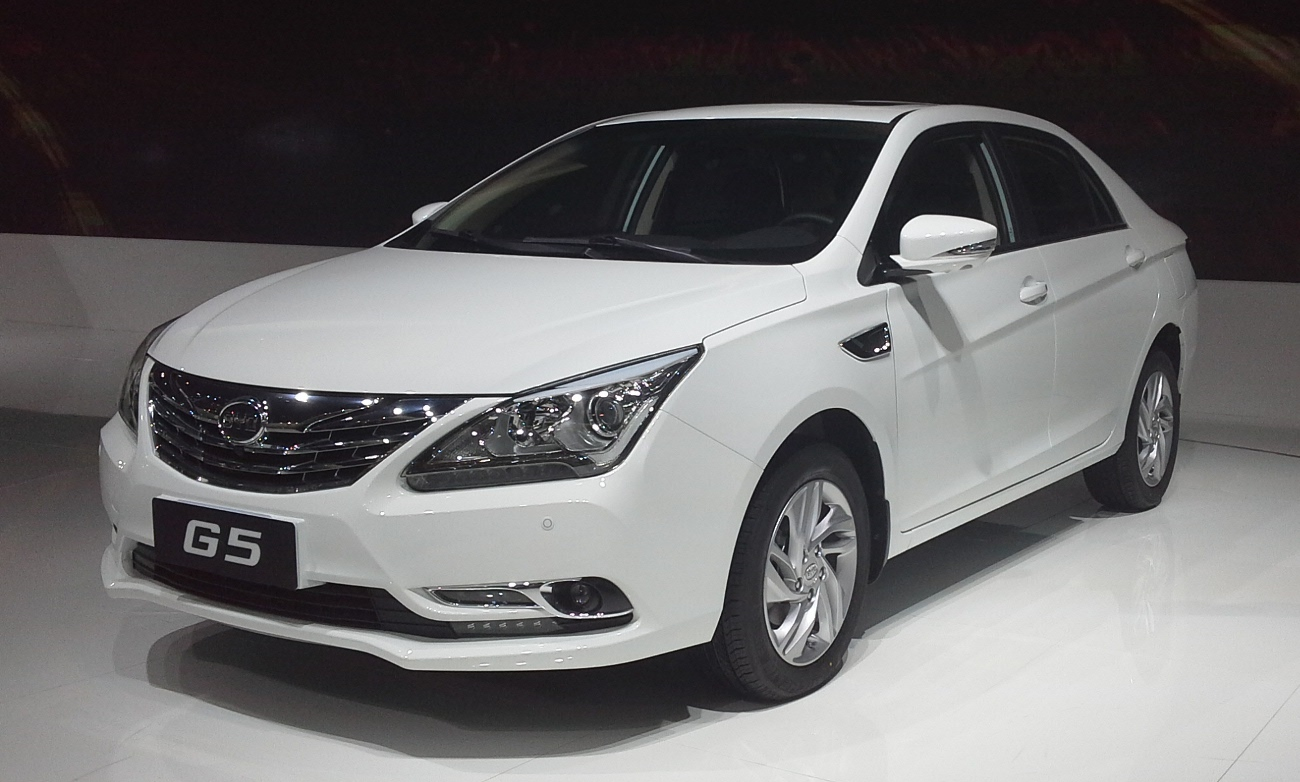
BYD G5 front

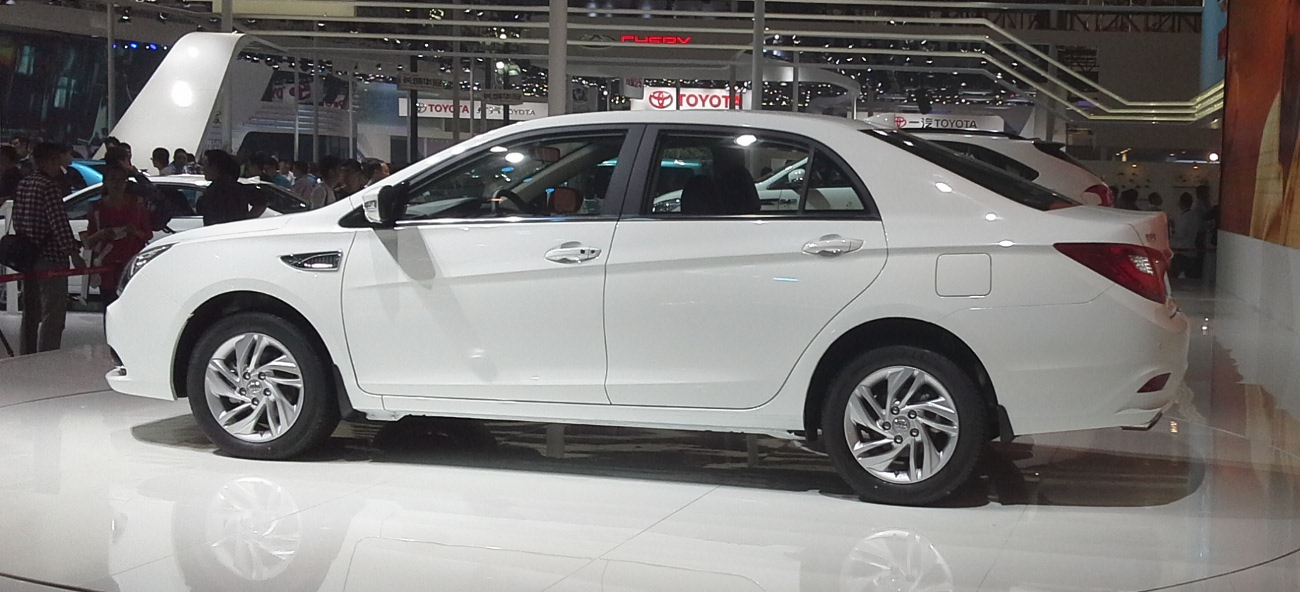
BYD G5 side

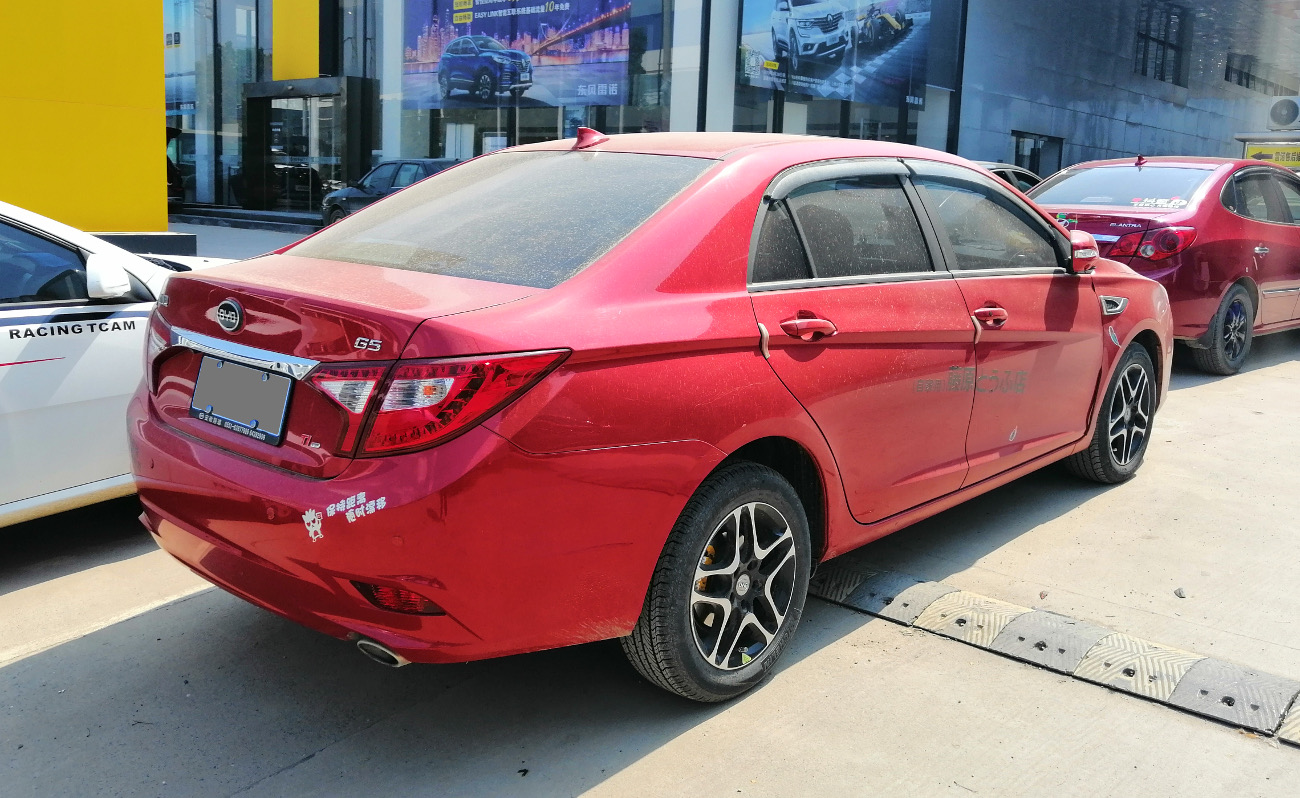
BYD G5 rear

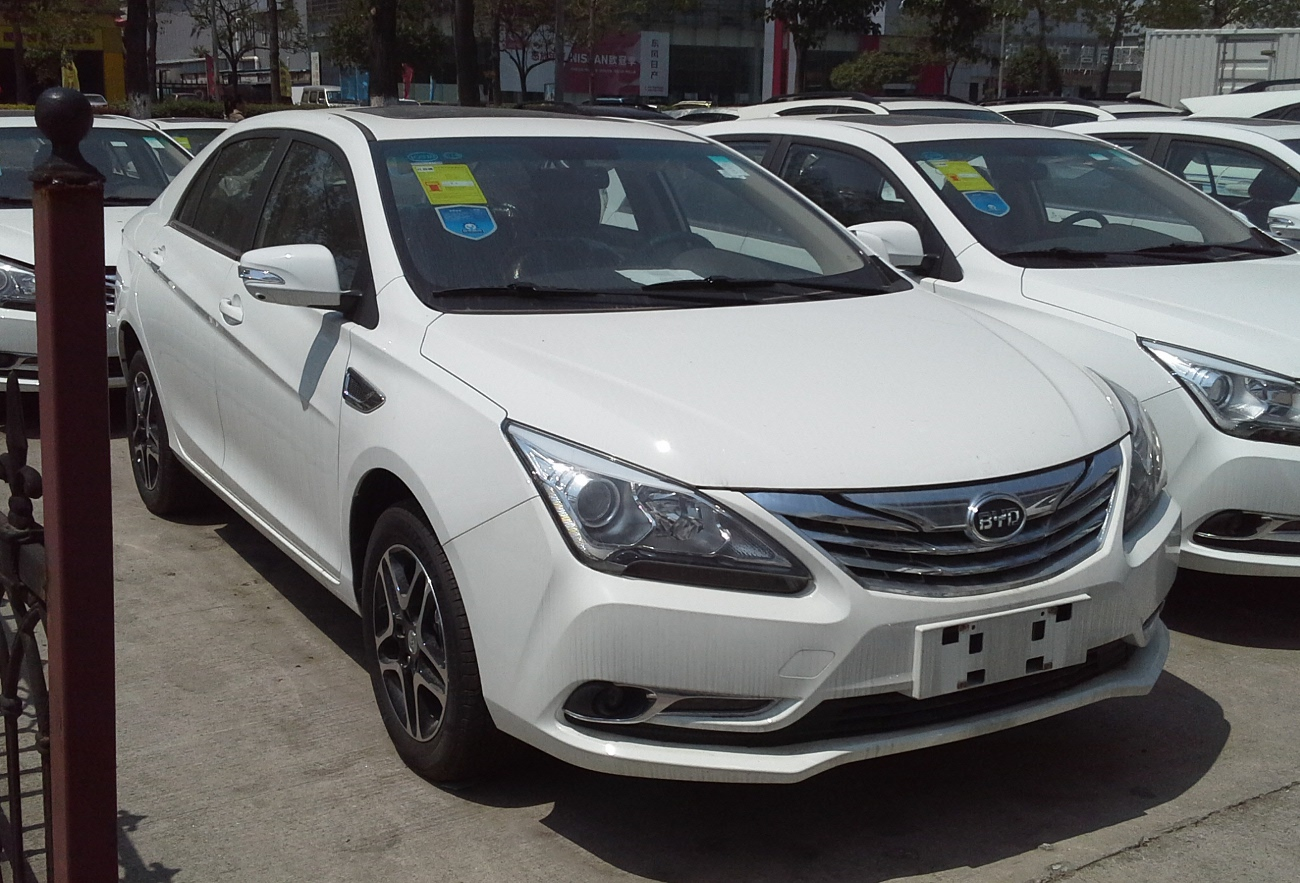
BYD G5s at a BYD dealer
