= Moskvitch G5 =

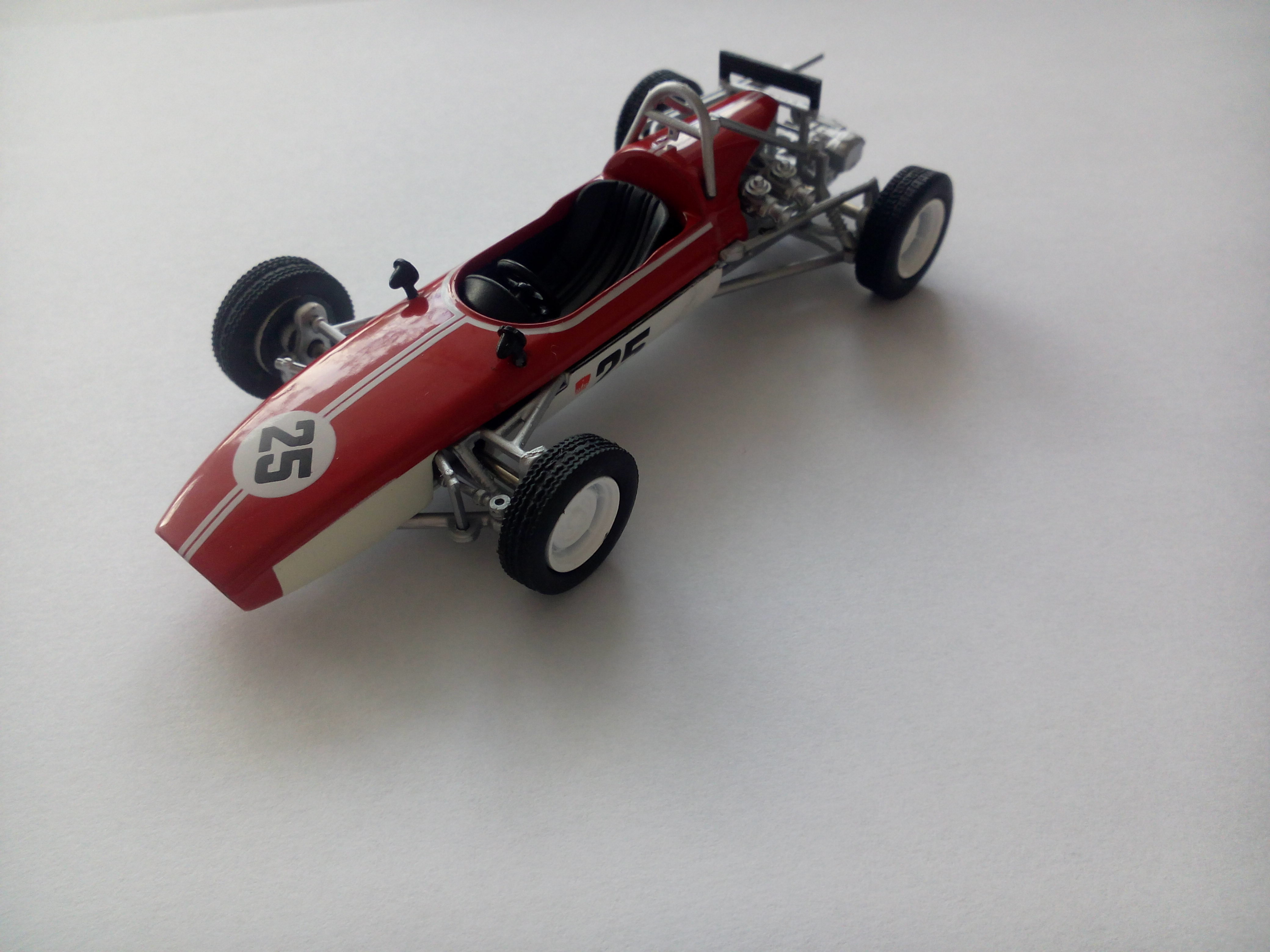
- Moskvitch G5M scale model

Overview
- Manufacturer: Moskvitch
- Production: 1968 - 1969
- Designer: I. Gladilin; M. Milstein

Body and chassis
- Class: Formula One car
- Body style: Open wheel

Powertrain
- Engine: 1.5L GD-1 DOHC V8 (prototype); 1.5L UZAM-412-based DOHC I4

Dimensions
- Curb weight: 580 kg (1,279 lb)

Chronology
- Predecessor: Moskvitch G4

The Moskvitch G5 was a Soviet Formula One car from Moskvitch released in 1968. It was connected with a Soviet program of international Formula One racing, but was used only in Soviet edition of Formula One. Despite popular belief, the G5 as such was not meant to race in international Formula One racing. The G5 was a successor of Moskvitch G4, and components of two G4M's were used to construct both G5 cars. Main difference was a new construction layout, with a new five-gear gearbox mounted at the rear, behind an engine and a rear axle. Also a rear suspension was new one. The G5 was also the first Russian car with disk brakes on all wheels. The car debuted in Soviet Formula One racing in September 1968. The engine was an uprated 1478 cc inline-4 engine from the Moskvitch 412, taken from the G4M and developing first 92 hp (70 kW). During 1969 season the engine was replaced with Moskvitch 412-2V, fitted with a new DOHC head and two twin Weber 40DCO carburetors. This engine produced 100 hp (75 kW) at 5800 rpm. In 1970 the engine was modified to develop 112 hp (80 kW). Displacement was increased to 1840 cc in 1972 (now producing 124 hp (92 kW). A fiberglass body was also added in 1974, replacing an aluminium body, and the cars were redesignated as G5M (this designation is sometimes used already for 1972 version as well). The G5M was raced until 1976. The two cars were given in 1983 to Moskvitch factory museum.

In 1963 there started a program, led by Igor Gladilin and Lev Shugurov to design an engine for a true international Formula One car. The effect was the GD-1, an eight-cylinder 1500 cc DOHC engine which was to give 200 hp (150 kW) at 10,500 rpm. Moskvitch factory had no suitable test stand for high-rev engines, but already during tests the engine produced 162 hp (121 kW) at 6000 rpm. The engine was fitted with four dual Weber 280DKB carburettors and the total weight was 148 kg (326 lb). The fibreglass body was designed using a wind tunnel. The engine and a five-gear gearbox were built in 1965 and a new G5 chassis was modified for test purpose, although it was not meant to be a final car. However, in 1965 a government funding was cut, and Moskvitch factory alone could not afford a program, so it was abandoned in 1967. Also, by that year more powerful 3000 cc engines were introduced to Formula One. Only the new gearbox, with four upper gears synchronised, was adapted for G5 cars.
