= Gonow Aoosed GX5 =

Chinese crossover SUV

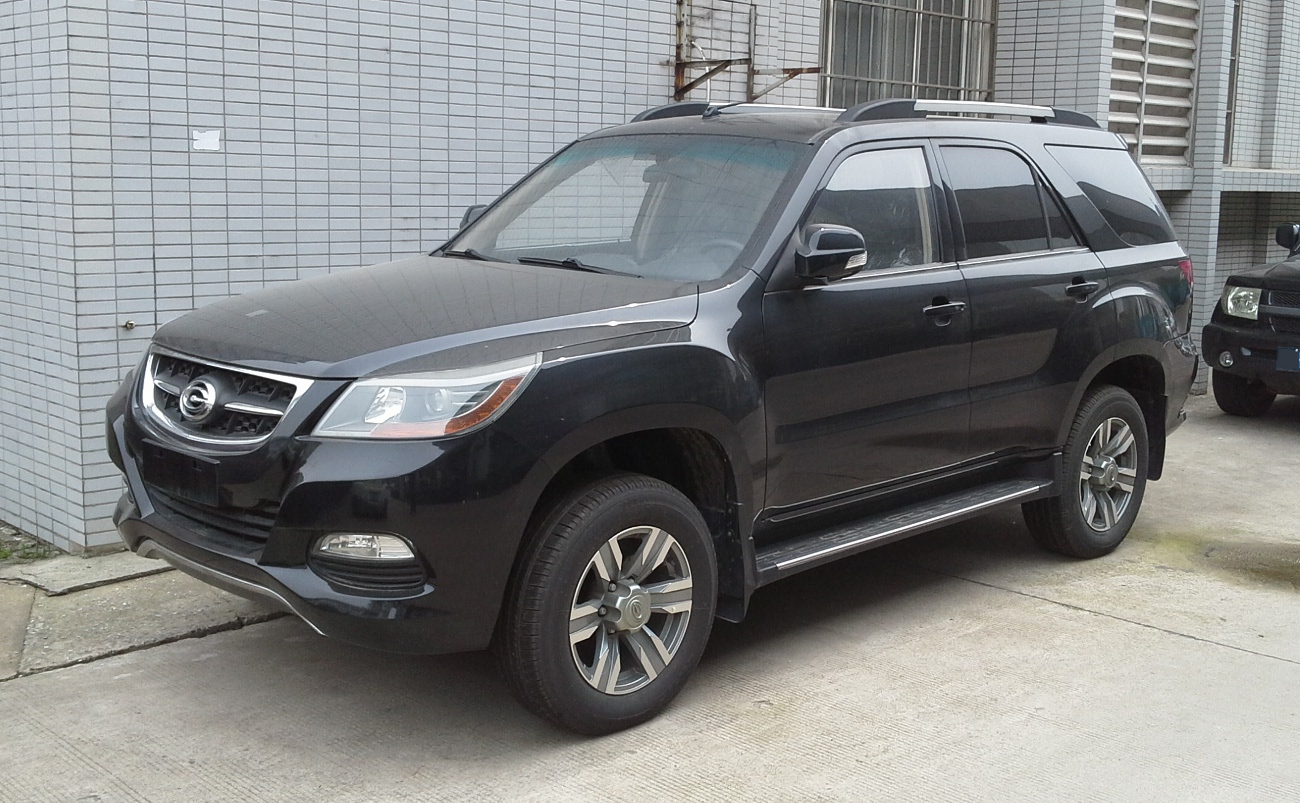

Overview
- Also called: Gonow Aoosed G5; Gonow GX5; Gonow G5
- Production: 2010–2012 (G5); 2012–2014 (GX5)

Body and chassis
- Layout: Front engine, four-wheel drive
- Related: Gonow GX6

Powertrain
- Engine: Mitsubishi 4G69S4N 2.4L inline-4 Mitsubishi 4G63S4M 2.0L inline-4 GA4D25TCI Turbo Diesel 2.5L inline-4
- Transmission: 5-speed manual transmission 5-speed automatic transmission

Dimensions
- Wheelbase: 2,745 mm (108.1 in)
- Length: 4,640 mm (182.7 in)
- Width: 1,815 mm (71.5 in)
- Height: 1,830 mm (72.0 in)

The Gonow Aoosed GX5 (Chinese: 奥轩 GX5) is a mid-size crossover SUV (mid-size SUV produced from 2010 to 2014 by the Chinese manufacturer Guangzhou Automobile under the Gonow brand.

Originally called the Gonow Aoosed G5, Gonow's Aoosed SUV made its debut on the 2010 Guangzhou Auto Show on December 21, 2010. A facelift and major update in 2012 changed the name to Aoosed GX5 to be sold alongside the more upmarket GX6.

== Overview ==
The Aoosed G5 is powered by a Mitsubishi-sourced 2.4 liter engine with a torque as high as 196Nm. The Gonow Aoosed G5 adopts a Hyundai 5-speed automatic gearbox, and can shift between 4WD mode and 2WD mode depending on the terrain. The price of the Aoosed G5 ranges from 86,800 yuan to 148,800 yuan.

The updated Aoosed GX5 features slightly restyled front and rear bumpers and a new optional 2.0 liter engine and a 2.5 liter diesel engine. The price of the Aoosed GX5 ranges from 109,800 yuan to 151,800 yuan.

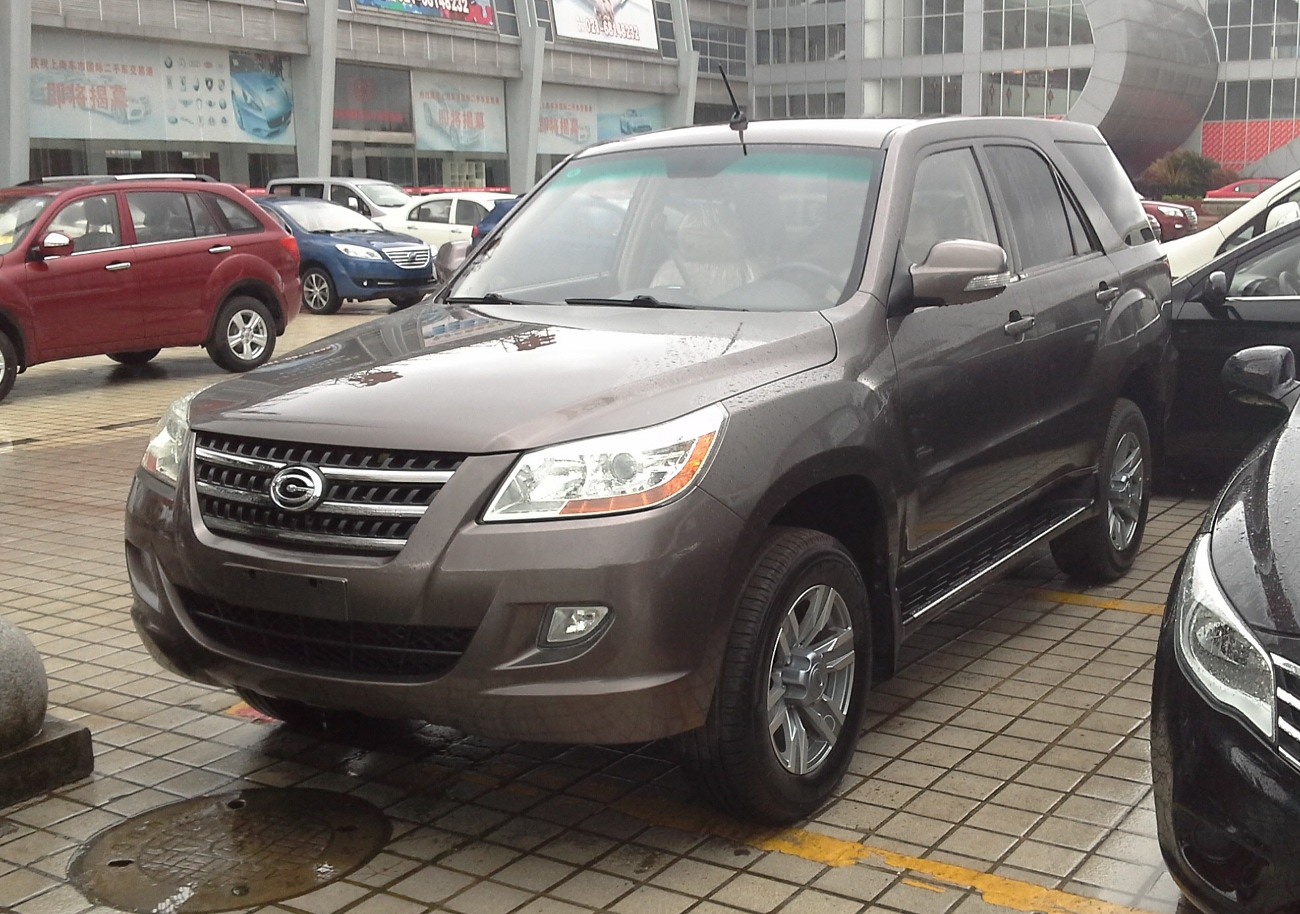
Gonow Aoosed G5

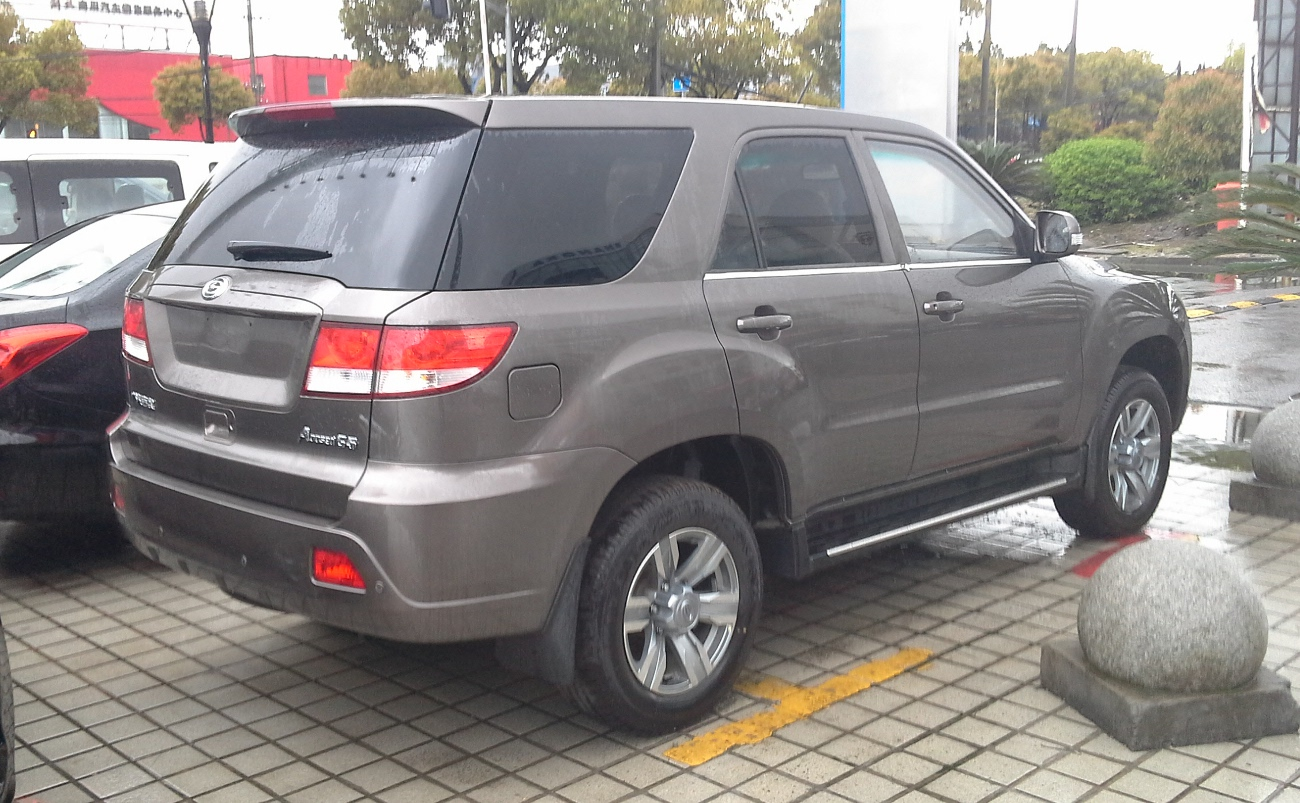
Gonow Aoosed G5

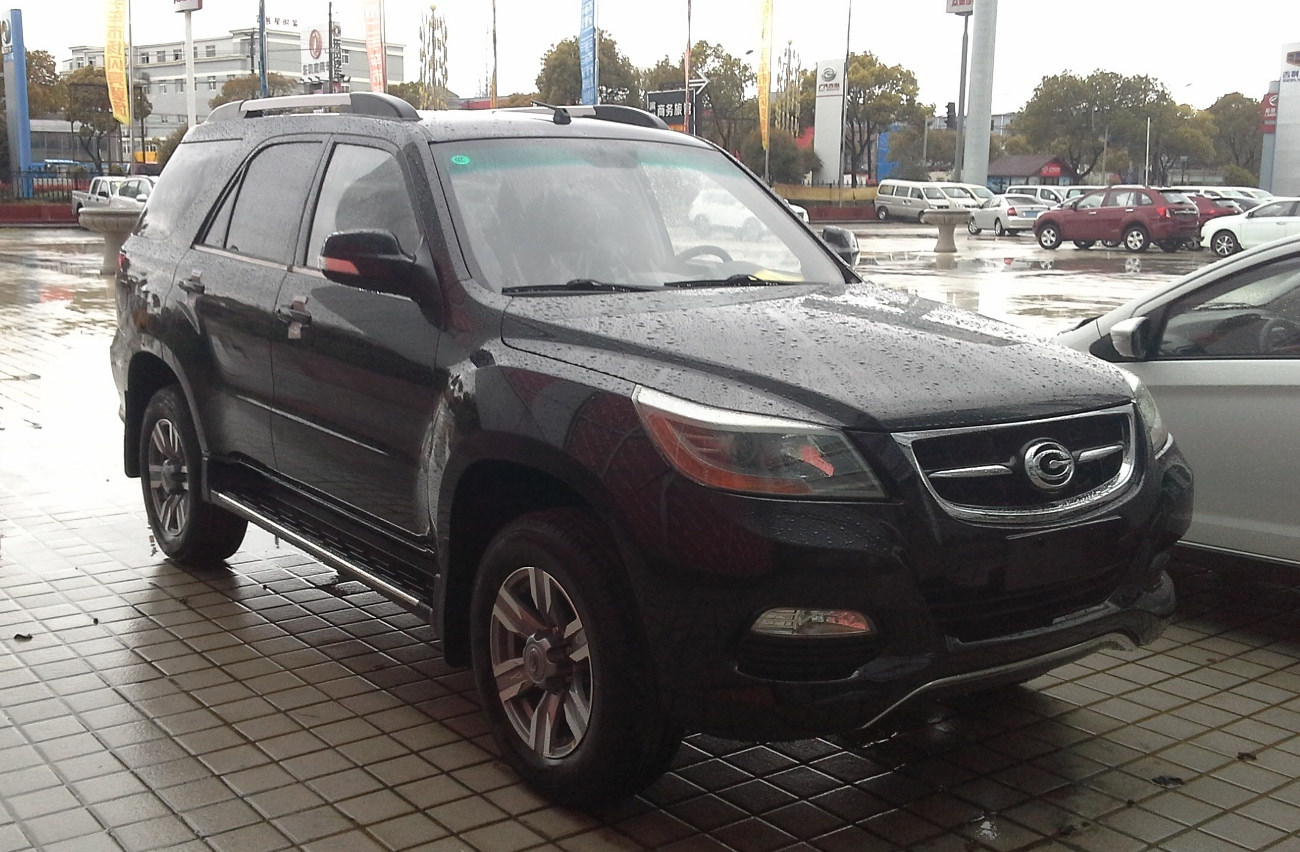
Gonow Aoosed GX5

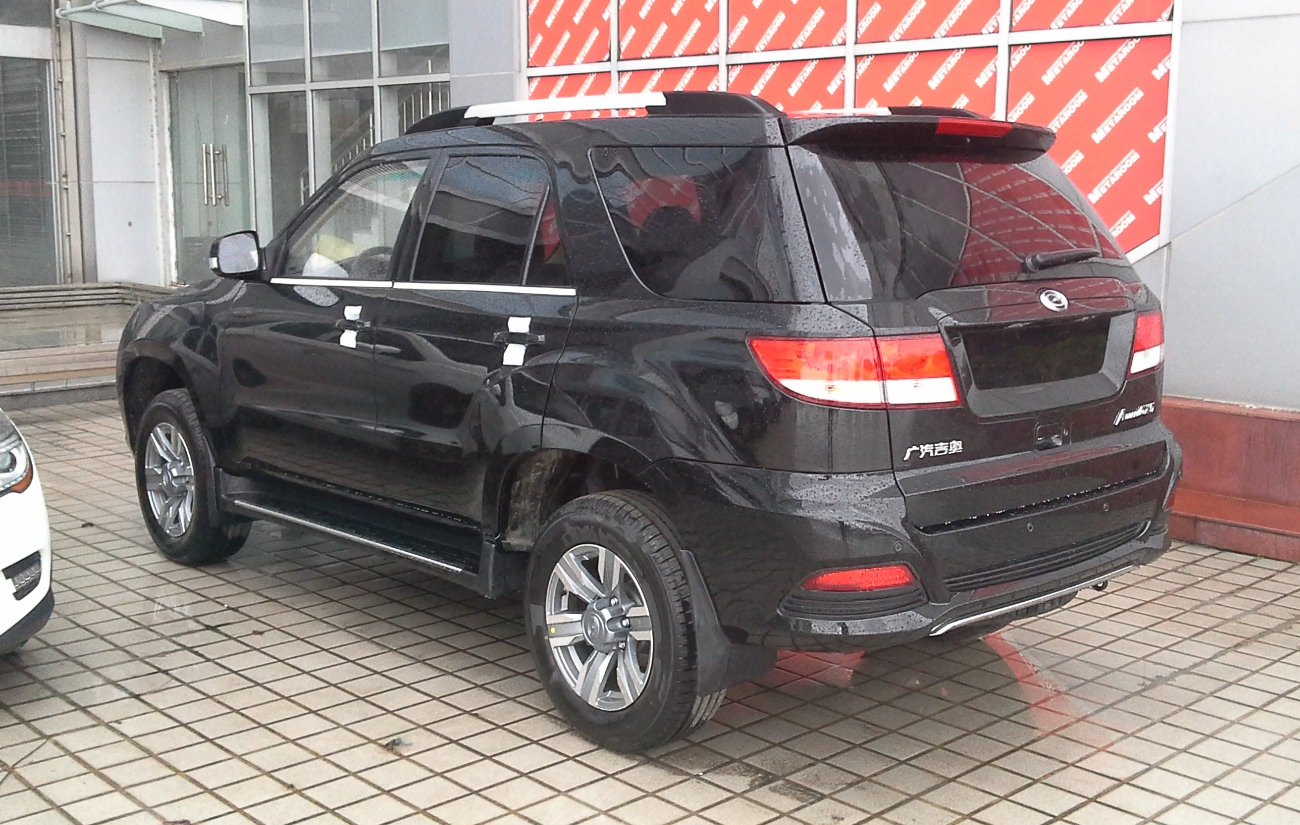
Gonow Aoosed GX5

== See also ==
- List of GAC vehicles
