= Gemma (given name) =

Gemma is an Italian female name, of Latin origin, meaning "bud" or "precious stone". The name has been amongst the most popular in England and Scotland during the 1980s.

== People with the given name ==
=== Female ===
- Gemma Acheampong (born 1993), Gahanaian-American athlete
- Gemma Arró (born 1980), Catalan ski mountaineer
- Gemma Arterton (born 1986), English actress
- Gemma Atkinson (born 1984), English actress and model
- Gemma Beadsworth (born 1987), Australian water polo player
- Gemma Bissix (born 1983), English actress
- Gemma Bond (born 1982), English ballet dancer
- Gemma Bonner (born 1991), English professional footballer
- Gemma Booth (born 1974), English photographer
- Gemma Cairney (born 1985), English television and radio presenter
- Gemma Calvert, British neuroscientist
- Gemma Chan (born 1982), British actress
- Gemma Collins (born 1981), English media personality and businesswoman
- Gemma Correll (born 1984), British cartoonist and illustrator
- Gemma Cowling, Australian model
- Gemma Craven (born 1950), Irish actress
- Gemma Cruz-Araneta (born 1943), Filipino writer and director
- Gemma Cuervo (1934–2026), Spanish actress
- Gemma Davies (born 1991), English football manager
- Gemma D'Arcy (1983–1990), British leukemia sufferer
- Gemma Donati (1265–after 1333), wife of the Italian poet Dante Alighieri
- Gemma Doyle (politician) (born 1981), British politician
- Gemma Dryburgh (born 1993), Scottish professional golfer
- Gemma Dudley (born 1990), New Zealand female track cyclist
- Gemma Etheridge (born 1986), Australian rugby union player
- Gemma Evans (journalist), British television presenter
- Gemma Fay (born 1981), Scottish footballer
- Gemma Figtree, Australian cardiologist and professor of medicine
- Gemma Flynn (born 1990), New Zealand field hockey player
- Gemma Frizelle (born 1998), British rhythmic gymnast
- Gemma Font (born 1999), Spanish professional footballer
- Gemma Fox, English singer-songwriter
- Gemma Galdón-Clavell (born 1976), Spanish technology policy analyst
- Gemma Galgani or Saint Gemma of Lucca (1878–1903), Italian mystic with signs of stigmata, venerated in the Roman Catholic Church as a saint
- Gemma Galli (born 1996), Italian synchronised swimmer
- Gemma Garrett (born 1981), Northern Irish beauty pageant contestant
- Gemma Geis (born 1979), Catalan politician
- Gemma Gibbons (born 1987), British judoka
- Gemma Gili (born 1994), Spanish footballer
- Gemma Grainger (born 1982), English football manager
- Gemma Griffiths, Zimbabwean singer-songwriter
- Gemma Hayes (born 1977), Irish singer-songwriter
- Gemma Hayter (1982–2010), English murder victim
- Gemma Hickey (born 1976), Canadian LGBTQ+ rights activist, author, and political candidate
- Gemma Houghton (born 1993), Australian rules footballer
- Gemma Howell (born 1990), British judoka
- Gemma Hunt (born 1982), English children's TV presenter
- Gemma Hussey (1938–2024), Irish politician
- Gemma Jackson (born 1951), British production designer
- Gemma Jones (born 1942), English actress
- Gemma Lagioia (born 2001), Australian rules footballer
- Gemma Lavender (born 1986), British astronomer, author, and journalist
- Gemma Lienas (born 1951), Spanish writer, feminist activist, and politician
- Gemma Magría (born 1981), Spanish taekwondo champion
- Gemma McCluskie (1983–2012), English actress
- Gemma Mengual (born 1977), Catalan synchronised swimmer
- Gemma Narisma (1972–2021), Filipina climate researcher
- Gemma Nelson (born 1984), English mixed media painter
- Gemma New (born 1986), New Zealand orchestral conductor
- Gemma Newman, British medical doctor and nutritionist
- Gemma Nierga (born 1965), Spanish journalist
- Gemma Oaten (born 1984), English actress
- Gemma O'Doherty (born 1968), Irish far-right activist and conspiracy theorist
- Gemma Peacocke, composer from New Zealand
- Ġemma Portelli (1932–2008), Maltese actress
- Gemma Pranita (born 1985), Australian actress
- Gemma Ray, British songwriter and film composer
- Gemma Richardson (born 2001), English professional boxer
- Gemma Royo (born 1975), Spanish rhythmic gymnast
- Gemma Sanderson (born 1983), Australian model and the winner of Australia's Next Top Model, Cycle 1
- Gemma Sena Chiesa (1929–2024), Italian archaeologist
- Gemma Smith (born 1978), Australian painter and sculptor
- Gemma Spofforth (born 1987), English competitive swimmer
- Gemma Taccogna (1923–2007) Italian-born American and Mexican visual artist
- Gemma Tattersall (born 1985), British Olympic rider
- Gemma Triay (born 1992), Spanish professional padel player from Menorca
- Gemma Tumelty (born 1980), British political and student activist
- Gemma Ward (born 1987), Australian model
- Gemma Whelan (born 1981), English actress and comedian
- Gemma Wollenschlaeger (born 2003), American Paralympic rower

=== Male ===
- Gemma Frisius (1508–1555), Frisian mathematician, cartographer and instrument maker

=== People with the nickname ===
- Gemma Jones (born 1942), English actress

== Fictional characters ==
- Gemma, in the first series of the Sky One supernatural TV series Hex
- Gemma, in the children's Hospital Radio series The Space Gypsy Adventures
- Gemma, in the 2023 science-fiction horror film M3GAN
- Gemma Ball, in the television series Shameless
- Gemma Bovery, in the film Gemma Bovery
- Gemma Doyle, heroine of Libba Bray's novels A Great and Terrible Beauty, Rebel Angels, and The Sweet Far Thing; see List of Gemma Doyle Trilogy characters
- Gemma Foster, the main character in the British series Doctor Foster
- Gemma Larson, in the ABC series Grey's Anatomy
- Gemma Teller Morrow, in the FX TV series Sons of Anarchy
- Gemma Nerrick, in the Netflix mockumentaries Death to 2020 and Death to 2021
- Gemma Palmer, in Solo, a British sitcom
- Gemma Reeves, in the Australian soap opera Neighbours
- Gemma Scout, a character from the Apple TV+ series Severance
- Gemma T., in the Stephen King novel Doctor Sleep
- Gemma Warren, heroine of the 1897 novel The Gadfly
- Gemma Winter, in the British soap opera Coronation Street
- Gemma Beauregard, in the Jae Harlow webcomic Legends of Vithra
- DSU Gemma Garland, the antagonist of British thriller The Capture

== See also ==
- Emma (given name)
- Gema (given name)
- Gemma (surname)
- Jemma (given name)
