= Disina =

- Location in Nigeria
- Coordinates: 11°29′N 9°55′E
- Country: Nigeria
- State: Bauchi State

Disina is a town in Shira Local Government Area, Bauchi State, northeastern Nigeria, located 35 kilometres southwest of Azare. It lies along the Bunga River, between the towns of Jemma and Foggo. The estimated population as of 2007 is 18,792.
