= Gemme =

Gemme may refer to:

- Gemme, an album by French musician Nolwenn Leroy and "Gemme", a song on the album

== See also ==
- Gemma (disambiguation)
- Sainte-Gemme (disambiguation)
