= Jemma =

Jemma may refer to:

- Jemma (given name), a given name
- Jemma, Bauchi, a town in Bauchi State, Nigeria
- Dorothée Jemma, a French voice actress specializing in dubbing
- Ottavio Jemma, an Italian screenwriter
- Rocco Jemma, an Italian pediatrician

== See also ==
- Jema'a, a local government area in Kaduna State, Nigeria
- Gemma (disambiguation)
