= Gema (given name) =

Gema is a given name. Notable people with the name include:

- Gema Alava (born 1973), Spanish artist
- Gema Climent (born 1971), Spanish psychologist
- Gema Hassen-Bey (born 1967), Spanish wheelchair fencer
- Gema León (born 1991), Mexican volleyball player
- Gema Martínez López (born 1950), Mexican politician
- Gema Pascual (born 1979), Spanish cyclist
- Gema Peris (born 1983), Spanish weightlifter
- Gema Ramkeesoon (born 1999), Trinidadian and Tobagonian social worker and women's rights activist
- Gema Sevillano (1972–2019), Spanish Paralympic swimmer and paratriathlete
- Gema Simon (born 1990), Australian soccer player
- Gema Zamprogna (born 1976), Canadian actress
- Gema Zúñiga (born 1993), Nicaraguan footballer

== See also ==
- Gemma (given name)
