= Cowling (disambiguation) =

A cowling is an engine cover.

Cowling or Cowlinge may also refer to:

== Places in the United Kingdom ==
- Cowling, Craven, a village, parish and geographical area in the district of Craven, North Yorkshire
- Cowling, Hambleton, a village in the parish of Burrill with Cowling, North Yorkshire
- Cowlinge, a village in Suffolk

== People ==
- Belinda Cowling, French medical researcher
- Bruce Cowling (1919–1986), American actor
- Gemma Cowling, Australian model
- Maurice Cowling (1926–2005), British historian
- Robin Cowling (1944–2026), British rugby union player
- Thomas Cowling (1906–1990), British astronomer

== See also ==
- Carleton College Cowling Arboretum
- Cowl (disambiguation)
