= Gemma =

Gemma or GEMMA may refer to:

== People and fictional characters ==
- Gemma (given name), including a list of people and fictional characters with the name
- Gemma (surname), including a list of people with the name

== Science and technology ==
=== Biology ===
- Gemma (botany), an asexual reproductive structure in plants and fungi
- Gemma, a monotypic genus of the Veneridae family of saltwater clams
  - Gemma gemma, the type species
- Gemma, a bud-like appendage in ants of the Diacamma genus

=== Other sciences and technology ===
- Walter Gemma, a radial aero engine manufactured by Walter Aircraft Engines in the early 1930
- Gas phase electrophoretic molecular mobility analysis (GEMMA), a chemical analysis technique
- Gemma (language model), a family of open-weight models developed by Google
- Alpha Coronae Borealis or Gemma, a binary star
- Gemma, an Adafruit Industries Arduino-compatible microcontroller

== Ships ==
- Italian submarine Gemma
- MV Gemma, a Dutch coastal tanker lost in 1951
- SS Gemma, a German cargo ship in service during 1928

== Other uses ==
- Gemma (organisation), an organization and magazine for disabled lesbians in England

== See also ==
- Jemma (disambiguation)
