= Zadawa =

- Location in Nigeria
- Coordinates: 11°27′0″N 10°22′05″E
- Country: Nigeria
- State: Bauchi State
- LGA: Misau

Zadawa is a town in Bauchi State, Nigeria.

== Geography ==
Zadawa is located 120 km east of Dutse, 30 km southeast of Azare, 35 km south of Madara, and 40 km east of Faggo. The population of Zadawa is 7,772.
