= David Bacon (photojournalist) =

American photojournalist, author, political activist, and union organizer

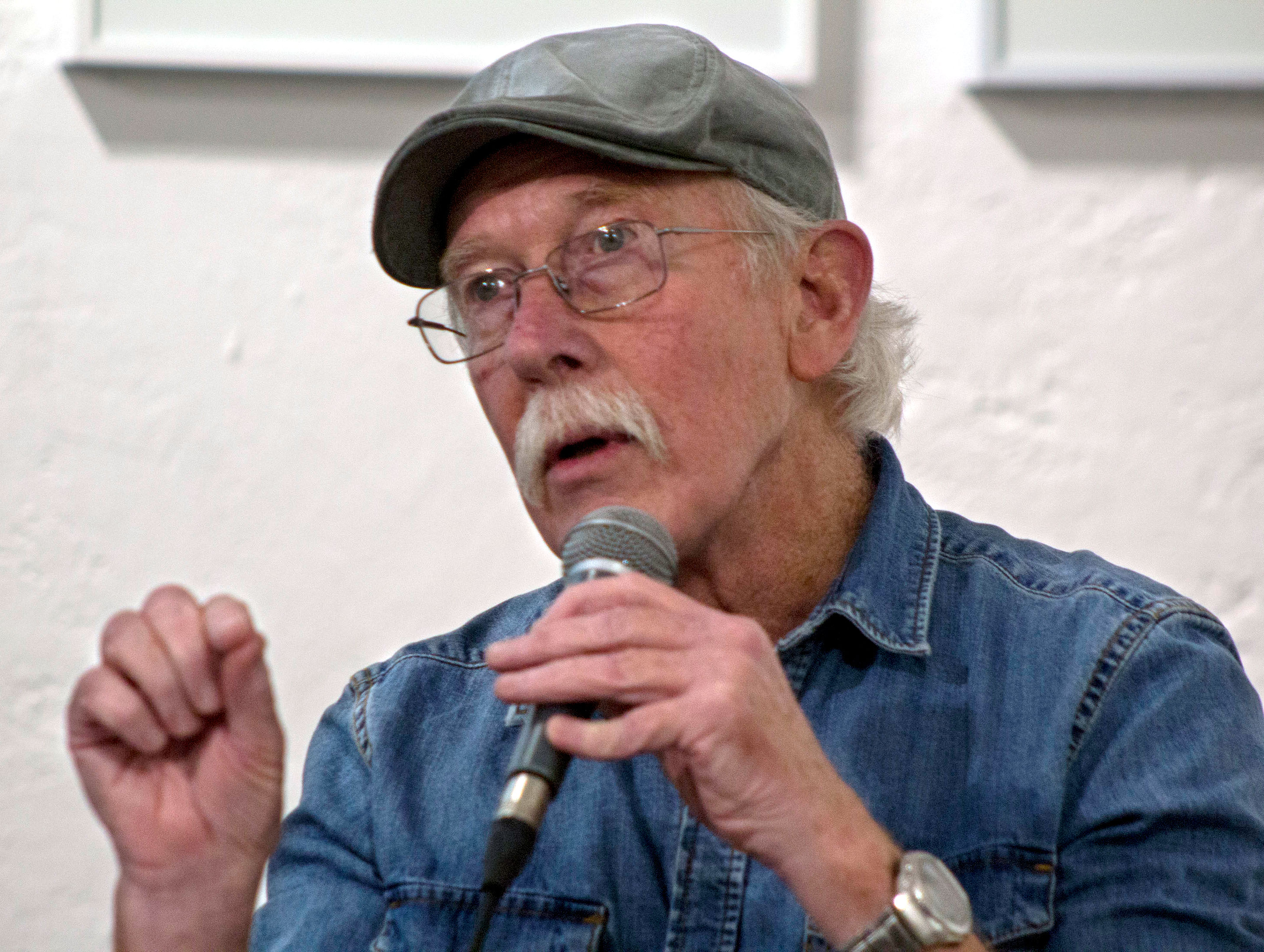
- Bacon at the Museum of the Photographic Archive in Mexico City, January 2018
- Born: 1948 (age 77–78)
- Occupations: Photojournalist, author, political activist, union organizer
- Website: dbacon.igc.org

Talk Nation Radio - 2010-01-01 David Bacon on "How Globalization Creates Immigration and Criminalizes Immigrants".

David Bacon (born 1948) is an American photojournalist, author, political activist, and union organizer who has focused on labor issues, particularly those related to immigrant labor. He has written several books and numerous articles on the subject.

Bacon's parents were strong supporter of unionism and his early interest in labor issues began with union organizing activities. He was involved in organizing efforts for the United Farm Workers, the United Electrical Workers, the International Ladies' Garment Workers' Union, the Molders' Union and others.

== Books ==
- The children of NAFTA : labor wars on the U.S./Mexico border 2003

(translated by Gemma Galdon as Hijos del libre comercio) 2005

- Communities without borders : images and voices from the world of migration 2006
- Illegal people : how globalization creates migration and criminalizes immigrants 2008
- The right to stay home : how US policy drives Mexican migration 2013

(translated as El derecho a quedarse en casa cómo las politícas de Estados Unidos influyen en la migración mexicana) 2013

- In the Fields of the North / En los campos del norte (2017)
- More Than a Wall / Más que un muro (2022)

== Exhibitions and articles (partial list) ==
- Every worker is an organizer : Farm labor and the resurgence of the United Farm Workers. WorkingUSA.Volume 2, Issue 6, pages 67–76, March–April 1999. 1999
- David Bacon, Fotografien: IG Metall-Galerie Frankfurt am Main, [13. März bis 28. April 2000] 2000
- Christmas at Woodfin Suites: When Woodfin Suites fired its immigrant workers, was it obeying the law or dodging a living-wage ordinance? East Bay Express, 24 Jan 2007. 2007
- Immigration and the Culture of Solidarity in Globalization and Migration (AFSC). Pages 58–66. 2008
- Uprooted and Criminalized: The Impact of Free Markets on Migrants in Globalization and Migration (AFSC). Pages 69–91. 2008
- Displaced, unequal and criminalized : fighting for the rights of migrants in the United States 2011
- Living on the Streets of Oakland East Bay Express. August 6, 2014.
- ‘You Came Here to Suffer’ The Progressive. June 1, 2018
