= Cowl (disambiguation) =

A cowl is a garment worn by monks and nuns with solemn vows.

Cowl may also refer to:

== People ==
- Darry Cowl (1925–2006), French actor
- George Cowl (1878–1942), British film actor
- Jane Cowl (1883–1950), American stage actress and playwright

== Technology ==
- Cowl or cowling, a removable protective covering over all or part of an engine
- Cowl (chimney), a device fitted to a chimney pot to prevent wind blowing the smoke back down into the room beneath
- Cowl (oast), the revolving device found on oasts, maltings, and breweries
- Cowl unit, a body style for locomotives

== Arts, entertainment, media ==
- Cowl (novel), a science fiction novel
- C.O.W.L. (comics), an Image Comics comic book series in the Massive-Verse fictional universe

== Other uses ==
- Cowl (mask), a mask that covers the majority of the head
- Cowl neck, a type of neckline in fashion
- La Cagoule (The Cowl), a French political movement

== See also ==
- Cowling (disambiguation)
- Crimson Cowl, the name of some Marvel Comics characters
- Legend of the White Cowl, a Russian Orthodox Church story
