= Azare =

Place in Bauchi State, Nigeria

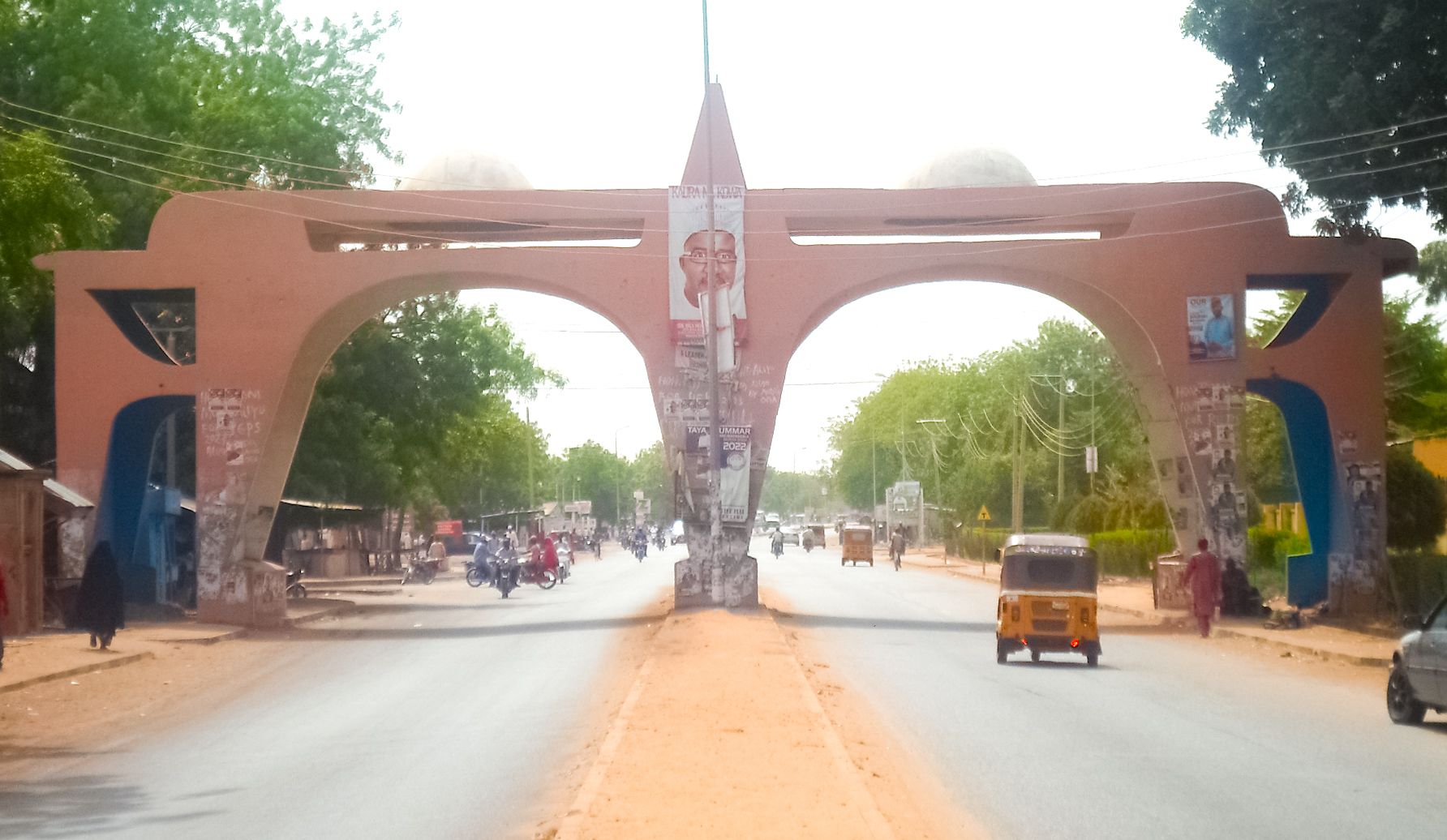
- Azare Town's Gate
- Nickname: Azland
- Location in Nigeria
- Coordinates: 11°40′27″N 10°11′28″E
- Country: Nigeria
- State: Bauchi State
- LGA: Katagum

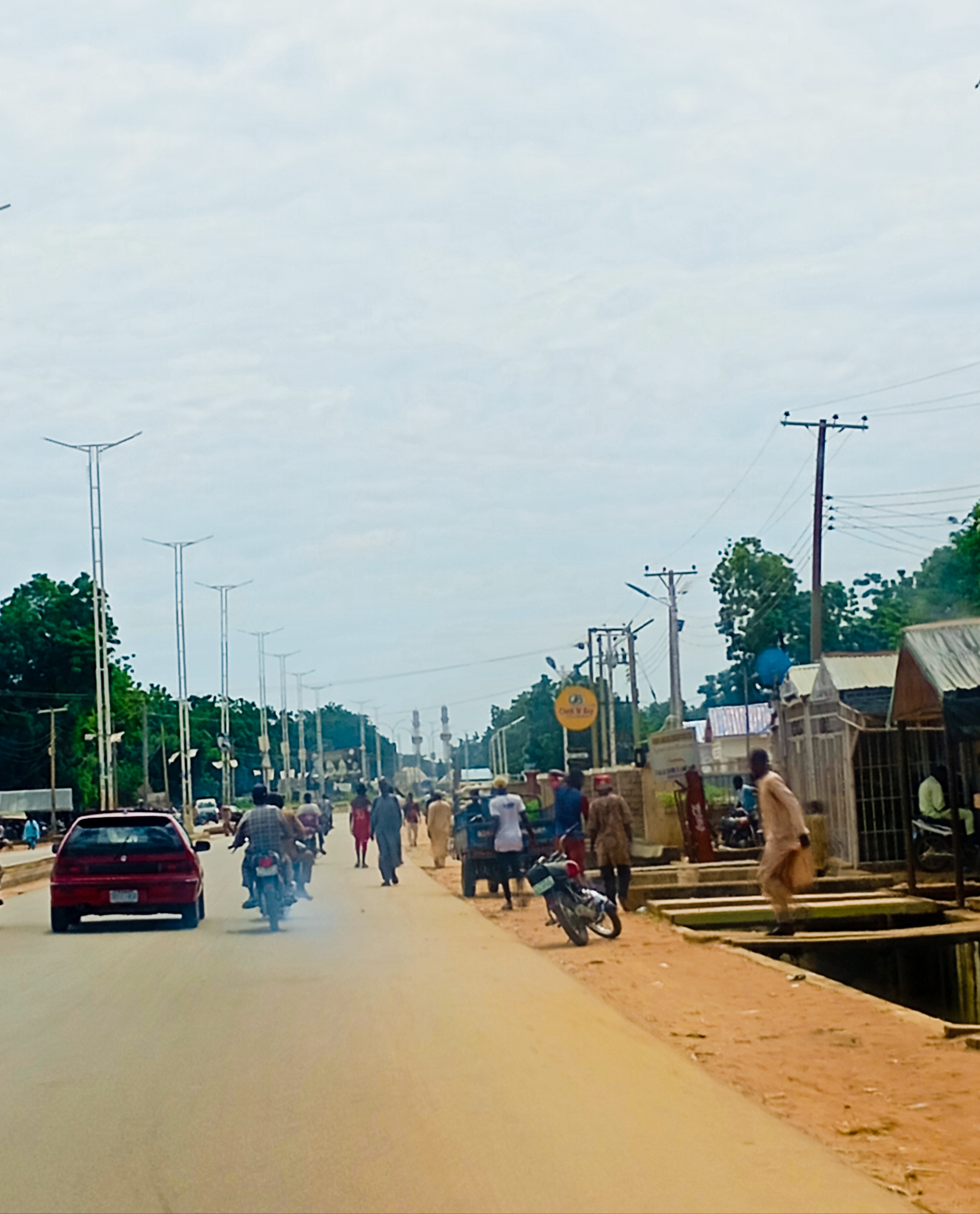
City of Azare

Azare is a city in Bauchi State, Nigeria. It was founded by Mallam Zaki, who was appointed by Shehu Usman Dan Fodio in early 1814. Azare is the headquarters of Katagum LGA in Bauchi State. It is bordered by Damban Local Government Area (LGA) and Potiskum (in Yobe State) to the east, by Misau LGA to the south, by Jama'are LGA to the west, and by Itas/Gadau LGA (in Bauchi State) to the north.

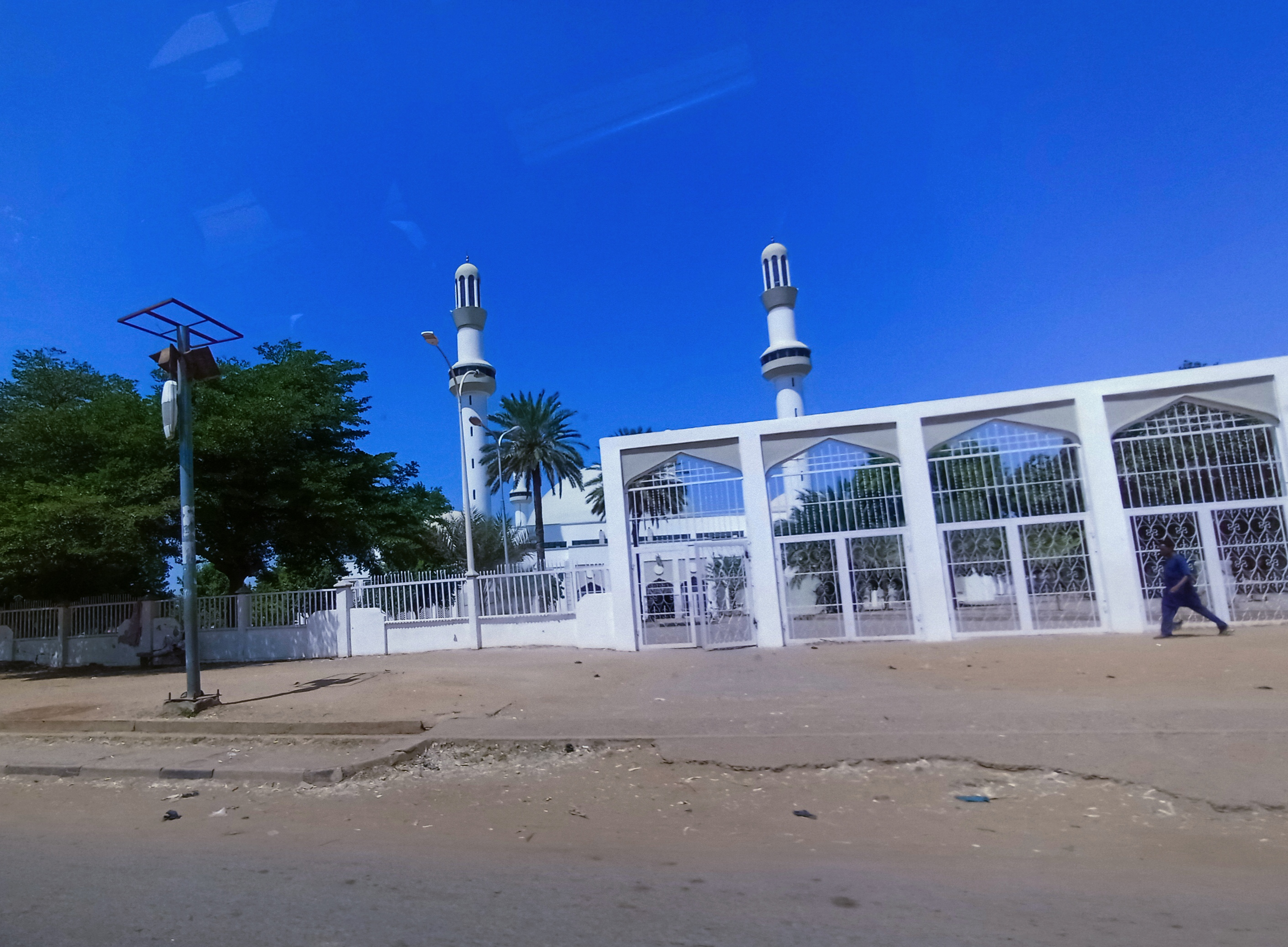
Mosque in Azare

== History ==
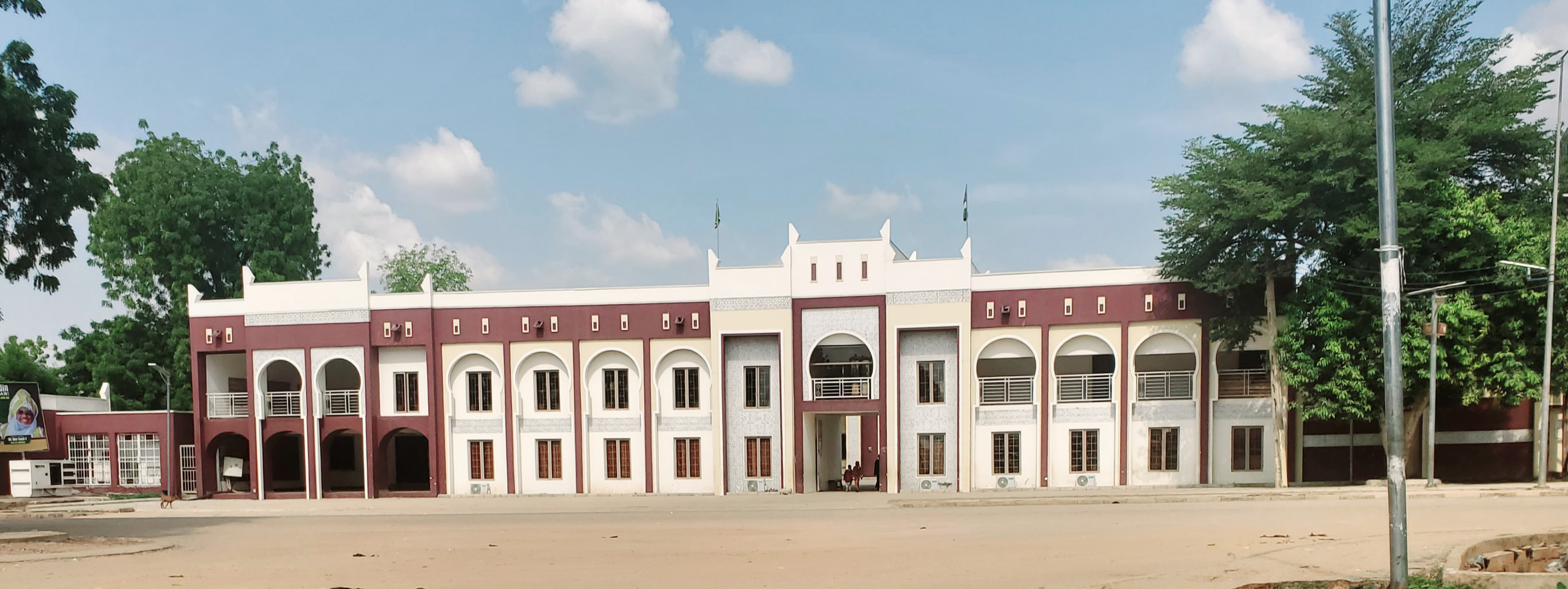
Azare Emir's Palace

Azare was founded in 1803 by Mallam Zaki, whose father first settled in Nafada, in the Gombe emirate, before later moving to Yayu, where Zaki was born. After the death of his father, Mallam went to Sheikh Usman Danfodio in Sokoto to take charge in his father's stead. In about 1809, Mallam settled at Tashena, a village about 90 kilometres away from the present Azare. He ruled from 1807 to 1914, and was succeeded by his brother, known as Sulaiman Adandaya, from 1814 to 1816. The third emir of Azare, Mallam Dankauwa, ruled from 1816 until his resignation in 1846. Not more than eight rulers ruled this region up to now.

== Climate ==
The dry season in Azare lasts from October to April, and the rainy season occurs between May and September, reaching its peak in August. Rainfall ranges between 1300mm per annum. The temperature is high throughout the emirate, with a mean daily 220c from April to May (1991). Lateral soils characterize the higher areas of the Azare Katagum plain, while more productive land by the flood plains provides fertility. The soil is favourable for the production and cultivation of cotton, especially in some parts of northern Azare, which is conducive for cotton production.

Azare was an agrarian society, with the majority of the populace depending on farming and animal husbandry, as dictated by its climate and soil condition, which favours the growing of cereal. Historically, agriculture has been highly successful in Azare. The rich Fadama around the region provides fertile land for cereals, root crops, tree crops such as caltrops, and a wider variety of vegetables, including millet (Gero), late millet (Maiwa), sorghum (Dawa), and groundnut and cotton, which are the chief export crops. The marketing board recorded 22,271 tons of groundnut. The climate and soil condition also support the production of bean (wake) and cassava (Rogo). Agriculture is the mainstay of the economy of Azare. This explains why the vast land, coupled with high soil quality, makes it possible for about 80-90% of its inhabitants to engage in food and cash crop farming. The major crops produced in the region include cotton, millet, late millet, groundnut, cassava, and guinea corn.

The vegetation pattern of the emirate can be classified into Sudan and Sahel savannah; the most prominent species commonly found are Shrub grass of Sabara Gabaruwa, Kargo (1991).

=== Air pollution ===
The amount of particulate matter, especially dust, in Azare is significantly increasing. Due to their small size and thickness, these particles can be dangerous to human health since they react chemically with the air.

=== Geology ===
Azare is underlain by undifferentiated rocks of the Basement complex, which have been subjected to weathering that produced a fairly deep regolith. The rocks are of Precambrian origin and consist of metamorphic and igneous rock types, common among which are the granite descriptions; migmatite, gneisses, and phyllites. The granite dominates the structures, hence, is referred to as the Older Granites. In most areas underlain by the Basement complex is a thin, discontinuous mantle of weathered rocks.

Previous geological studies of Azare are few. However, have described aspects of the geology of the Upper Benue Trough, and the hydrogeology of parts of Bauchi State. The stratigraphic succession of the Upper Benue Trough consists of folded Cretaceous sediments called the Bima Sandstones, unconformably overlying the Precambrian to Paleozoic Basement. This is succeeded by the Cretaceous Gombe sandstones, which pass upwards into the Tertiary sands of the Kerri Kerri Formation. The sequence is terminated by the Quaternary Chad Formation.

== Culture, ethnic groups, and religion ==
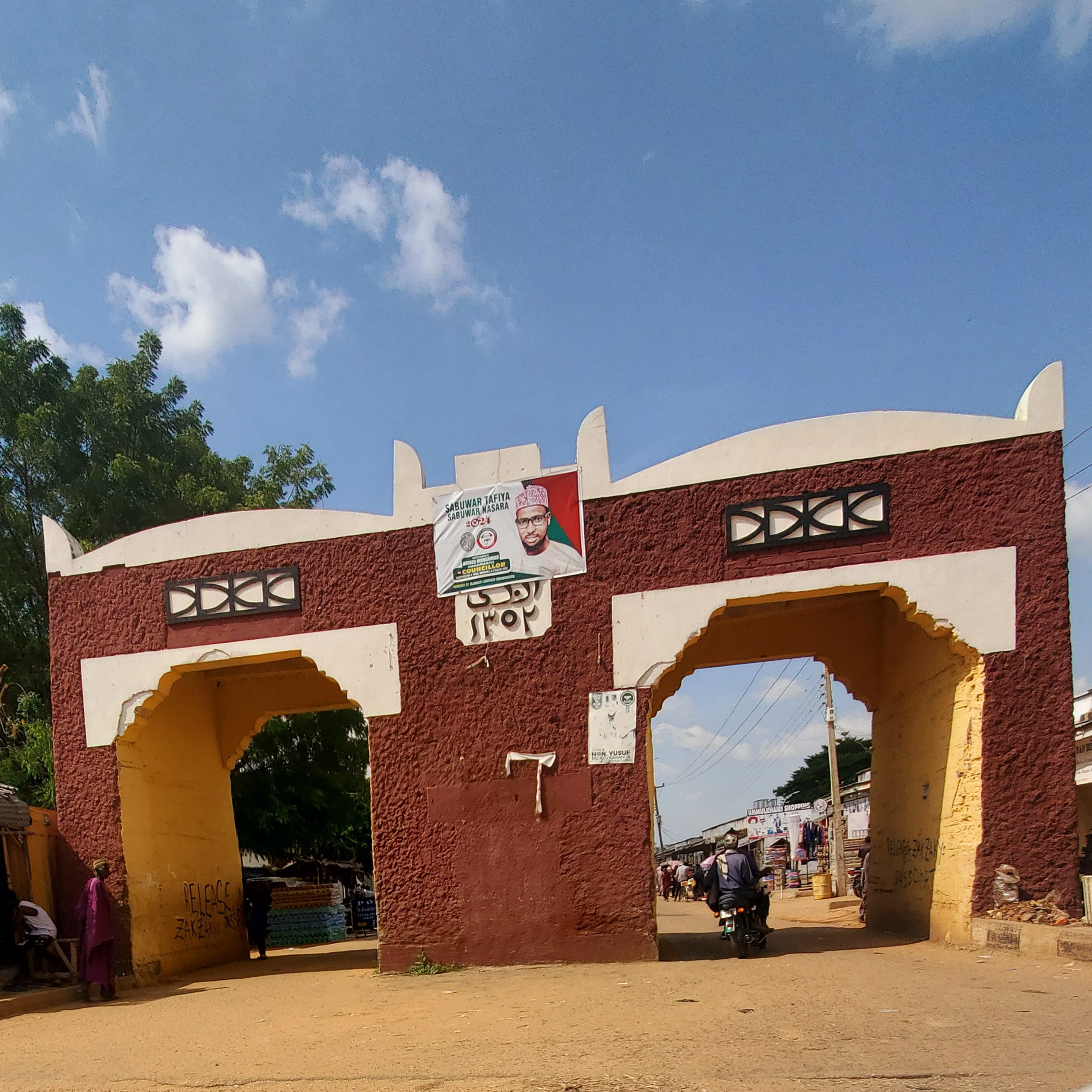
Azare Emir's Palace Gate

The culture of the people is mainly influenced by Islam respect. The marriage customs of the people are according to Islamic procedures, such as the marriage itself and mode of dressings. Although, there are some cultures that are prohibited by Islam, like tashe and Kidan Gwauro, which are mainly practised by small children.

Azare is a pluralistic region made up of diverse ethnic and religious groups. There are two ethnic groups in Azare: Fulani and kanuri. Hausa language is widely spoken in Azare. Other immigrants who have different varieties of occupation infiltrated the emirate in Nigeria to pursue various trades and commerce in Katagum. Emirate visitors are well received and were given proper treatment by the 19th century Katagum.

The two main religions in Azare are Islam (approximately 99%) and Christianity (approximately 1%).

There are many mosques and Arabic schools (Makarantun Allo), as well as various Islamic sects, such as Tijjaniyyah, Qadiriyyah, Shi'ah, and Jama'atul Izalatul Bida wa iqamatus sunnah, which were introduced as far back as the 19th century. However, an influx of immigrants has led to the introduction and propagation of Christianity. This resulted from the British colonial missionaries, and churches have sprung up in most parts of the districts of the emirate.

== Economy ==
=== Hotels ===
Azare has several hotels, including Oricon Suites, Katagum Hotel, Collinvest Guest Inn, Mansuldah Guest Inn, Muk Hotel, Jamil Hotel Azare, and Royal Guest Inn.

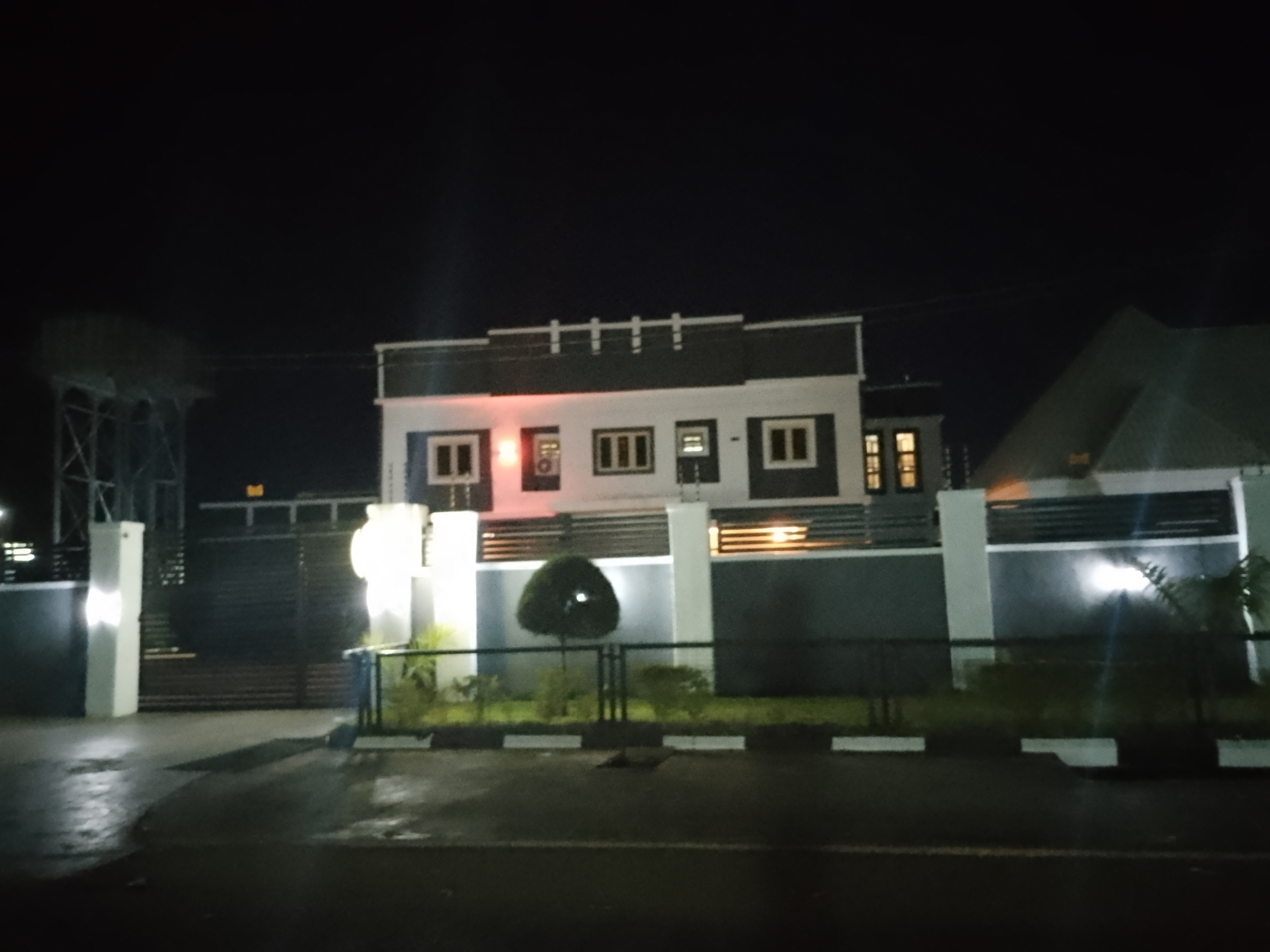
Oricon Suites.

=== Markets ===
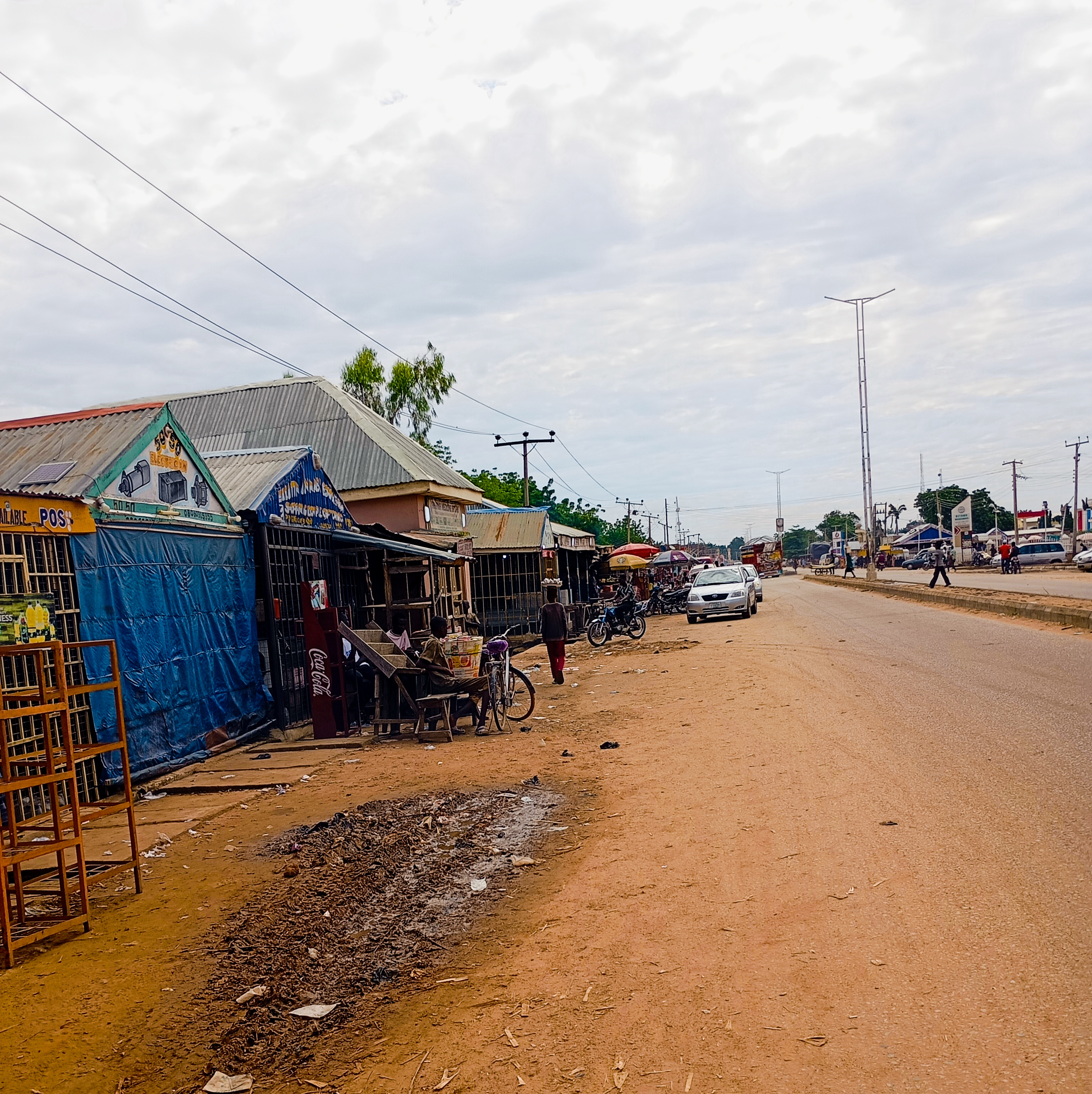
Azare Market

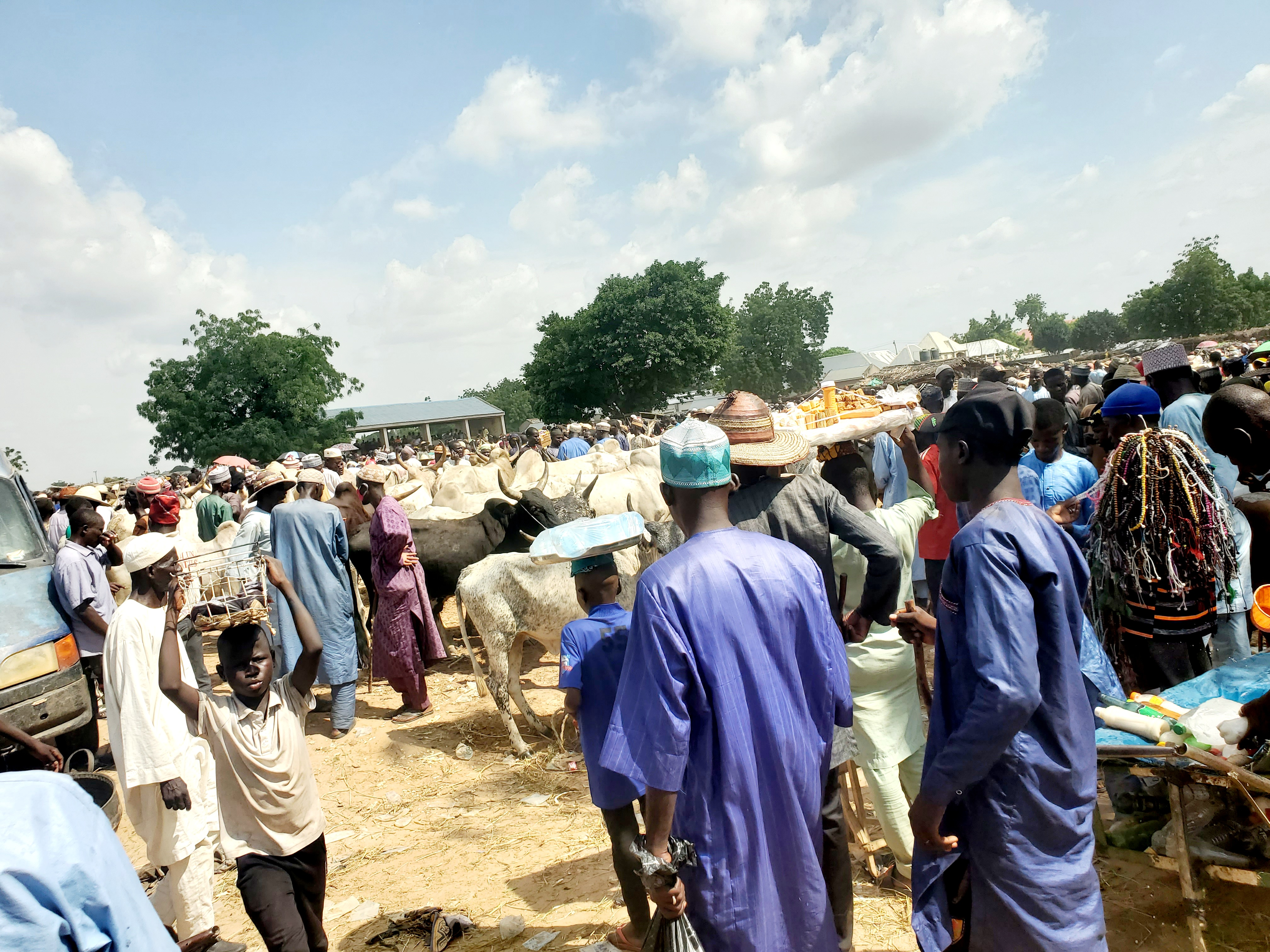
Azare Cattle market

There are two markets in Azare: Old Market Azare and New Market Azare.

=== Hospitals ===
- Federal Medical Center Azare (FMC)
- General Hospital Azare
- Extreme Hospital
- Royal Hotel Azare
- Azare Urban Maternity
- Mastango Maternity Azare
- Nasarawa a PHC
- Collage Clinic
- Queen Amina Medical Integration
- Ardo Standard Medical Center Azare
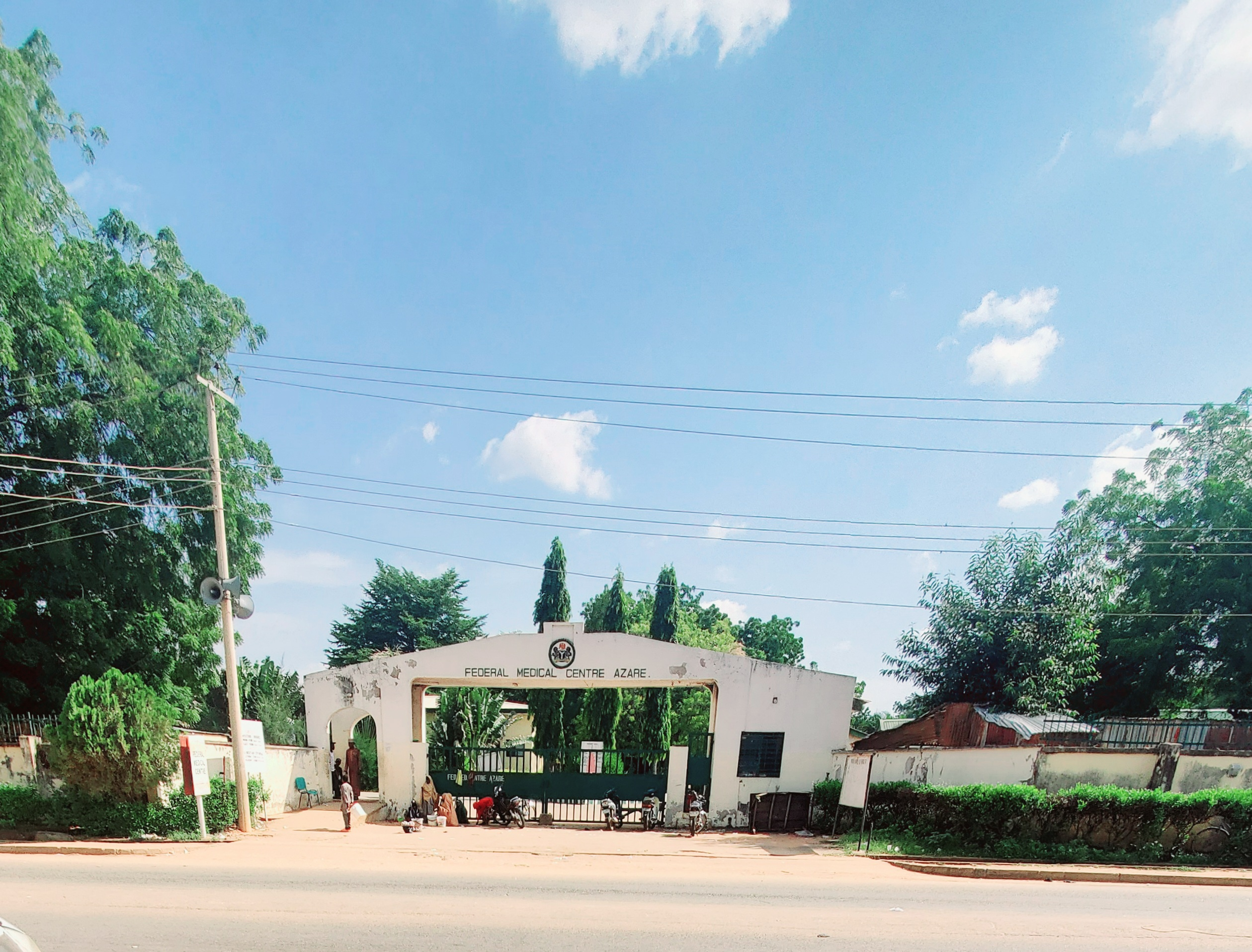
- Federal Medical Center Azare
  Azare Vitnery Hospital

== Geography ==
Azare is located at 11°40′27″N 10°11′28″E, at an elevation of 436 metres.

It is the largest of several nearby towns in the region, including Jama'are, Misau, Bulkachuwa, Disina, Faggo, Zadawa, Madachi, and Madara. Azare is home to the Federal Medical Centre, Azare, the Federal Government College Azare, and the College of Education Azare.Azare Airstrip lies about 10 km southeast of the town.

== Demographics ==
The population has grown from 69,035 at the 1991 census to its 2007 estimated value of 110,452. In the last five years, the population has grown by more than 20%. It is the largest growing town in the state and region. Growth is prominent in all directions, with the creation of Bamako to the south-east, Unguwar Dankawu And Makara-huta Inuwa Dahiru Road to the north, Federal Lowcost-GRA to the northwest, and the extended growth in the south that sees the town engulfing places like Chilankori and Chara-Chara Yelwa.

The people of Azare are predominantly Muslim, and are primarily of Fulani ethnicity. The town's primary economic activity is agriculture.

== Local government area ==
Azare is the administrative centre of Katagum Local Government Area (LGA). The local government area is completely separate and does not include the eponymous city, which is rather the headquarters of Zaki LGA.

Both cities belong to the same historical Katagum emirate, which makes up the whole of Bauchi North, and used to belong to the same local government area.

== Gallery ==
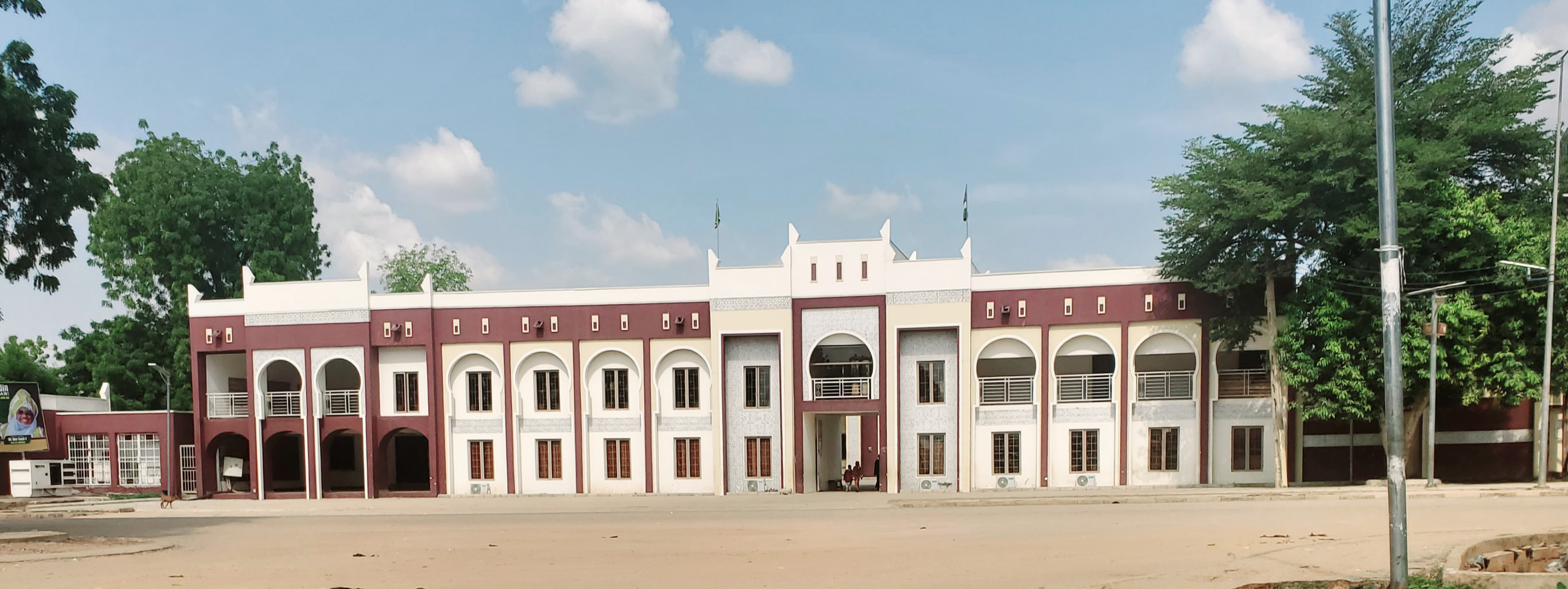

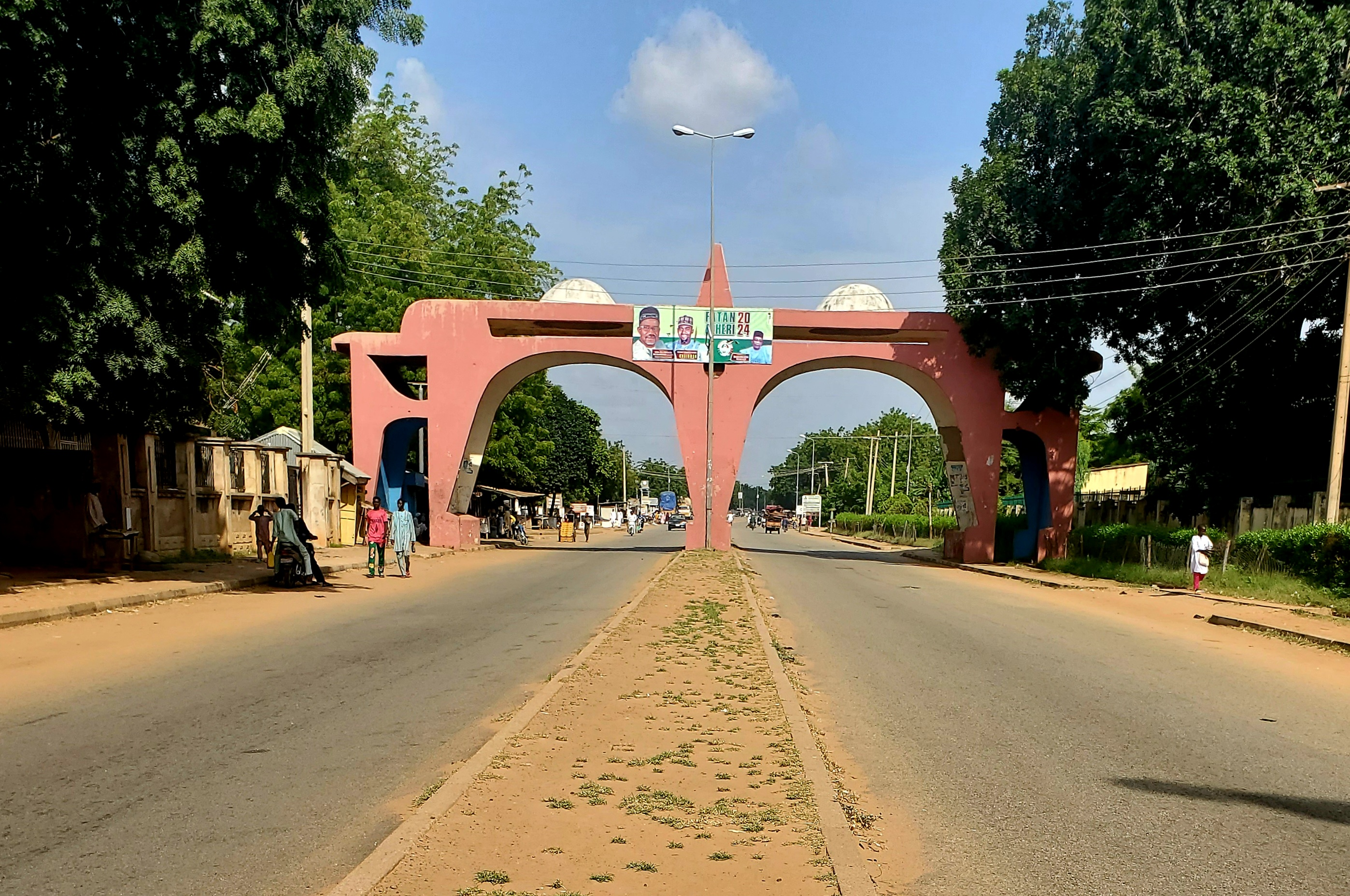

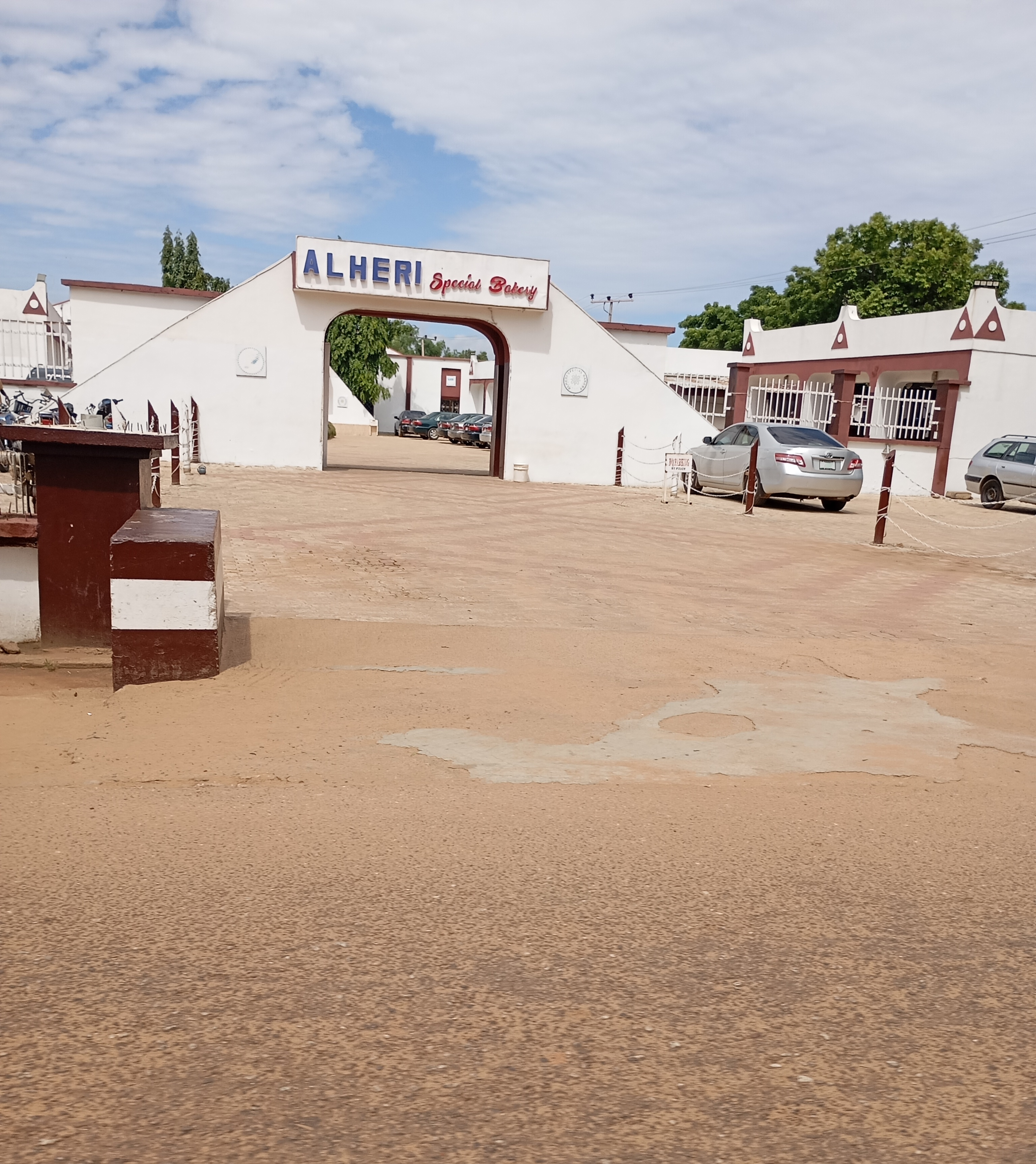

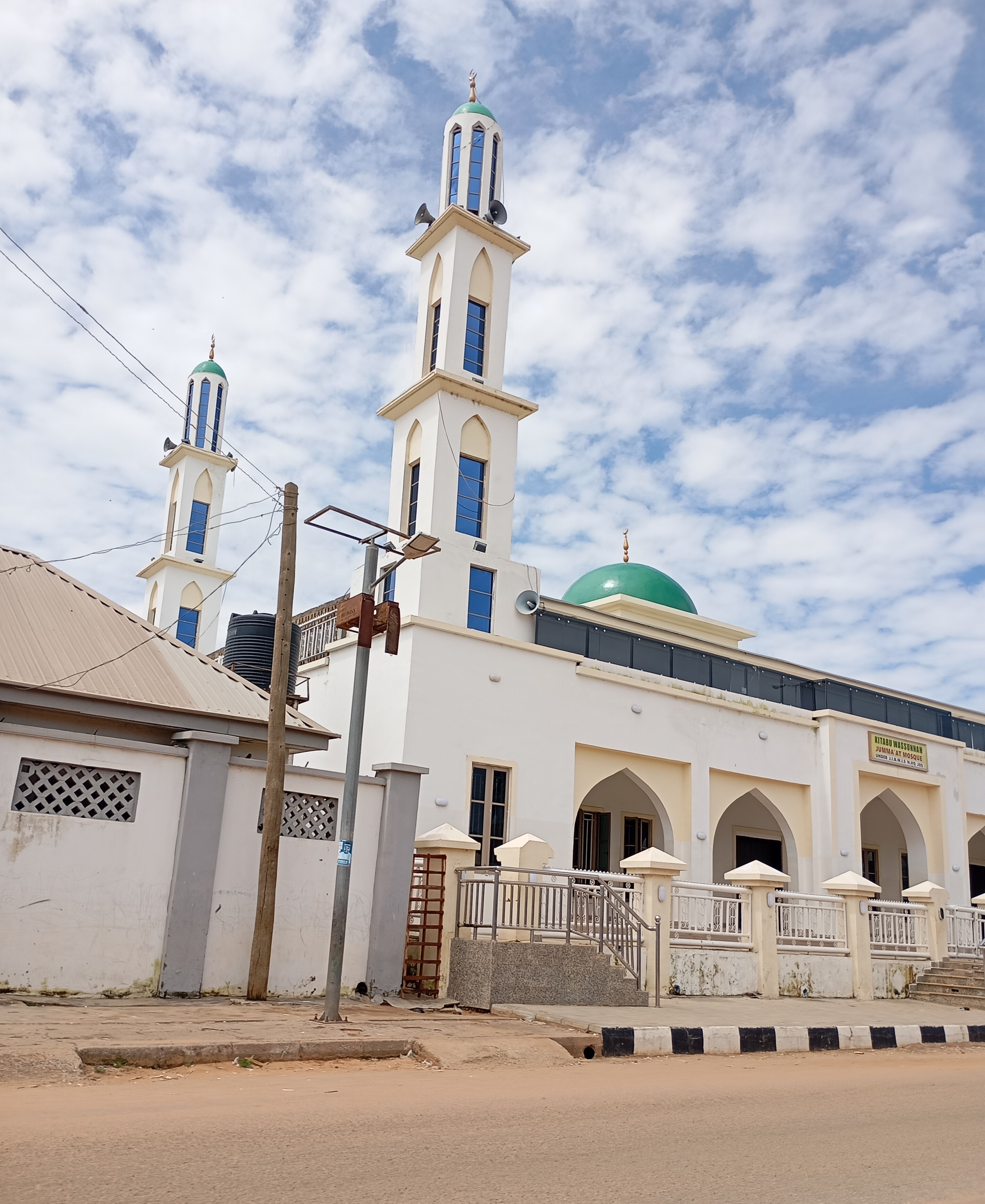

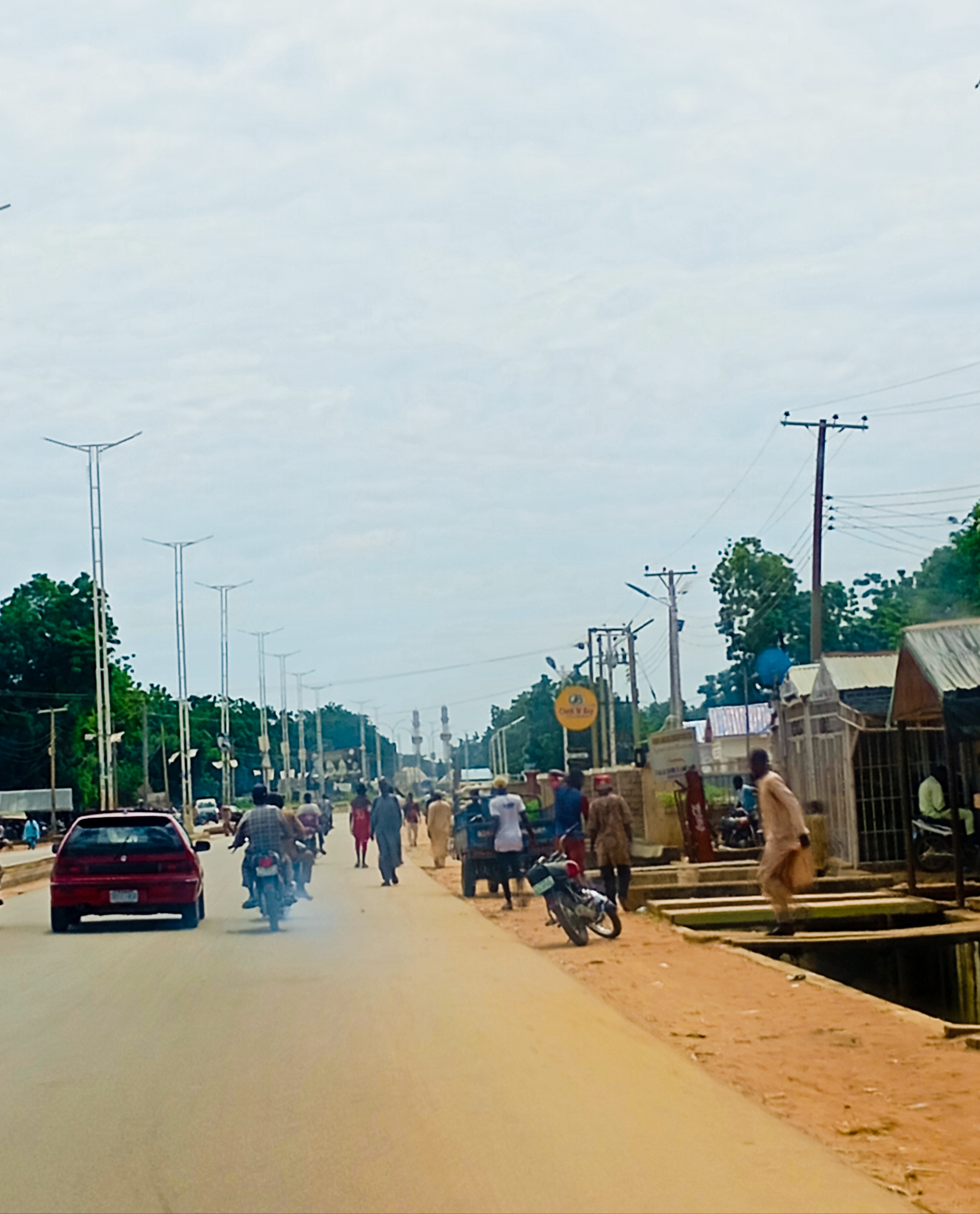

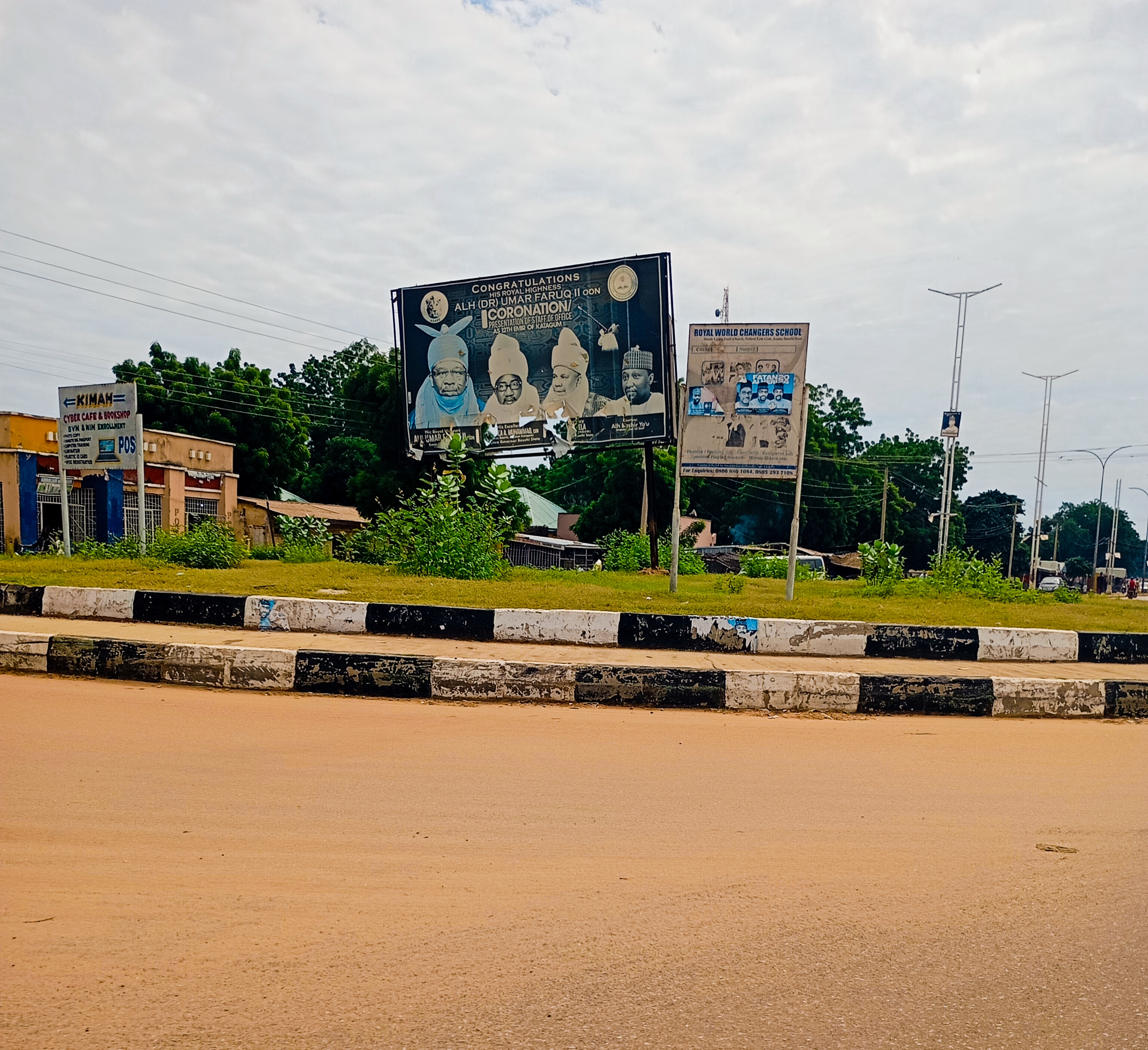

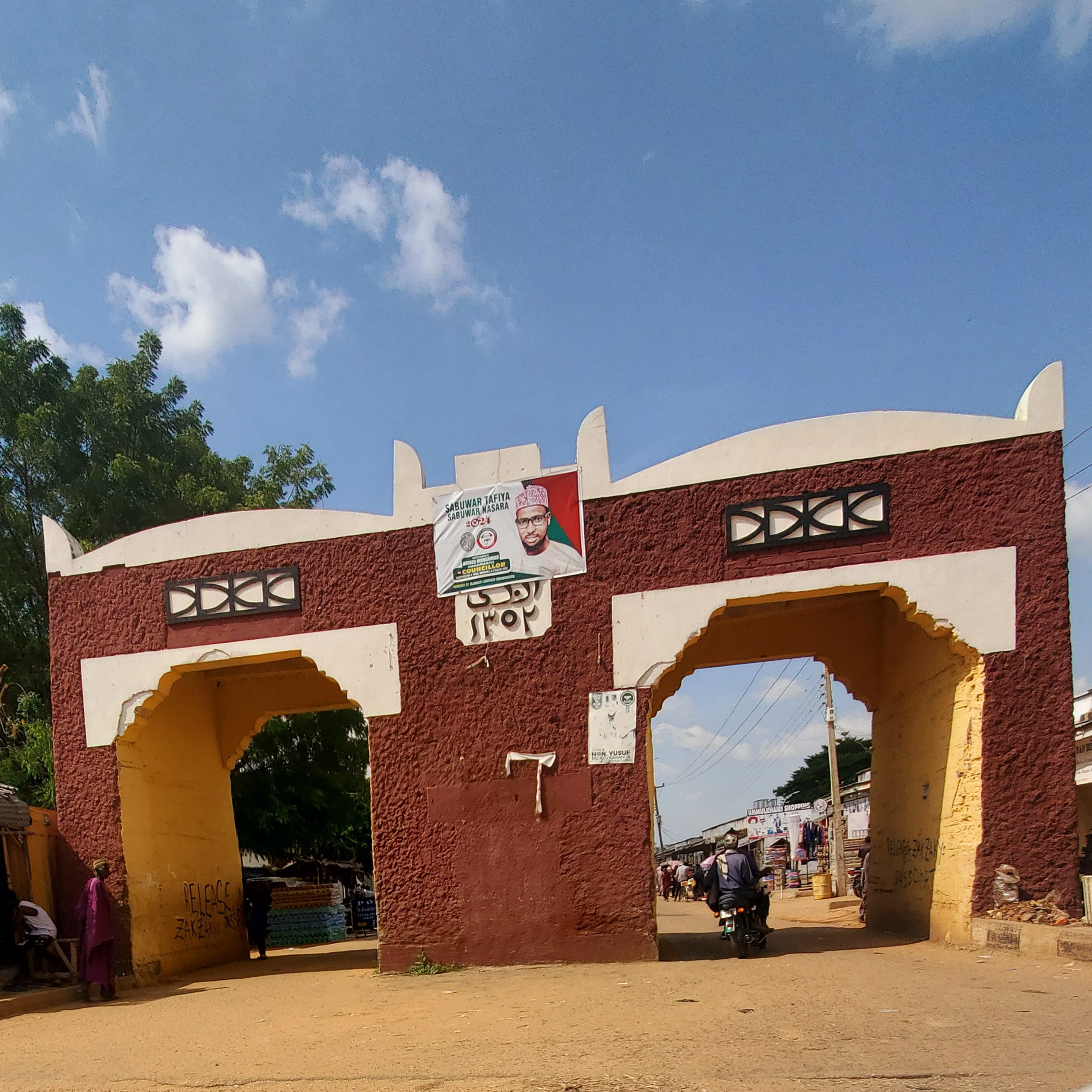

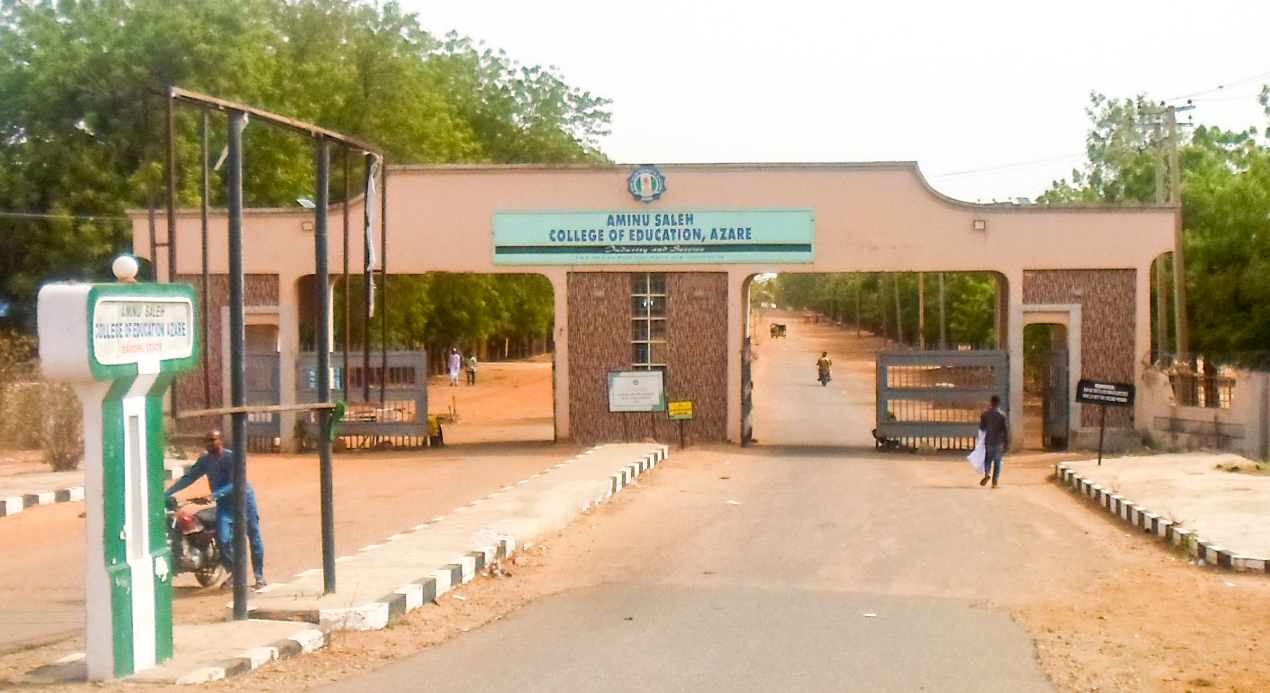

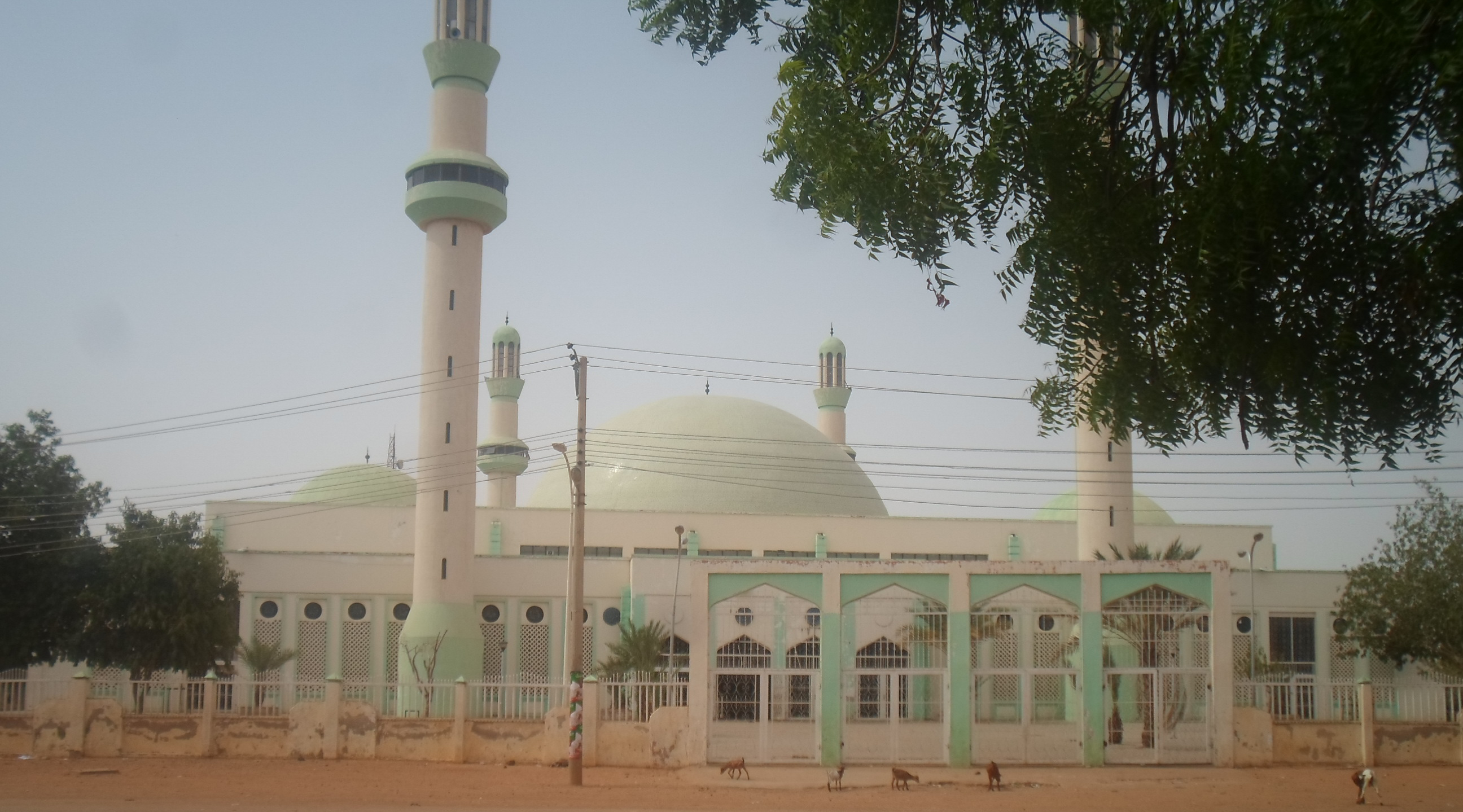

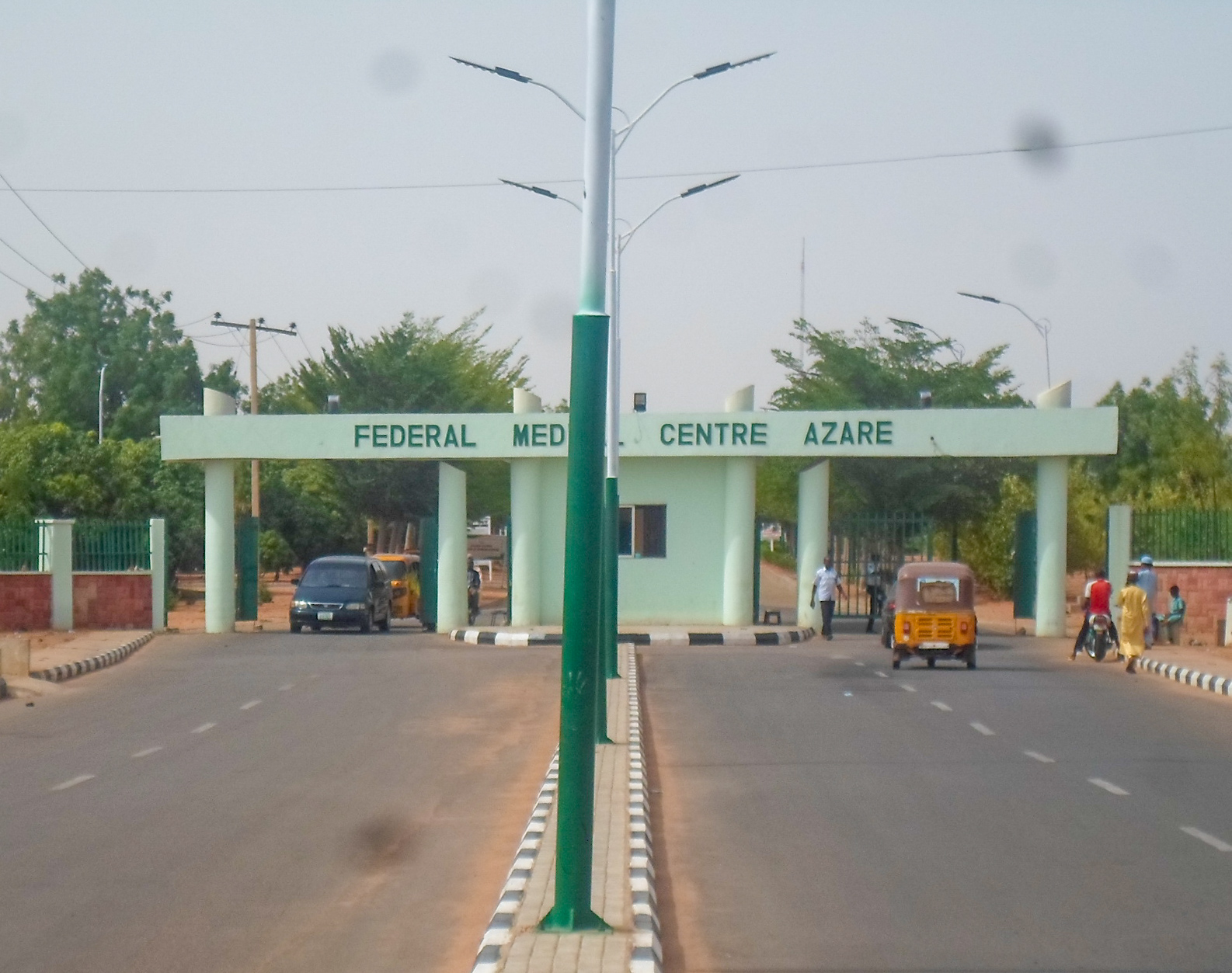

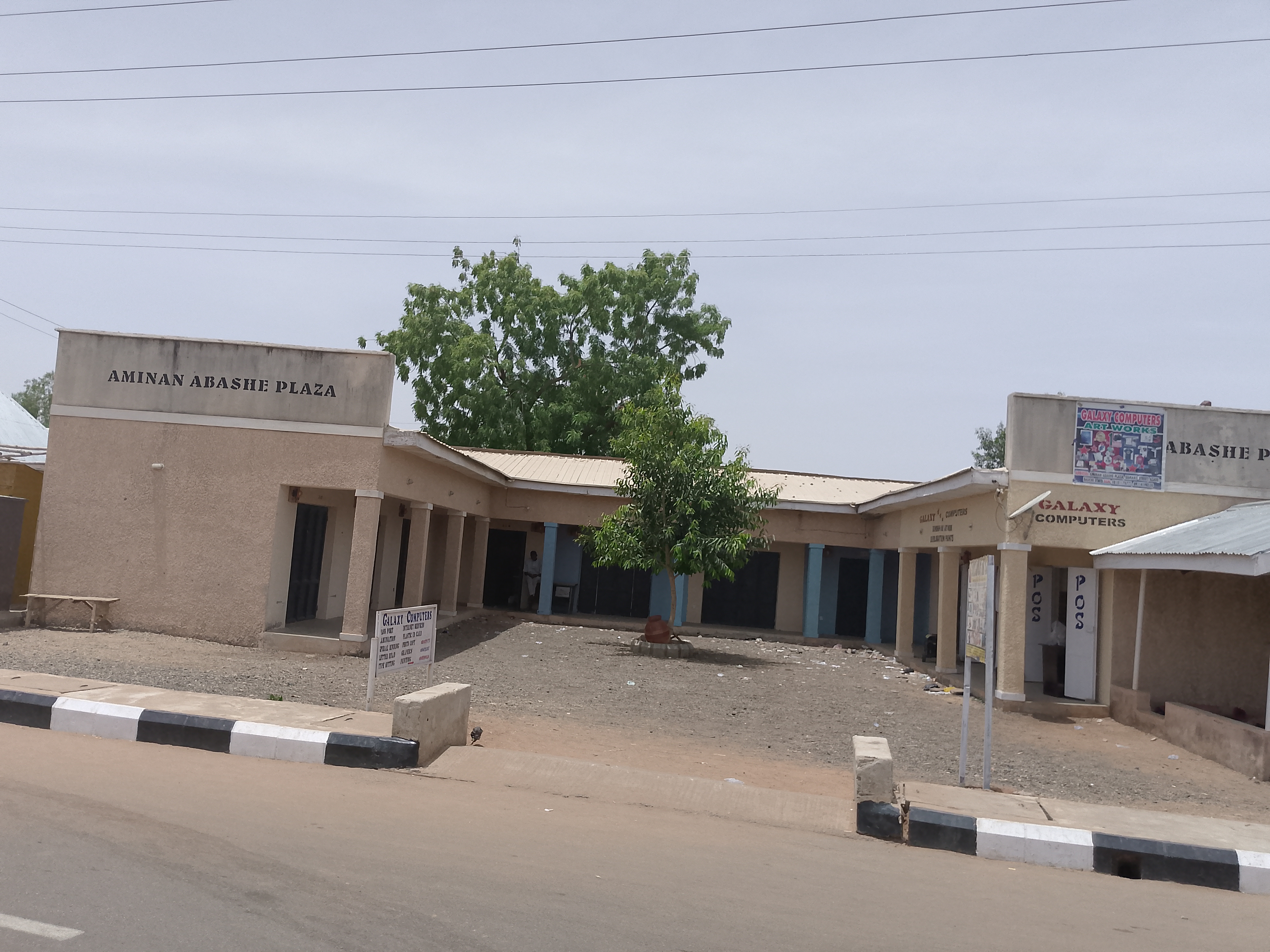

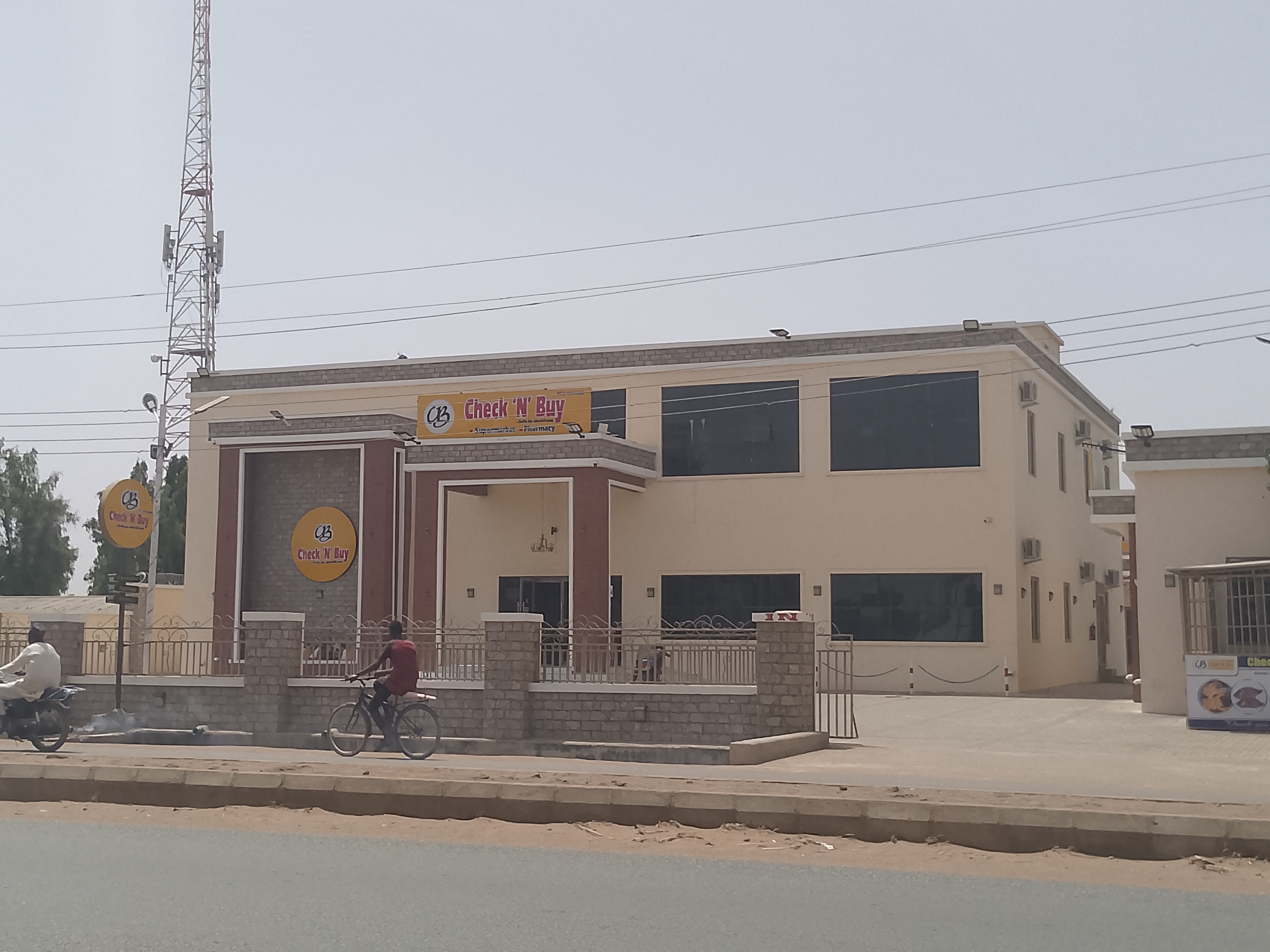

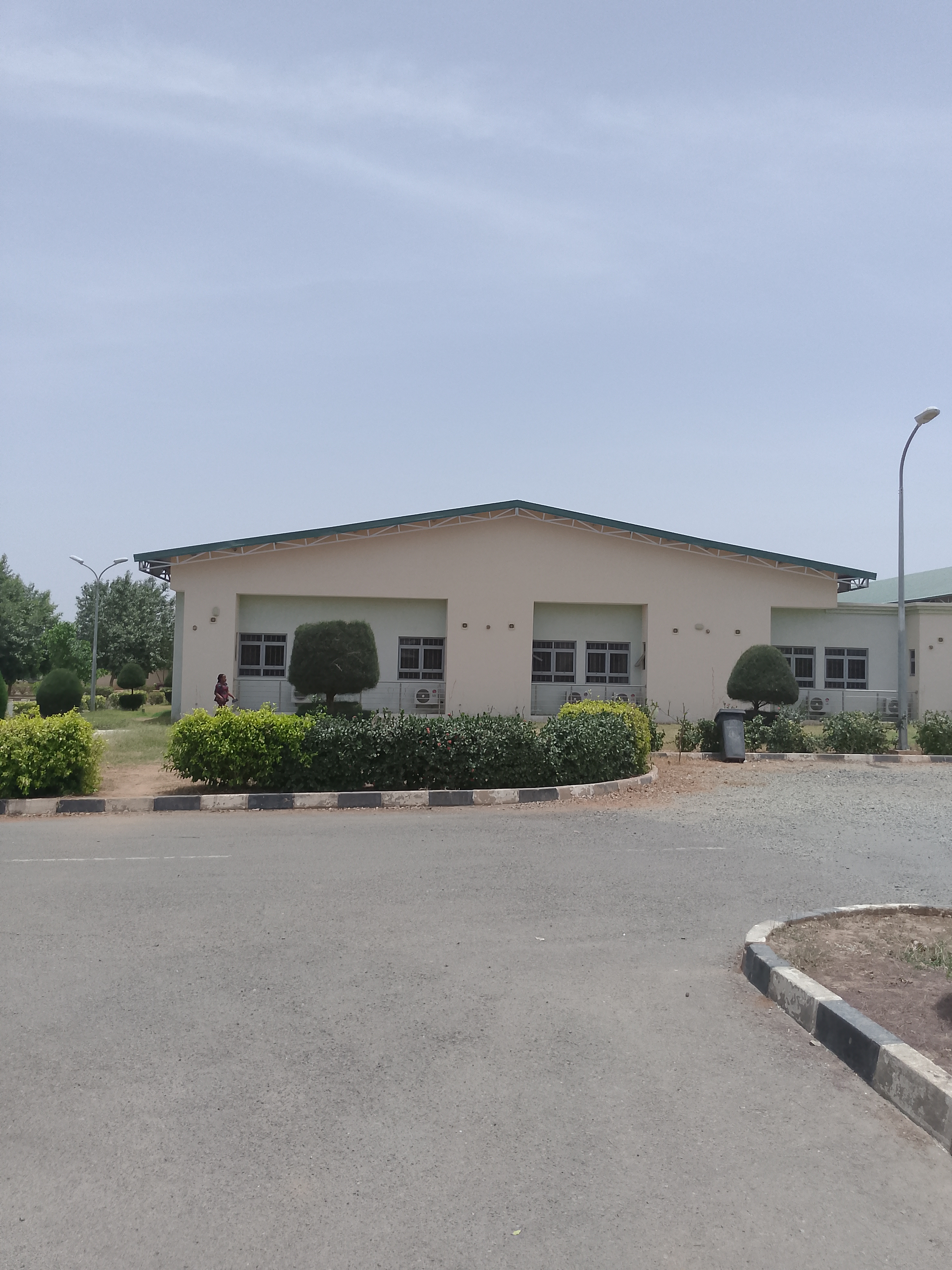
