= Foggo =

- Location in Nigeria
- Coordinates: 11°23′N 9°57′E
- Country: Nigeria
- State: Bauchi State
- LGA: Shira

Foggo is a town in Bauchi State, northern Nigeria some 150 km south-east of Kano, and about 40 km southwest of Azare.

== Geography ==
Foggo sits on the east bank of the Bunga River and is located 7 km southwest of Faggo. It has been on the edge of the Lake Chad basin, but the water surface level has dropped significantly as of 2026.

Foggo has an estimated population of 18,799.
