= Azare Airstrip =

- IATA: none; ICAO: none

Summary
- Airport type: Public
- Serves: Azare
- Elevation AMSL: 444 m / 1,458 ft
- Coordinates: 11°35′15″N 10°14′00″E

Map
- Location of the airport in Nigeria

Runways
Direction	Length		Surface
Direction	m	ft	Surface
13/31	2,005	6,578	Asphalt
- Source: Google Maps

Azare Airstrip, also known as Bauchi Airstrip, is an airstrip 10 kilometres (6 mi) south of Azare in Bauchi State, Nigeria.

The airport is about 198.2 km (123.2 mi) from Bauchi, or 245.5 km (152.5 mi) by Kafin Madaki – Kafin Liman – Gubi road. Azare airstrip has one unlighted runway made of asphalt.

== See also ==
- Transport in Nigeria
- List of airports in Nigeria
