= Gemma (surname) =

Gemma is a surname. Notable people with the name include:

- Alfred A. Gemma (born 1939), American politician
- Andrea Gemma (1931–2019), Italian Roman Catholic bishop
- Chiara Maria Gemma (born 1968), Italian politician
- Cornelius Gemma (1535–1578), Dutch physician, astronomer and astrologer
- Giuliano Gemma, (1938–2013), Italian actor
- Roberta Gemma (born 1980), Italian actress
- Vera Gemma (born 1970), Italian film actress

== See also ==
- Gemma (given name)
