= Sainte-Gemme =

Sainte-Gemme may refer to the following places in France:

- Sainte-Gemme, Charente-Maritime, a commune in the Charente-Maritime department
- Sainte-Gemme, Gers, a commune in the Gers department
- Sainte-Gemme, Gironde, a commune in the Gironde department
- Sainte-Gemme, Indre, a commune in the Indre department
- Sainte-Gemme, Marne, a commune in the Marne department
- Sainte-Gemme, Deux-Sèvres, a commune in the Deux-Sèvres department
- Sainte-Gemme, Tarn, a commune in the Tarn department
