= Gemma Newman =

British medical doctor and nutritionist

- Occupations: Doctor, author

Gemma Newman known as the Plant Power Doctor is a British medical doctor, nutritionist, author and advocate of whole food plant-based nutrition.

== Biography ==
Newman studied at the University of Wales College of Medicine and has worked as a medical doctor since 2004. She is a general practitioner and Senior Partner at The Orchard Surgery in Ashford, Surrey. She is also a qualified Reiki practitioner for the purpose of pain relief. Newman is an ambassador of Plant-Based Health Professionals UK. She has been featured on Channel 4, Channel 5, ITV, and Sky News Sunrise. Newman appeared in the film Vegan 2018. She was a speaker at VegfestUK and VegMed Web 2021. Newman has supported the campaign "No Meat May", a plea for the public to give up eating meat for a month.

Newman promotes a whole food plant-based (WFPB) diet to her patients. Her WFPB diet excludes all animal source foods and emphasises the consumption of fruits, vegetables, legumes, wholegrains, nuts, and seeds consumed in their natural state as opposed to heavily processed versions. She has argued that this way of eating provides dietary fiber for gut health and plenty of antioxidants and phytochemicals that can reduce the risk of bowel cancer, heart disease, type 2 diabetes, and autoimmune conditions. Newman authored The Plant Power Doctor in 2021 which includes WFPB recipes. It was nominated for the VegfestUK 2021 Favourite Plant-Based Book of the Year.

== Selected publications ==
- The Plant Power Doctor: A Simple Prescription for a Healthier You. Penguin, 2021. ISBN 9781529107746
- Get Well, Stay Well: The Six Healing Health Habits You Need to Know. Ebury Press, 2023. ISBN 9781529107692
