= Jemma (given name) =

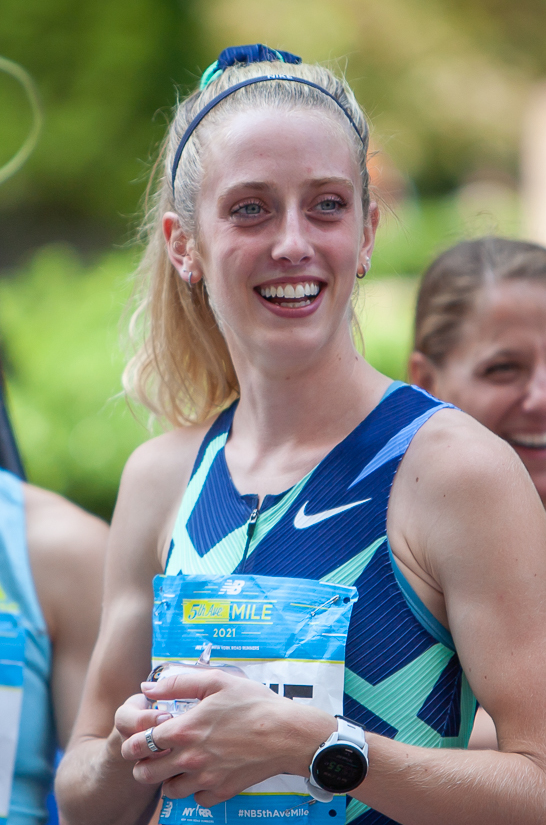
Jemma Reekie at the 2021 5th Avenue Mile awards ceremony

Jemma is a female given name and variant spelling of Gemma, meaning gem. It may refer to the following people :

- Jemma Ananyan (1931–2018), Armenian politician
- Jemma Dallender (born 1988), English film actress
- Jemma Dolan, member of the Northern Ireland Assembly;
- Jemma Griffiths (born 1975), birth name of Welsh singer Jem;
- Jemma Lilley (born 1991), English crime fiction writer and murderer
- Jemma McKenzie-Brown (born 1994), English actress
- Jemma Mitchell (born 1984), British–Australian woman convicted of murder
- Jemma Redgrave (born 1965), British actress
- Jemma Rose (born 1992), English footballer
- Jemma Wellesley, Countess of Mornington (born 1974), British make up artist and model.

== Fictional characters ==
- Jemma Simmons, an Agents of S.H.I.E.L.D. character
