= Gemma Nelson =

British mixed media painter

- Born: 1984 (age 41–42); West Yorkshire, England
- Education: Slade School of Fine Art
- Website: gemmanelson.co.uk

Gemma Nelson (born 1984, West Yorkshire, UK) is a mixed media painter based in London. Her work explores themes of glamour, femininity and obsessive behavior. Nelson studied at The Slade School of Fine Art, London, graduating in 2007.

She was shortlisted for the Channel 4 / Saatchi Gallery's 2007 4 New Sensations prize and this generated significant interest in her work.

Nelson was also a finalist in the Nationwide Mercury Art Prize 2007.

Nelson has also exhibited at the Laure Genillard Gallery in London, Coombe Gallery in Devon and Bloomberg New Contemporaries 2008 in Liverpool as part of the European Capital of Culture year and London.
