= Gema Sevillano =

Spanish Paralympic swimmer and paratriathlete (1972–2019)

Personal information
- Full name: Gema Sevillano Ordoñez
- Born: 17 July 1972 Aruba
- Died: 13 May 2019 (aged 46) L'Hospitalet de Llobregat

Sport
- Country: Spain
- Sport: Paralympic swimming
- Disability class: B1

Gema Sevillano Ordoñez (17 July 1972 – 13 May 2019) was a Spanish Paralympic swimmer and paratriathlete. She was a Spanish triathlon champion in 2012.
