= Faggo =

- Location in Nigeria
- Coordinates: 11°24′25″N 10°00′52″E
- Country: Nigeria
- State: Bauchi State
- LGA: Shira

Faggo is a town in Bauchi State, Nigeria.

== Geography ==
Faggo is located at 11°24′25″N 10°00′52″E, and has a population of 12,821. It is located 35 km southwest of Azare and 7 km northeast of Foggo.
