= Alfred A. Gemma =

American politician

Member of the Rhode Island House of Representatives from the 20th district
- In office 4 January 2005 – 4 January 2011
- Preceded by: Paul V. Sherlock (D-20)
- Succeeded by: David Bennett (D-20)

Personal details
- Born: January 27, 1939 (age 87)
- Party: Democratic
- Spouse: Ann
- Children: Marcus, Jessica, Joshua
- Education: Providence College, Brown University
- Profession: Businessman, Auto body shop owner

Alfred A. Gemma (born 1939) is an American politician who is a former Democratic member of the Rhode Island House of Representatives, representing the 20th District from 2005, following his special election victory to fill the seat of the deceased Representative Paul V. Sherlock, to January 2011. Gemma had previously served on the City Council of Warwick, Rhode Island. During the 2009-2010 sessions, he served on the House Committees on Corporation, Separation of Powers, Veterans Affairs and Oversight, and served Deputy Majority Leader. Gemma lost his bid for reelection in the 14 September 2010 Democratic primary to David A. Bennett, who went on to be elected in the 2 November general election.

Gemma is an auto body shop owner, currently owning Al Gemma's Auto Body in Warwick RI. He previously owned Courtland Auto Body in Providence RI.
