= Gema Martínez López =

Mexican politician

- Born: 28 November 1950 (age 75); Mexico City, Mexico
- Occupation: Politician
- Political party: PRI

Gema Isabel Martínez López (born 28 November 1950) is a Mexican politician affiliated with the Institutional Revolutionary Party. As of 2014 she served as Deputy of the LIX Legislature of the Mexican Congress as a plurinominal representative.
