= Gemma Cowling =

21st-century Australian model

- Born: Adelaide, South Australia

Gemma Cowling is an Australian model. She is the first Australian-born transgender model to be signed with an agency.

== Biography ==
Cowling was born and raised in Adelaide, South Australia. She came out as a transgender woman and began transitioning after completing school, stating that she didn't feel like school was a safe and inclusive place for her to do so.

She made her runway modeling debut in 2016 at the Adelaide Fashion Festival. Later that year, at the age of nineteen, Cowling became the first Australian-born transgender model to sign with an agency. She was first signed with Azalea Models. She later signed with Milk Models and Chadwick Models. In 2017 Cowling became the face of TONI & GUY's new campaign You Define You.

Cowling has spoken out about people in the fashion industry exploiting her and other transgender models because of their gender identity in order to make a brand seem progressive.
