= Gemma Galdón-Clavell =

Spanish technology policy analyst

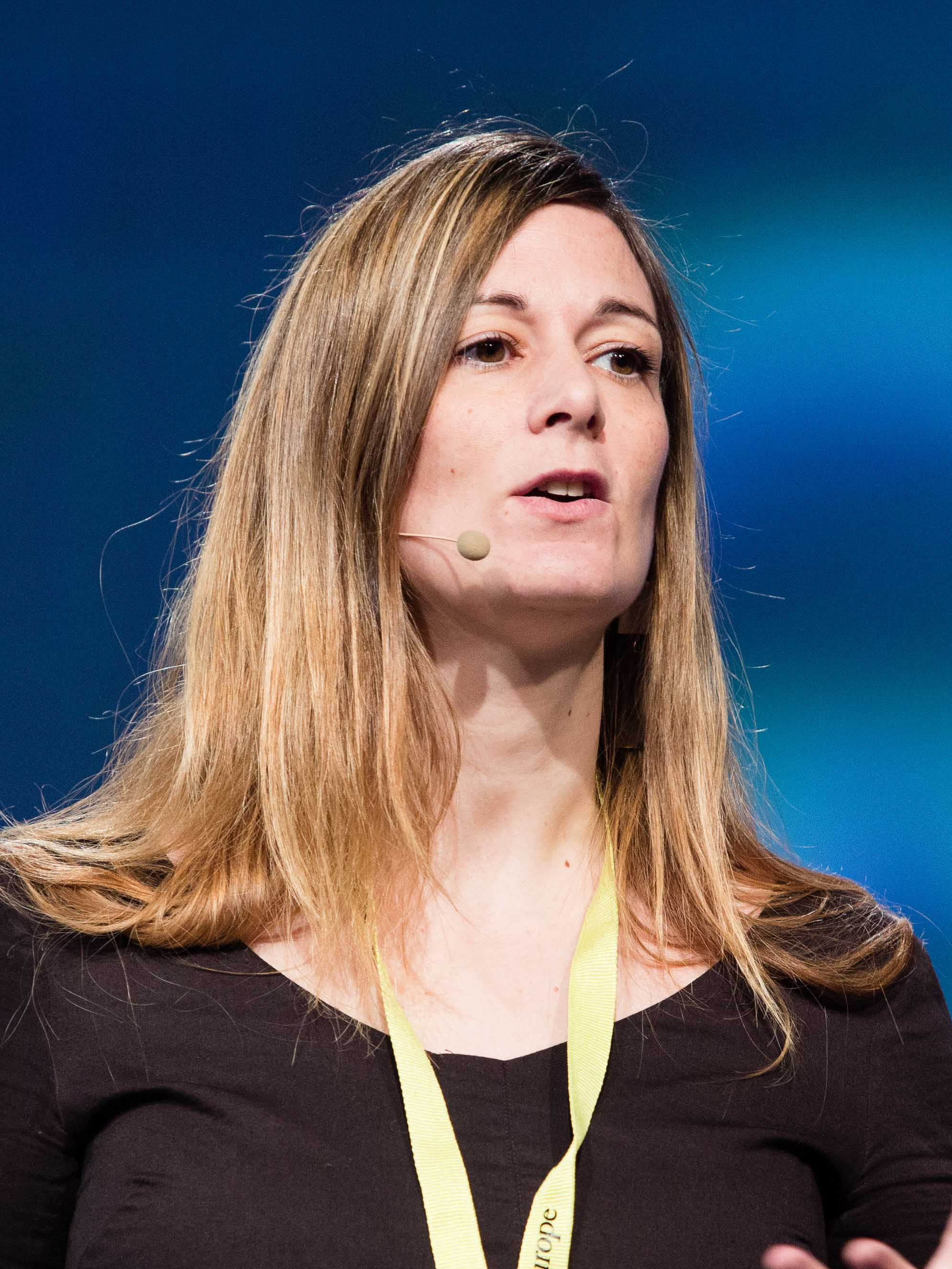
- Gemma Galdón at Re publica in 2015
- Born: 1976 (age 49–50); Mataró (Barcelona)
- Education: PhD, Autonomous University of Barcelona
- Occupation: technology policy analyst
- Organization: Eticas.ai
- Known for: Founder and CEO of Eticas Foundation & Eticas Consulting

Gemma Galdón-Clavell (born 1976) is a Spanish technology policy analyst who specializes in ethics and algorithmic accountability. Forbes Magazine described her as “a leading voice on tech ethics and algorithmic accountability”.

== Early life and education ==
Galdón was born in Mataró (Catalonia, Spain) in 1976. After completing a BA in Contemporary History and a MA in Public Management at the Autonomous University of Barcelona, she also completed her PhD there concerning surveillance, security and urban policy. She was also appointed Director of the Security Policy Programme and MA in Security Policy at the Universitat Oberta de Catalunya (UOC). In 2008 she was the coordinator of the Barcelona office of the United Nations' Institute for Training and Research (UNITAR).

=== Political background and activism ===
In the early 2000s, Galdón-Clavell was involved in the alter-globalization movement. In 2005, she joined the Amsterdan based think tank Transnational Institute (TNI), an organization promoting a "just, democratic and sustainable world", as defined on their website. She joined Initiative for Catalonia Greens and ran as a list candidate in the 2011 Barcelona municipal elections, though not as the top candidate.

After the Ant-austerity movement in Spain, she served as executive board member of Podemos between 2014 and 2016, being responsible for the area of technology, privacy and security.

== Career ==
She is the founder and CEO of Eticas Foundation and Eticas.ai, organisations focused on identifying black box algorithmic vulnerabilities and retrain AI-powered technology with better source data and content. In 2017 she was a finalist for the EU's prize for women innovators.

She is concerned with how security, resilience, policing and privacy are considered in smart cities. The BBC selected her as one of the “people changing the world” in 2020.

In May 2021, she and colleague Emma Lopez, were addressing the Response-ability Summit which aimed to "champion socially responsible tech" on their approach to making Artificial Intelligence accountable using audits.

In November 2022, Galdón-Clavell co-founded the International Association of Algorithimc auditors.

Galdón is the co-author of several books and book chapters and she is also a frequent columnist in the Spanish media. I

== Awards ==
Gemma Galdon was a finalist for the 2017 European Union Women Innovators Award and was selected by Ashoka as a 2020 Social Entrepreneur. In 2023 she received one of the Hispanic Star Awards, awards for agents of change in the Spanish-speaking community given to people who are having a transformative impact in different sectors of society. In 2024 she was honored by Mozilla in the Rise25 awards in the entrepreneurship category for her role in Eticas.ai.
