= Jama'are =

Jama'are Garin Fulani Gandun masu
- City and LGA
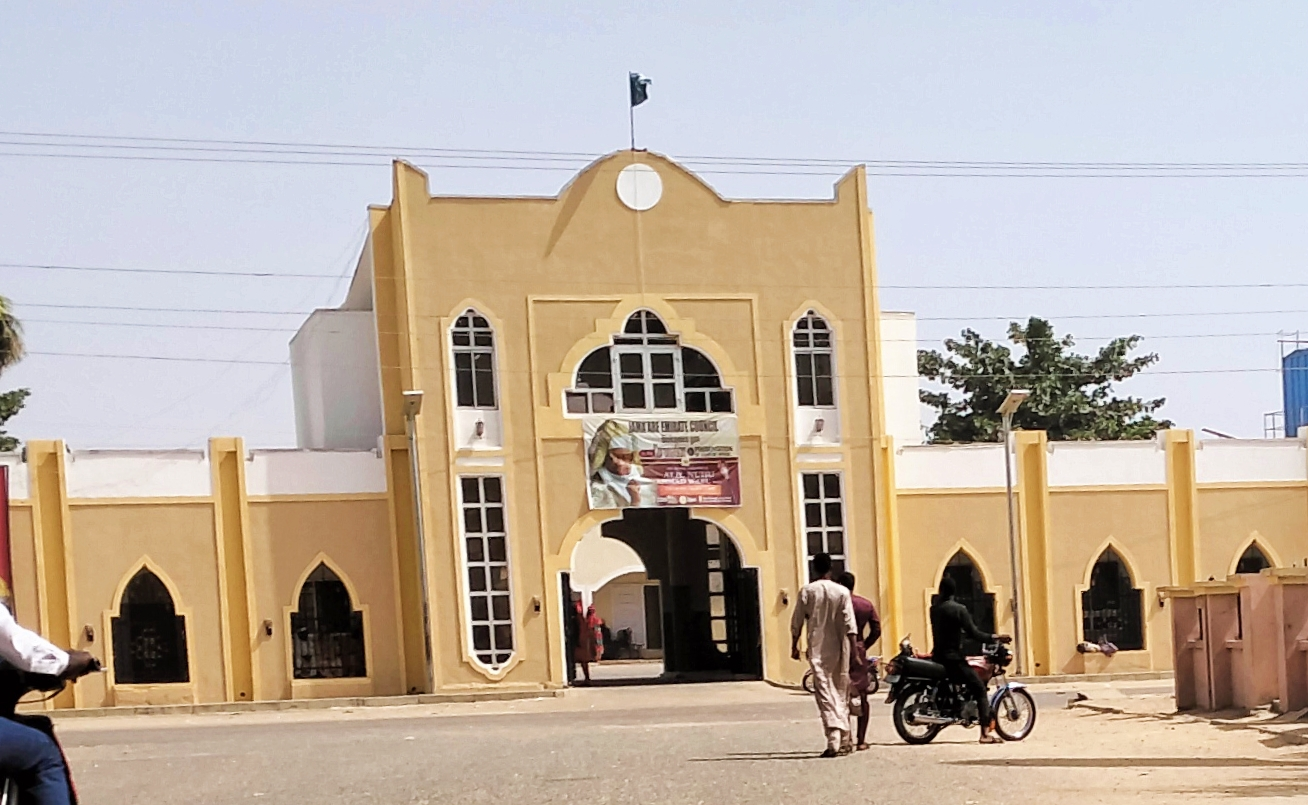
- Jama'are Emirate Palace Gate
- Nickname: Garin Wabi
- Motto: Jama'are garin fulani
- Interactive map of Jama'are
- Country: Nigeria
- State: Bauchi State
- Established: since 1870

Government
  - Type: Democracy
  - Emir: HRH Nuhu Ahmad wabi
  - Local Government Chairman: Inuwa Abdullahi

Area
  - Total: 341.6 km^{2} (131.9 sq mi)

Population (2022)
  - Total: 209,800
  - Density: 614.2/km^{2} (1,591/sq mi)
- Time zone: UTC+1 (WAT)
- Postal code: 751

Jama'are is a city and Local Government Area in northern Bauchi State, Nigeria. The LGA has an area of 341.6 km^{2} and a population of 176,883 at the 2006 census. The postal code of the area is 751. It is populated by a Fulani tribe that migrated from Dulare in the Lake Chad basin in the Republic of Chad.

Jama'are has an estimated population of 165,100 and occupies an area of 341.6 km². Most of the inhabitants of Jama′are are members of the Fulani, Shirawa, Kanuri, but Fulani is the most prominent tribe in the area. The commonly spoken languages in the area are Hausa and the Fufulde while the religions of Islam and Christianity are widely practiced in Jama'are. Jama'are is the host of Federal College of Education Jama'are, General Hospital Jama'are and Jama'are Emirate. There is also a primary teacher-training college and a leprosy clinic in the town. It is made up of a number of towns and villages which include Dogon, Jeji, Hanafari, Galdimari and Jurara.

== History ==
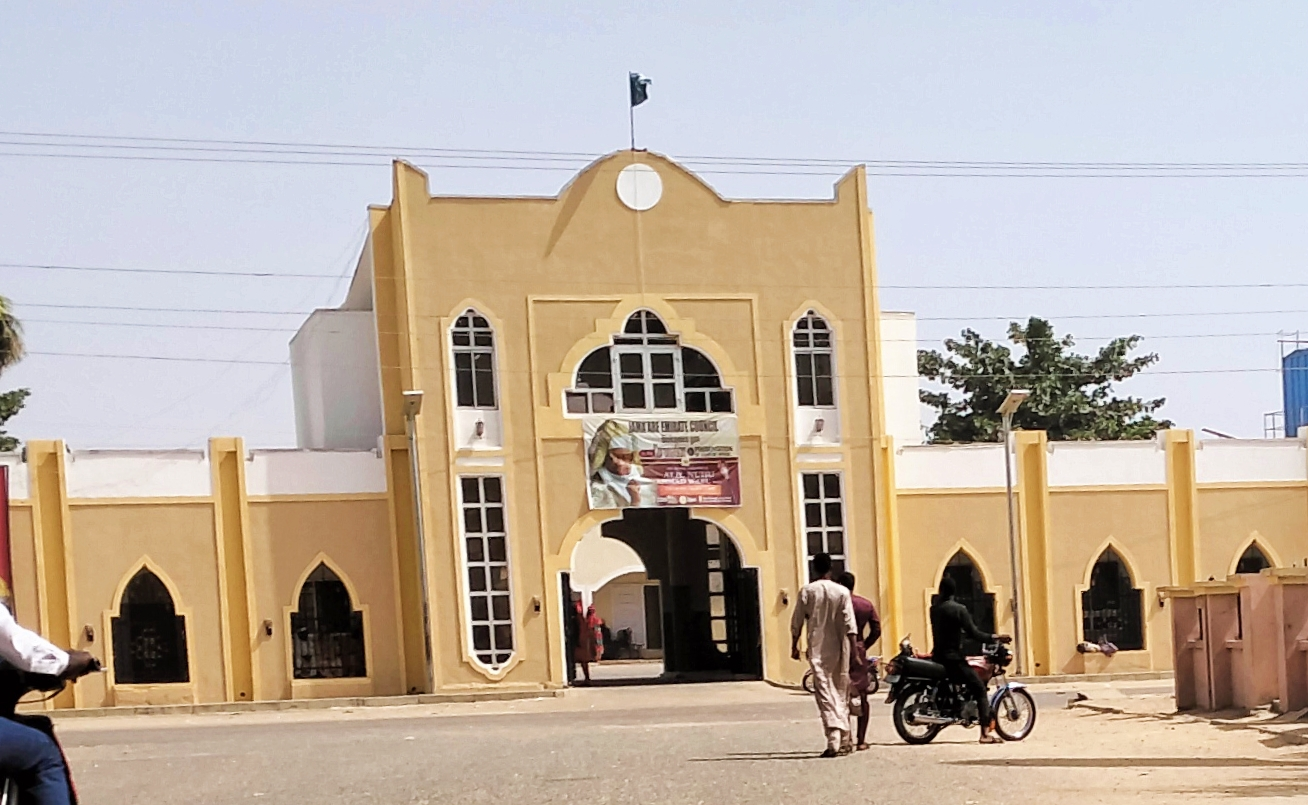
Jama'are emir's Palace

Traditionally founded in 1811 by Muhammadu Wabi I, a leader in the Fulani jihad (holy war) led by Usman dan Fodio, the emirate was not officially recognized until 1835, when Sambolei, the chief of the Jama’are Fulani, was rewarded with it for his aid against the Hausa rebels of Katsina by Muḥammad Bello, the sarkin musulmi (“commander of the faithful”) and sultan of Sokoto. Emir Muhammadu Maude built the walls (20 feet [6 m] high with four gates) of Jama'are town in the 1850s, but the town barely survived attacks by the forces of Emir Buhari of Hadejia in the 1850s and 1860s. Jama'are’s emir Muhammadu Wabi II submitted to the British after the fall of Kano city to the latter in 1903. Incorporated into the Katagum division of Kano province, Jama'are was transferred to Bauchi province in 1926 and became part of Bauchi state in 1976.

== Climate ==
It has an average temperature of 31 °C (87.8 °F). The famous Jama'are River flows through the LGA and the average humidity level of the area is around 41%. The rainy season is hot, oppressive, and mostly cloudy and the dry season is sweltering and partly cloudy. Over the course of the year, the temperature typically varies from 13.3 °C (56 °F) to 40 °C (104 °F) and is rarely below 10 °C (50 °F) or above 42.2 °C (108 °F). The average wind speed in Jama'are LGA is estimated at 12 km/h (7.4 mph).

== Agriculture ==
Farming is the major economic activity of the people of Jama'are and crops such as cotton, cowpea, peanuts (groundnuts), cotton, sorghum, millet, and onions, cowpeas, and vegetables are being cultivated in the area. They also rear animals such domestic animals like goats, rams, cattle, sheep, donkeys, and horses. Other important economic enterprises undertaken by the people of Jama'are are trade, hunting, and the weaving and dyeing of cotton.

== Education ==
The Federal College of Education Jama'are was founded in 2020.

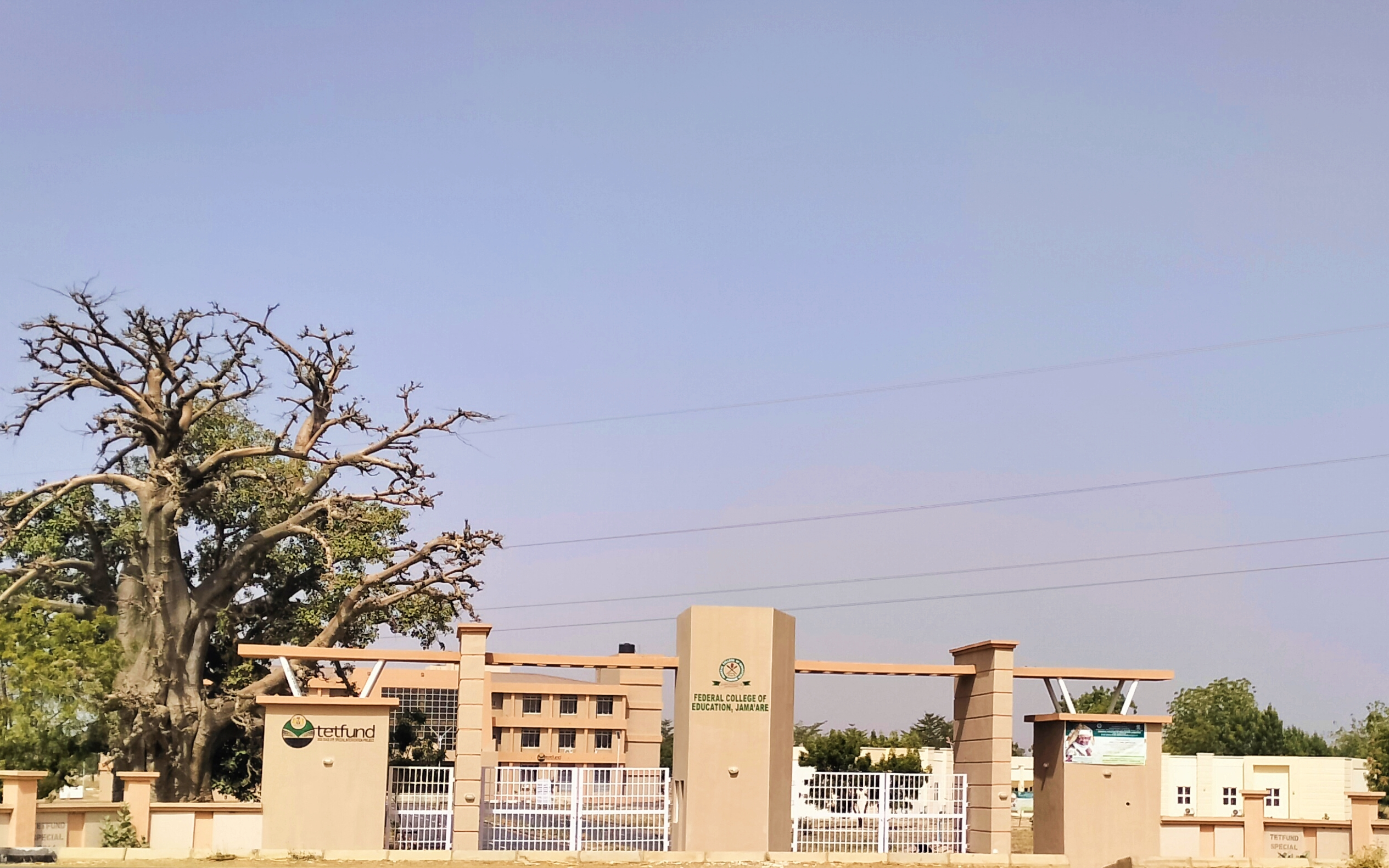
FCE Jama'are Gate

== Gallery ==
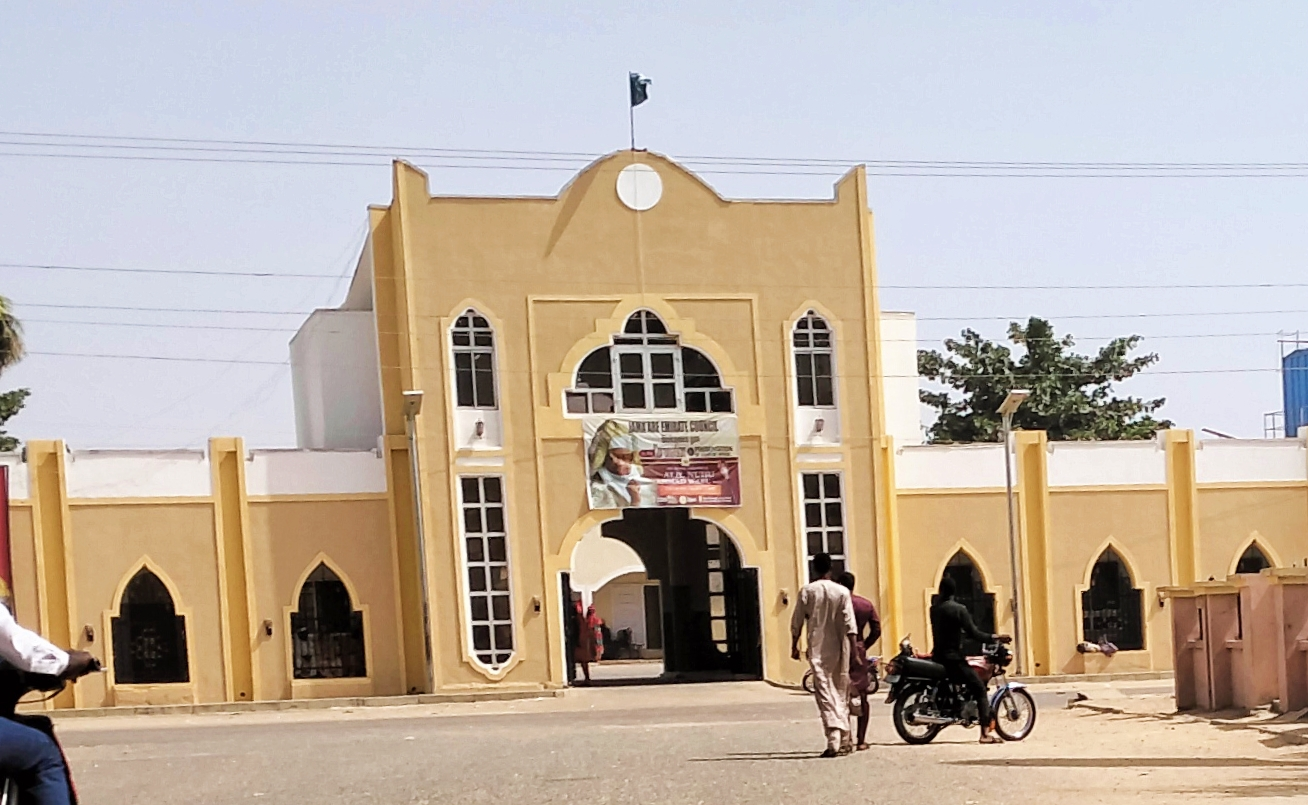

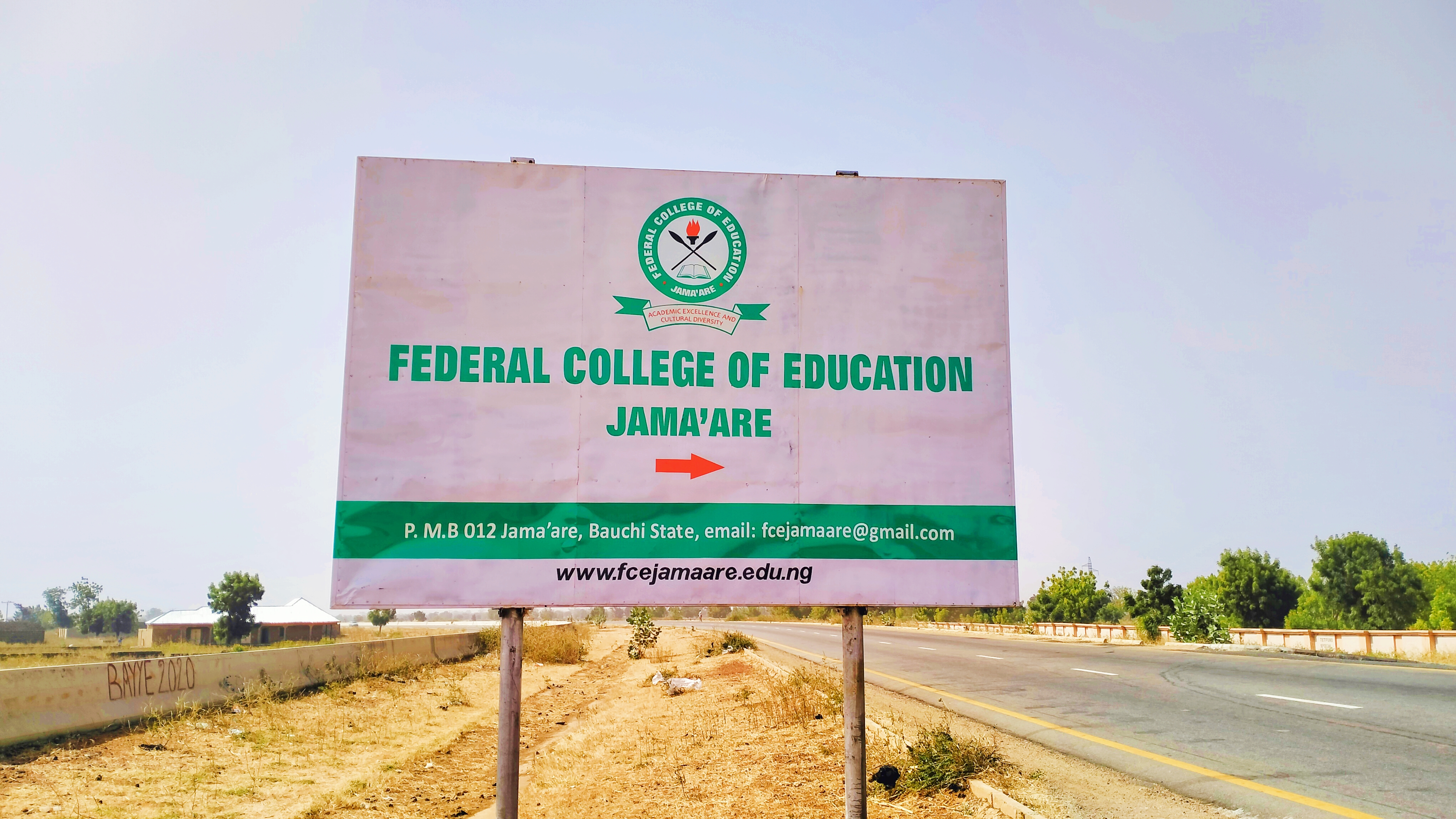

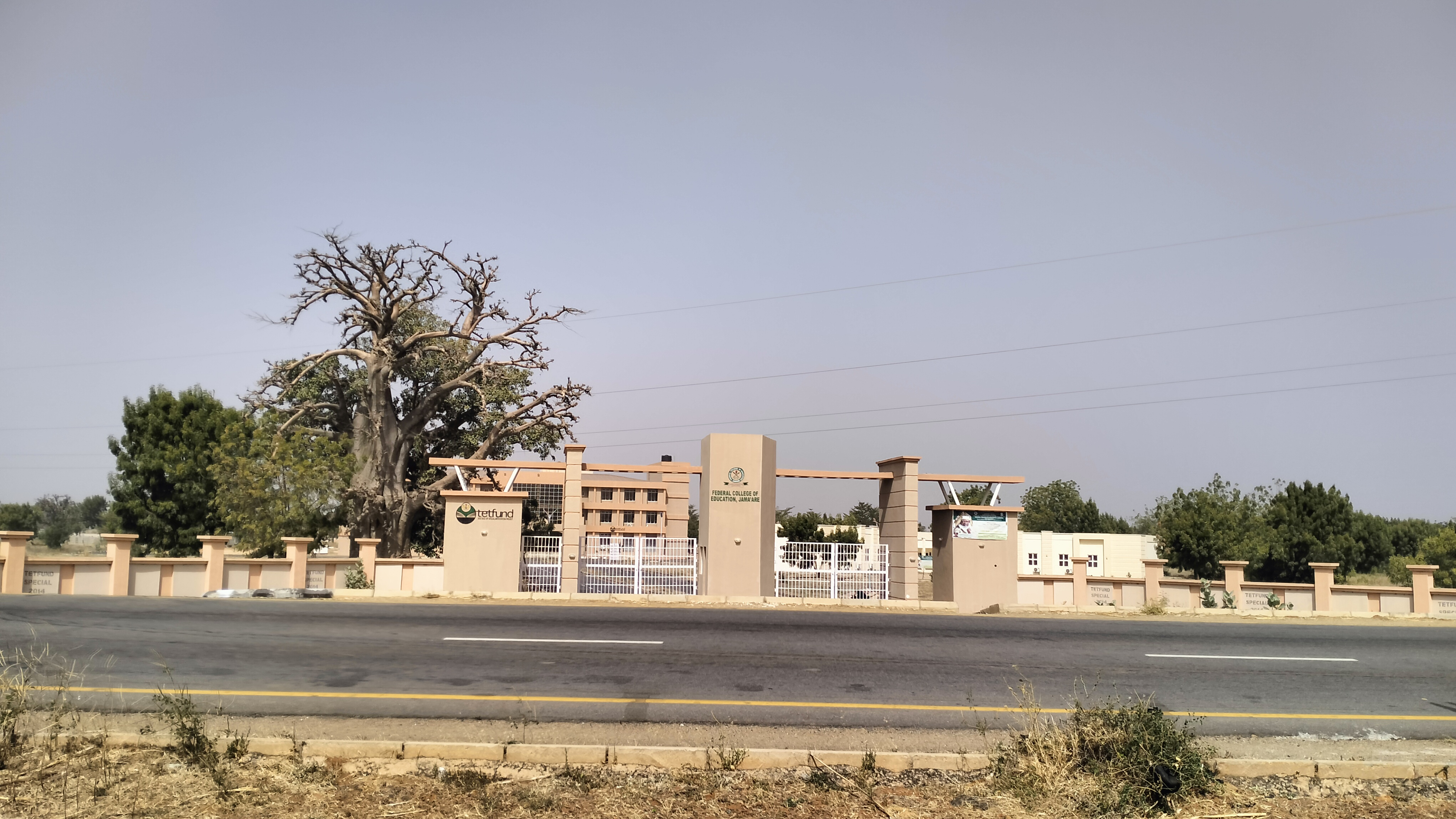

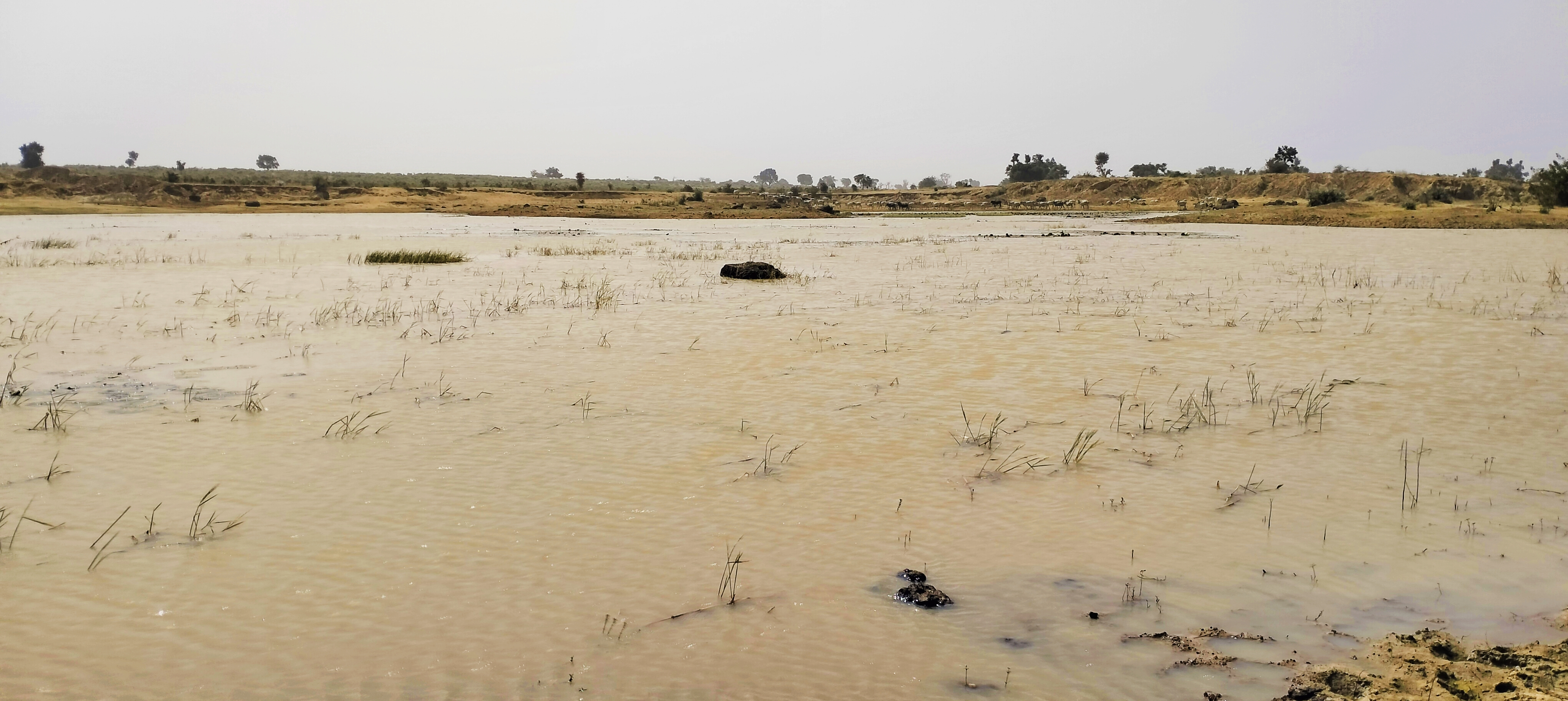

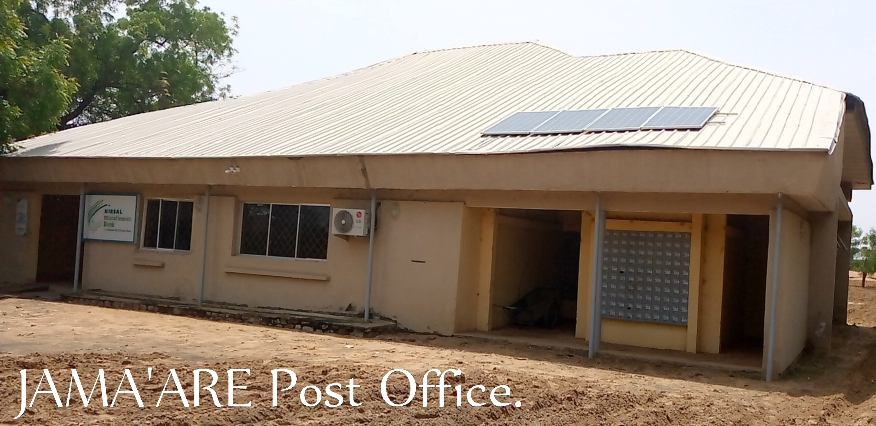
