= Gass (surname) =

Gass is a surname. Notable people with this surname include:

- A. J. Gass (born 1975), Canadian football player
- Alison Gass, American curator and museum director
- Bob Gass, American-based Irish Christian pastor, broadcaster and author
- Charles George Gass (1898–1977), Royal Air Force officer, gunner ace in World War I
- Clare Gass (1887–1968), Canadian military nurse and social worker
- Craig Gass (born 1970), American actor, comedian, and impressionist
- Daniela Gass (born 1980), German racing cyclist
- Elizabeth Gass, Lady Gass (born 1940), Lord Lieutenant of Somerset, England
- Floyd Gass (1927–2006), American football and basketball player, coach, and college athletics administrator
- Glenn Gass (born 1956), American educator
- Ian Graham Gass (1926–1992), British geologist, Professor of Earth Sciences at the Open University
- Jack Gass, 19th century American football player
- John Bradshaw Gass (1855–1939), British architect and artist
- John Donald MacIntyre Gass (1928–2005), Canadian-American ophthalmologist
- Karl Gass (1917–2009), German documentary filmmaker
- Kyle Gass (born 1960), American rock musician, singer-songwriter and actor
- Linda Gass, American environmental activist and artist
- Melbourne Gass (1938–2018), Canadian businessman and former politician
- Michael Gass (1916–1983), British colonial administrator
- Michelle Gass, American businesswoman
- Nabo Gass (born 1954), German painter and glass artist
- Neville Gass (1893–1965), British businessman, chairman of BP, 1957–1960
- Octavius D. Gass (1824–1924), American prospector and rancher
- Patrick Gass (1771–1870), U.S. Army sergeant, member of the Lewis and Clark Expedition
- Robert Gass (born 1948), American musician, member of the bands Bead Game and the Freedom Express
- Simon Gass (born 1956), British diplomat
- Thomas Gass (born 1963), Swiss scientist and economist, United Nations Assistant Secretary-General for Policy Coordination and Inter-Agency Affairs
- Wilhelm Gass (1813–1889), German theologian
- William H. Gass (1924–2017), American novelist, short story writer, essayist, critic, philosophy professor

== As pseudonym ==
- Bobby Gass, as used by Bobby Tench, British vocalist and guitarist
