= Gas (disambiguation) =

Gas is one of the four main physical states of matter (plural "gases" or "gasses").

Gas, GAS, or gassed may also refer to:

- Intestinal gas
- Gasoline, also known as petrol, engine fuel made from petrochemicals
  - Gas pedal, also known as throttle or accelerator, one of the car controls

== Science ==
=== Biology and healthcare ===
- Streptococcus pyogenes, a bacterium commonly known as Group A Strep, or GAS
- Gas, slang for an anaesthetic
- Growth arrest-specific protein, such as GAS1, GAS2
- Gender-affirming surgery, a surgical procedure, also known as sex reassignment surgery
- General Adaptation Syndrome, a model describing responses to stress
- Global Assessment Scale, later Global Assessment of Functioning, in mental health
- Goal attainment scaling, a method for monitoring client progress in therapy
- Group A streptococcal infection

=== Chemistry, physics, and energy ===
- Fuel gas
  - Coal gas
  - Natural gas
    - Oil and gas
- GaS, chemical formula for gallium(II) sulfide

== People ==
- Gas Lipstick, the drummer for the Finnish rock band HIM

== Arts, entertainment, and media ==
=== Films ===
- Gas (1944 film), a Private Snafu animated short
- Gas (1981 film), a Canadian comedy film
- Gas (2004 film), an American film
- Gas-s-s-s (1971), also called Gas! or It Became Necessary to Destroy the World in Order to Save It, a Roger Corman movie

=== Music ===
- Pseudonym of English electronic musician Mat Jarvis
- Gas (musician), musical project of German producer Wolfgang Voigt
- Gas (Feedtime album), 2017
- G.A.S. Get a Star, 2021 album by Undo K From Hot

=== Television ===
- "Gas" (Bottom), a 1991 episode
- "Gas" (Casualty), a 1986 episode
- Nickelodeon Games and Sports for Kids (Nick Gas), a former TV network

=== Other uses in arts, entertainment, and media ===
- Gas (Hopper), a 1940 painting by Edward Hopper
- Gassed (painting), a 1919 painting by John Singer Sargent
- Gas (comics), a British adult comic
- Cinema Unit Gas, founded in 1988 by Akira Takatsuki
- Gas, a short story by Alfred Hitchcock
- Guilty as Sock!, a 2025 party video game

== Brands and enterprises ==
- Galpin Auto Sports, a US customizing garage
- Gas Jeans, an Italian clothing label

== Computing and technology ==
- Gas (app), a former American anonymous social media app
- Transaction pricing mechanism in Ethereum
- Gear Acquisition Syndrome, compulsive accumulation of technical equipment
- Generalized audit software
- Getaway Special, an experiment bay on the NASA Space Shuttle
- GNU Assembler, gas, a software tool
- Gunner's Auxiliary Sight of the M1 Abrams tank

== Geography ==
- Gas, Eure-et-Loir, France, a commune
- Gas, Kansas, United States, a town

== Sports ==
- Bristol Rovers F.C., England, nickname
- Grêmio Atlético Sampaio, a Brazilian football club

== See also ==
- GA (disambiguation)
- Gass (disambiguation)
- Gassing (disambiguation)
- Category:Gases
