= Gass =

Gass may refer to:

== Music ==
- The Gass, a British rock band formed in 1965 later known simply as Gass

== People ==
- Gass (surname), a list of people with the surname
- Bobby Gass, a pseudonym used by the musician Bobby Tench

== Places ==
- Gass, Maharashtra, a village in Maharashtra, India
- Gass Forest Museum, a natural history museum in Coimbatore, Tamil Nadu, India
- Gass House, a historic home in Guilford Township, Pennsylvania, United States
- Gass Peak, a mountain in Nevada, United States
- Mount Gass, a mountain on the border of Alberta and British Columbia, Canada
- Gass Cemetery, a cemetery in Omaha, Arkansas, United States

== Other ==
- GaaS, short for Games as a Service

== See also ==
- Gas (disambiguation)
