= Nepal–Switzerland relations =

- Nepal: Switzerland

Nepal–Switzerland relations refers to the bilateral relations between Nepal and Switzerland which were established in 1956 as part of Switzerland's broader diplomatic engagement in South Asia. Switzerland opened a consular agency in Kathmandu the same year and established a resident embassy in 2009. Nepal has a United Nations permanent mission in Geneva which includes Switzerland in its jurisdiction. The two countries hold regular political consultations covering topics such as policy, trade, and human rights.

Switzerland's engagement in Nepal began in the early 1950s through initiatives in agriculture, rural development, and vocational training. Bilateral cooperation has since expanded to include trade, as well as cultural and scientific exchanges. As of 2023, the two countries collaborate under the Swiss Cooperation Programme 2023–26, which focuses on federal state building, employment and income, and migration.

== History ==
In 2009, Swissinfo reported that in the years leading up to the opening of its embassy, Switzerland supported Nepal's peacebuilding and democratisation process alongside its longstanding development cooperation. According to Ambassador Thomas Gass, this included advising constitutional working groups, facilitating dialogue on federalism, and helping disadvantaged groups participate in public decision-making. The upgraded diplomatic presence aimed to expand Switzerland's political engagement and strengthen its role in Nepal's peace process.

In June 2018, the Embassy of Nepal to Switzerland, in collaboration with the Non-Resident Nepali Association (NRNA) Switzerland, organized a cultural and promotional event in Bern titled Mountains: Connecting Peoples and Cultures. The event focused on strengthening bilateral ties through trade, tourism, and investment, and highlighted geographic and cultural similarities between the two countries.

== See also ==
- Foreign relations of Nepal
- Foreign relations of Switzerland
