= Health coaching =

Practice of creating health behavior change

Health coaching is a process that uses evidence-based communication and behavioral strategies to support clients or patients in making health-related behavior changes. Health coaches are trained or credentialed professionals who work with individuals managing chronic conditions or those at risk for such conditions.

== Overview ==
Health coaching for clinicians and practitioners is based on evidence-based clinical interventions such as motivational interviewing to facilitate behavior change, the transtheoretical model of change, goal setting, active listening, aggregation and trending of health outcome metrics, and prevention.

The Centers for Disease Control and Prevention define wellness as "the degree to which one feels positive and enthusiastic about life". Wellness coaching is a process that facilitates healthy, sustainable behavior change by challenging a client to develop their inner wisdom, identify their values, and transform their goals into action. Wellness coaching draws on the principles from positive psychology and appreciative inquiry, and the practices of motivational interviewing and goal setting.

Health coaches are not licensed to prescribe diets. In the US Dietitians are the only nutrition professionals regulated by law, and are governed by an ethical code to ensure that they always work to the highest standard. Minimum requirement is a BSc in Dietetics or a related science degree with a postgraduate diploma or higher degree in Dietetics.

In 13 US states, it is illegal to perform individualized nutrition counseling unless licensed or exempt. Effectively only Registered Dietitians are eligible for licensure. However, around the world legislation varies depending upon the country.

== Process ==
The health coaching model follows a process:

=== Establish relationship ===
The process begins with engagement. Engagement and building trust with the client is established by building rapport. Many factors are included in this process. Essential traits to building rapport include genuineness, eye contact, good energy, warmth, good quality of voice, a feeling of connectedness, being comfortable and relaxed in the exchange, mindful listening, being supportive and positive body language, and physical gestures. Rapport is fundamental not only in the initial coaching session but also in each coaching session thereafter. The background of the health coach can also be an asset to their bonding with patients. Allowing health coaches to connect with their patients by building a strong relationship plays a vital role in improving the health outcomes of patients. Especially when working with underrepresented populations, pairing patients with a health coach of similar race/ethnicity, socio-cultural or linguistic background makes the health coach more relatable, and this too impacts the health outcomes of patients. Health coaches may speak a variety of languages in addition to English, which helps to increase the audience of patients that health coaches can support. Speaking more than one language as a health coach is also an asset to the health coach-patient relationship. Having a health coach that is relatable and easy to talk to yields positive outcomes due to the positive relationship between the coach and the patient. Although rapport is important, a coach may want to avoid becoming too close with the client. Becoming too close to a client can create a barrier for successful coaching relationships by being too emotionally attached, having a personal agenda and falling into assumptions based on personal relationships or experience.

=== Motivational interviewing ===
Once a coach has established rapport, building strong communication strategies is essential. An effective tool used in health and wellness coaching and other clinical work is motivational interviewing. Motivational interviewing is a process used in psychotherapy, social work, medicine, addiction and other fields. It aims to raise clients' awareness of problems and possibilities while reducing their ambivalence about change.

Motivational interviewing is also characterized by a focus on the present rather than the past. The emphasis is on the communication that is conducted with clients, concentrating on internal motivating factors and an exploration into individual core values and goals. This allows the client to express their desire to change their lifestyle and identify it themselves rather than having it come from the health coach.

=== Wellness vision ===
A wellness vision is a creative statement by the client that reveals his/her highest potential and can include physical, emotional, social, spiritual and financial realms of their life. A new life vision empowers one to see new possibilities along with a specific and clear direction. It allows a client to activate their imagination and then think, feel, speak and ultimately see the manifestation of their highest potential. A wellness vision is a tool a health coach uses to help the client move to new levels of well-being by connecting the client to their own truth and wisdom that is held within. The wellness vision can also be a creative statement that reveals the client's highest potential and can include physical, emotional, social, spiritual and financial realms of life.

=== Guiding the agenda and goal setting ===
Guiding the agenda and goal setting are collaborative behavior change techniques used between the coach and the client. During the motivational interviewing process, after strengths, values and desires are determined and the client's vision is set in place, specific goals are safely set so the client is able to move in the direction of his/her newly formed desires.

Goals promote behavior change through a collaborative process, which includes the coach making a plan to track and evaluate progress. The coach can help the client focus on success even if a goal is not yet achieved. Evaluating strengths and what is successful helps the client move forward. Positive feedback helps the client progress and move through negative self-talk, ambivalence, resistance, and other hurdles. Although self-regulation is a powerful behavior change tool, the client may lapse. When the coach promotes the principles of positive psychology and goal setting through the motivational interviewing process, the coach helps the client continue to improve self-efficacy, which supports behavior change.

== Intersection with related disciplines ==
There is no evidence that health maintenance organizations (HMOs) are using health coaches for their health care services. However, there is a growing awareness by healthcare practitioners of the role that the health coach plays in establishing sustainable lifestyle changes through behavior modifications, which is essential for chronic diseases management and prevention. In fact, the American Medical Association has launched a STEPS Forward collection of practice improvement strategies, including a health coaching module, which educates physicians on recruiting, training and mentoring health coaches.

=== Social work ===
Social workers are skilled in the field of helping individuals overcome obstacles that inhibit their growth potential. Both coaching and social work fall under the mental health field. Coaching and social work have similar elements. Both practices rely on motivational interviewing. Both are focused on the client being the expert, and both work with the client without judgment, allowing the client to be in control. The essential difference between social work and coaching is that social work is more oriented to the client's relationship to community life and social ethics, whereas coaching is focused on an individual's personal dreams, desires and goals. Aside from patients receiving social work support from various trained social workers, patients may also be connected by their health coach to useful social service programs that may benefit them or that they qualify for.

=== Patient education ===
The traditional approach to patient teaching and education is one that directs information "at" the patient. In essence, the goal is to have the patient do the things prescribed for them. Healthcare professionals have the knowledge about disease processes, exercise guidelines, special diets, and medications that must be imparted to the patient and caregivers in many forms: booklets, pamphlets, audio CDs, and the like.

Many formal health coaching programs are now being offered through institutions of higher learning such as Duke Integrative Medicine, Georgetown University and the Institute for Integrative Nutrition.

== Efficacy ==
Several studies have shown health coaching to be effective in improving various aspects of health. One study on type 2 diabetes concludes that after six months, individuals who were coached showed improvement in medication adherence. Coaching had a positive effect on patients' knowledge, skill, self-efficacy and behavior change while a non-coached control group did not show any improvement. Additionally, coached participants with a hemoglobin A1C over 7% showed significant improvement in A1C.

A study on coronary heart disease indicated that patients in a coaching program achieved a significantly greater change in total cholesterol of 14 mg/dl than the non-coached patients, with a considerable reduction in LDL-C. Those involved in the coaching program showed improvements in secondary outcomes such as weight loss, increased exercise, improved quality of life, less anxiety, and improvement in overall health and mood.

Another study shows that telephonic coaching is an effective program for assisting individuals with self-efficacy and weight loss. Confidence to lose weight increased from a baseline of 60% to 71% at three months, 76% at 6 months and 79% at 12 months. The average body mass index significantly decreased during this interactive coaching study. Average baseline was 32.1, and then documented at 3 months (31.4), 6 months (31.0), and 12 months (30.6).

A study on tobacco cessation concluded that after 12 months, the coached participants had a 32% quit rate compared to 18% for non-participants. Those that participated in the program, who acknowledged that they were ready for change, had the highest rate of quitting at 44%. Additionally, 11% of participants who did not quit reported a reduction in tobacco use. This is considered a positive outcome because other studies have shown that when individuals reduced their tobacco usage, they find increased motivation to quit entirely in the future.

== See also ==
- Goal attainment scaling
- Mindfulness § Therapy programs
- Self-help
- Spirituality § Health and well-being
