= GA =

GA, Ga, or ga may refer to:

== Organisations ==
=== Businesses ===
- Garuda Indonesia (IATA airline code GA)
- General Assembly, a digital and technology training company
- General Atlantic, a private equity company
- General Atomics (formerly GA Technologies Inc.), a U.S. defense contractor
- General Automation, a former computer manufacturer
- Georgia Railroad and Banking Company (AAR mark)
- Greater Anglia, a UK train operating company

=== Other organizations ===
- Gamblers Anonymous, a support group for recovering gamblers
- Gazte Abertzaleak or Young Patriots, the youth organization of Eusko Alkartasuna
- General assembly (disambiguation)
  - United Nations General Assembly, the main deliberative organ of the United Nations
- Geographical Association, a UK organisation dedicated to the teaching of geography
- Geologists' Association, a UK organisation dedicated to the study of geology
- Geoscience Australia, an Australian organisation dedicated to geoscientific research
- Germantown Academy, an independent school in Fort Washington, United States
- Government Arsenal, an agency of the Philippine government under the Department of National Defence

== Linguistics ==
=== Languages and dialects ===
- Ga language
- General American English, an accent of the Midwestern U.S.
- Irish language (ISO 639-1 code "ga")

=== Characters ===
- Ga (Indic), a glyph in the Brahmic family of script
- Ga (Javanese) (ꦒ), a letter in the Javanese script
- Ga (kana), in Japanese

== Places ==
=== Africa ===
- Ga District, Ghana, a former district of southern Ghana
- Gã State, a traditional state in southern Ghana headed by the Gã Mantse
- Ga-Rankuwa, a town in South Africa
- Gabon (ISO 3166-1 alpha-2 code)
- The Gambia (FIPS 10-4 country code)

=== Other places ===
- Goa, in India (ISO 3166-2 country subdivision code GA)
- Georgia (U.S. state) (postal abbreviation GA)

== Science and technology ==
=== Biology and medicine ===
- General anaesthesia, administration of drugs to induce unconsciousness prior to surgery
- Geographic atrophy, an advanced form of age-related macular degeneration
- Gestational age (obstetrics), in pregnancy, the time since onset of last menstrual period
- Embryonic age or gestational age, the length of gestation since fertilization
- Gibberellin, a plant growth hormone
- Tabun (nerve agent) (NATO designation GA)

=== Computing ===
- .ga, the country code top-level domain for Gabon
- General availability, the final stage in the software development lifecycle
- Genetic algorithm, an optimization technique in computer science
- Google Analytics, a web analytics service provided by Google

=== Other uses in science and technology ===
- Gallium (symbol Ga), a chemical element
- General aviation, the category of civil aviation encompassing all non-scheduled aircraft flights
- Geometric algebra, a Clifford algebra used in a geometric context
- Gigaampere (GA), an SI unit of electric current equal to 1,000,000,000 (one billion) amps
- Gigaannum (Ga), a unit of time equal to 1,000,000,000 (one billion) years.
- Globular Amphora culture, an archaeological culture in Europe
- Go Ahead, in a telecommunications device for the deaf
- The additive group scheme, denoted G_{a}

== Sport ==
- Goal attack, a position in netball
- Goals against, a statistic in ice hockey and other sports
- Games ahead, a less common version of the games behind statistic in baseball

== Other uses ==
- GA Geijutsuka Art Design Class, an ongoing 2004 manga series by Satoko Kiyuzuki
- Gandhara or Ga, a basic note of the scale in Indian music, or Svara
- Ga people, an ethnic group of Ghana
- General of the Army, a military rank
- Global affairs, abbreviated GA, alternative term for International relations, the study of politics, economics and law on a global level
- Graduate assistant, a role in academia and in U.S. college sports
