= Ga (Javanese) =

ga
- ꦒ
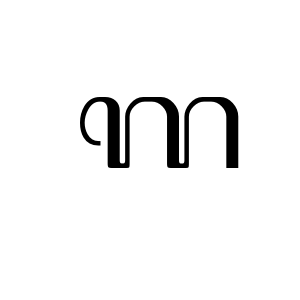
- Aksara nglegena

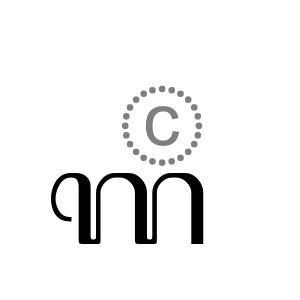
- Aksara pasangan

Usage
- Writing system: Javanese script
- Latin orthography: ga
- Sound values: [g]
- In Unicode: A992

ꦒ is one of the syllables in the Javanese script that represents the sounds /ɡɔ/, /ɡa/. It is transliterated to Latin as "ga", and sometimes in Indonesian orthography as "go". It has another form (pasangan), which is ◌꧀ꦒ, but represented by a single Unicode code point, U+A992.

== Pasangan ==
Its pasangan form ◌꧀ꦒ, is located on the bottom side of the previous syllable. For example, ꦲꦤꦏ꧀ꦒꦗꦃ - anak gajah (little elephant).

== Extended form ==
The letter ꦒ has a murda form, which is ꦓ.

Using cecak telu (ꦒ꦳), the syllable represents /ɣ/.

== Glyphs ==
Nglegena forms				Pasangan forms			
ꦒ ga	ꦒꦃ gah	ꦒꦁ gang	ꦒꦂ gar	◌꧀ꦒ -ga	◌꧀ꦒꦃ -gah	◌꧀ꦒꦁ -gang	◌꧀ꦒꦂ -gar
ꦒꦺ ge	ꦒꦺꦃ geh	ꦒꦺꦁ geng	ꦒꦺꦂ ger	◌꧀ꦒꦺ -ge	◌꧀ꦒꦺꦃ -geh	◌꧀ꦒꦺꦁ -geng	◌꧀ꦒꦺꦂ -ger
ꦒꦼ gê	ꦒꦼꦃ gêh	ꦒꦼꦁ gêng	ꦒꦼꦂ gêr	◌꧀ꦒꦼ -gê	◌꧀ꦒꦼꦃ -gêh	◌꧀ꦒꦼꦁ -gêng	◌꧀ꦒꦼꦂ -gêr
ꦒꦶ gi	ꦒꦶꦃ gih	ꦒꦶꦁ ging	ꦒꦶꦂ gir	◌꧀ꦒꦶ -gi	◌꧀ꦒꦶꦃ -gih	◌꧀ꦒꦶꦁ -ging	◌꧀ꦒꦶꦂ -gir
ꦒꦺꦴ go	ꦒꦺꦴꦃ goh	ꦒꦺꦴꦁ gong	ꦒꦺꦴꦂ gor	◌꧀ꦒꦺꦴ -go	◌꧀ꦒꦺꦴꦃ -goh	◌꧀ꦒꦺꦴꦁ -gong	◌꧀ꦒꦺꦴꦂ -gor
ꦒꦸ gu	ꦒꦸꦃ guh	ꦒꦸꦁ gung	ꦒꦸꦂ gur	◌꧀ꦒꦸ -gu	◌꧀ꦒꦸꦃ -guh	◌꧀ꦒꦸꦁ -gung	◌꧀ꦒꦸꦂ -gur
ꦒꦿ gra	ꦒꦿꦃ grah	ꦒꦿꦁ grang	ꦒꦿꦂ grar	◌꧀ꦒꦿ -gra	◌꧀ꦒꦿꦃ -grah	◌꧀ꦒꦿꦁ -grang	◌꧀ꦒꦿꦂ -grar
ꦒꦿꦺ gre	ꦒꦿꦺꦃ greh	ꦒꦿꦺꦁ greng	ꦒꦿꦺꦂ grer	◌꧀ꦒꦿꦺ -gre	◌꧀ꦒꦿꦺꦃ -greh	◌꧀ꦒꦿꦺꦁ -greng	◌꧀ꦒꦿꦺꦂ -grer
ꦒꦽ grê	ꦒꦽꦃ grêh	ꦒꦽꦁ grêng	ꦒꦽꦂ grêr	◌꧀ꦒꦽ -grê	◌꧀ꦒꦽꦃ -grêh	◌꧀ꦒꦽꦁ -grêng	◌꧀ꦒꦽꦂ -grêr
ꦒꦿꦶ gri	ꦒꦿꦶꦃ grih	ꦒꦿꦶꦁ gring	ꦒꦿꦶꦂ grir	◌꧀ꦒꦿꦶ -gri	◌꧀ꦒꦿꦶꦃ -grih	◌꧀ꦒꦿꦶꦁ -gring	◌꧀ꦒꦿꦶꦂ -grir
ꦒꦿꦺꦴ gro	ꦒꦿꦺꦴꦃ groh	ꦒꦿꦺꦴꦁ grong	ꦒꦿꦺꦴꦂ gror	◌꧀ꦒꦿꦺꦴ -gro	◌꧀ꦒꦿꦺꦴꦃ -groh	◌꧀ꦒꦿꦺꦴꦁ -grong	◌꧀ꦒꦿꦺꦴꦂ -gror
ꦒꦿꦸ gru	ꦒꦿꦸꦃ gruh	ꦒꦿꦸꦁ grung	ꦒꦿꦸꦂ grur	◌꧀ꦒꦿꦸ -gru	◌꧀ꦒꦿꦸꦃ -gruh	◌꧀ꦒꦿꦸꦁ -grung	◌꧀ꦒꦿꦸꦂ -grur
ꦒꦾ gya	ꦒꦾꦃ gyah	ꦒꦾꦁ gyang	ꦒꦾꦂ gyar	◌꧀ꦒꦾ -gya	◌꧀ꦒꦾꦃ -gyah	◌꧀ꦒꦾꦁ -gyang	◌꧀ꦒꦾꦂ -gyar
ꦒꦾꦺ gye	ꦒꦾꦺꦃ gyeh	ꦒꦾꦺꦁ gyeng	ꦒꦾꦺꦂ gyer	◌꧀ꦒꦾꦺ -gye	◌꧀ꦒꦾꦺꦃ -gyeh	◌꧀ꦒꦾꦺꦁ -gyeng	◌꧀ꦒꦾꦺꦂ -gyer
ꦒꦾꦼ gyê	ꦒꦾꦼꦃ gyêh	ꦒꦾꦼꦁ gyêng	ꦒꦾꦼꦂ gyêr	◌꧀ꦒꦾꦼ -gyê	◌꧀ꦒꦾꦼꦃ -gyêh	◌꧀ꦒꦾꦼꦁ -gyêng	◌꧀ꦒꦾꦼꦂ -gyêr
ꦒꦾꦶ gyi	ꦒꦾꦶꦃ gyih	ꦒꦾꦶꦁ gying	ꦒꦾꦶꦂ gyir	◌꧀ꦒꦾꦶ -gyi	◌꧀ꦒꦾꦶꦃ -gyih	◌꧀ꦒꦾꦶꦁ -gying	◌꧀ꦒꦾꦶꦂ -gyir
ꦒꦾꦺꦴ gyo	ꦒꦾꦺꦴꦃ gyoh	ꦒꦾꦺꦴꦁ gyong	ꦒꦾꦺꦴꦂ gyor	◌꧀ꦒꦾꦺꦴ -gyo	◌꧀ꦒꦾꦺꦴꦃ -gyoh	◌꧀ꦒꦾꦺꦴꦁ -gyong	◌꧀ꦒꦾꦺꦴꦂ -gyor
ꦒꦾꦸ gyu	ꦒꦾꦸꦃ gyuh	ꦒꦾꦸꦁ gyung	ꦒꦾꦸꦂ gyur	◌꧀ꦒꦾꦸ -gyu	◌꧀ꦒꦾꦸꦃ -gyuh	◌꧀ꦒꦾꦸꦁ -gyung	◌꧀ꦒꦾꦸꦂ -gyur

Other forms
Nglegena forms				Pasangan forms			
ꦒ꦳ gha	ꦒ꦳ꦃ ghah	ꦒ꦳ꦁ ghang	ꦒ꦳ꦂ ghar	◌꧀ꦒ꦳ -gha	◌꧀ꦒ꦳ꦃ -ghah	◌꧀ꦒ꦳ꦁ -ghang	◌꧀ꦒ꦳ꦂ -ghar
ꦒ꦳ꦺ ghe	ꦒ꦳ꦺꦃ gheh	ꦒ꦳ꦺꦁ gheng	ꦒ꦳ꦺꦂ gher	◌꧀ꦒ꦳ꦺ -ghe	◌꧀ꦒ꦳ꦺꦃ -gheh	◌꧀ꦒ꦳ꦺꦁ -gheng	◌꧀ꦒ꦳ꦺꦂ -gher
ꦒ꦳ꦼ ghê	ꦒ꦳ꦼꦃ ghêh	ꦒ꦳ꦼꦁ ghêng	ꦒ꦳ꦼꦂ ghêr	◌꧀ꦒ꦳ꦼ -ghê	◌꧀ꦒ꦳ꦼꦃ -ghêh	◌꧀ꦒ꦳ꦼꦁ -ghêng	◌꧀ꦒ꦳ꦼꦂ -ghêr
ꦒ꦳ꦶ ghi	ꦒ꦳ꦶꦃ ghih	ꦒ꦳ꦶꦁ ghing	ꦒ꦳ꦶꦂ ghir	◌꧀ꦒ꦳ꦶ -ghi	◌꧀ꦒ꦳ꦶꦃ -ghih	◌꧀ꦒ꦳ꦶꦁ -ghing	◌꧀ꦒ꦳ꦶꦂ -ghir
ꦒ꦳ꦺꦴ gho	ꦒ꦳ꦺꦴꦃ ghoh	ꦒ꦳ꦺꦴꦁ ghong	ꦒ꦳ꦺꦴꦂ ghor	◌꧀ꦒ꦳ꦺꦴ -gho	◌꧀ꦒ꦳ꦺꦴꦃ -ghoh	◌꧀ꦒ꦳ꦺꦴꦁ -ghong	◌꧀ꦒ꦳ꦺꦴꦂ -ghor
ꦒ꦳ꦸ ghu	ꦒ꦳ꦸꦃ ghuh	ꦒ꦳ꦸꦁ ghung	ꦒ꦳ꦸꦂ ghur	◌꧀ꦒ꦳ꦸ -ghu	◌꧀ꦒ꦳ꦸꦃ -ghuh	◌꧀ꦒ꦳ꦸꦁ -ghung	◌꧀ꦒ꦳ꦸꦂ -ghur
ꦒ꦳ꦿ ghra	ꦒ꦳ꦿꦃ ghrah	ꦒ꦳ꦿꦁ ghrang	ꦒ꦳ꦿꦂ ghrar	◌꧀ꦒ꦳ꦿ -ghra	◌꧀ꦒ꦳ꦿꦃ -ghrah	◌꧀ꦒ꦳ꦿꦁ -ghrang	◌꧀ꦒ꦳ꦿꦂ -ghrar
ꦒ꦳ꦿꦺ ghre	ꦒ꦳ꦿꦺꦃ ghreh	ꦒ꦳ꦿꦺꦁ ghreng	ꦒ꦳ꦿꦺꦂ ghrer	◌꧀ꦒ꦳ꦿꦺ -ghre	◌꧀ꦒ꦳ꦿꦺꦃ -ghreh	◌꧀ꦒ꦳ꦿꦺꦁ -ghreng	◌꧀ꦒ꦳ꦿꦺꦂ -ghrer
ꦒ꦳ꦽ ghrê	ꦒ꦳ꦽꦃ ghrêh	ꦒ꦳ꦽꦁ ghrêng	ꦒ꦳ꦽꦂ ghrêr	◌꧀ꦒ꦳ꦽ -ghrê	◌꧀ꦒ꦳ꦽꦃ -ghrêh	◌꧀ꦒ꦳ꦽꦁ -ghrêng	◌꧀ꦒ꦳ꦽꦂ -ghrêr
ꦒ꦳ꦿꦶ ghri	ꦒ꦳ꦿꦶꦃ ghrih	ꦒ꦳ꦿꦶꦁ ghring	ꦒ꦳ꦿꦶꦂ ghrir	◌꧀ꦒ꦳ꦿꦶ -ghri	◌꧀ꦒ꦳ꦿꦶꦃ -ghrih	◌꧀ꦒ꦳ꦿꦶꦁ -ghring	◌꧀ꦒ꦳ꦿꦶꦂ -ghrir
ꦒ꦳ꦿꦺꦴ ghro	ꦒ꦳ꦿꦺꦴꦃ ghroh	ꦒ꦳ꦿꦺꦴꦁ ghrong	ꦒ꦳ꦿꦺꦴꦂ ghror	◌꧀ꦒ꦳ꦿꦺꦴ -ghro	◌꧀ꦒ꦳ꦿꦺꦴꦃ -ghroh	◌꧀ꦒ꦳ꦿꦺꦴꦁ -ghrong	◌꧀ꦒ꦳ꦿꦺꦴꦂ -ghror
ꦒ꦳ꦿꦸ ghru	ꦒ꦳ꦿꦸꦃ ghruh	ꦒ꦳ꦿꦸꦁ ghrung	ꦒ꦳ꦿꦸꦂ ghrur	◌꧀ꦒ꦳ꦿꦸ -ghru	◌꧀ꦒ꦳ꦿꦸꦃ -ghruh	◌꧀ꦒ꦳ꦿꦸꦁ -ghrung	◌꧀ꦒ꦳ꦿꦸꦂ -ghrur
ꦒ꦳ꦾ ghya	ꦒ꦳ꦾꦃ ghyah	ꦒ꦳ꦾꦁ ghyang	ꦒ꦳ꦾꦂ ghyar	◌꧀ꦒ꦳ꦾ -ghya	◌꧀ꦒ꦳ꦾꦃ -ghyah	◌꧀ꦒ꦳ꦾꦁ -ghyang	◌꧀ꦒ꦳ꦾꦂ -ghyar
ꦒ꦳ꦾꦺ ghye	ꦒ꦳ꦾꦺꦃ ghyeh	ꦒ꦳ꦾꦺꦁ ghyeng	ꦒ꦳ꦾꦺꦂ ghyer	◌꧀ꦒ꦳ꦾꦺ -ghye	◌꧀ꦒ꦳ꦾꦺꦃ -ghyeh	◌꧀ꦒ꦳ꦾꦺꦁ -ghyeng	◌꧀ꦒ꦳ꦾꦺꦂ -ghyer
ꦒ꦳ꦾꦼ ghyê	ꦒ꦳ꦾꦼꦃ ghyêh	ꦒ꦳ꦾꦼꦁ ghyêng	ꦒ꦳ꦾꦼꦂ ghyêr	◌꧀ꦒ꦳ꦾꦼ -ghyê	◌꧀ꦒ꦳ꦾꦼꦃ -ghyêh	◌꧀ꦒ꦳ꦾꦼꦁ -ghyêng	◌꧀ꦒ꦳ꦾꦼꦂ -ghyêr
ꦒ꦳ꦾꦶ ghyi	ꦒ꦳ꦾꦶꦃ ghyih	ꦒ꦳ꦾꦶꦁ ghying	ꦒ꦳ꦾꦶꦂ ghyir	◌꧀ꦒ꦳ꦾꦶ -ghyi	◌꧀ꦒ꦳ꦾꦶꦃ -ghyih	◌꧀ꦒ꦳ꦾꦶꦁ -ghying	◌꧀ꦒ꦳ꦾꦶꦂ -ghyir
ꦒ꦳ꦾꦺꦴ ghyo	ꦒ꦳ꦾꦺꦴꦃ ghyoh	ꦒ꦳ꦾꦺꦴꦁ ghyong	ꦒ꦳ꦾꦺꦴꦂ ghyor	◌꧀ꦒ꦳ꦾꦺꦴ -ghyo	◌꧀ꦒ꦳ꦾꦺꦴꦃ -ghyoh	◌꧀ꦒ꦳ꦾꦺꦴꦁ -ghyong	◌꧀ꦒ꦳ꦾꦺꦴꦂ -ghyor
ꦒ꦳ꦾꦸ ghyu	ꦒ꦳ꦾꦸꦃ ghyuh	ꦒ꦳ꦾꦸꦁ ghyung	ꦒ꦳ꦾꦸꦂ ghyur	◌꧀ꦒ꦳ꦾꦸ -ghyu	◌꧀ꦒ꦳ꦾꦸꦃ -ghyuh	◌꧀ꦒ꦳ꦾꦸꦁ -ghyung	◌꧀ꦒ꦳ꦾꦸꦂ -ghyur

== Unicode block ==
Javanese script was added to the Unicode Standard in October, 2009 with the release of version 5.2.

Javanese^{[1]}^{[2]} Official Unicode Consortium code chart (PDF)
	0	1	2	3	4	5	6	7	8	9	A	B	C	D	E	F
U+A98x	ꦀ	ꦁ	ꦂ	ꦃ	ꦄ	ꦅ	ꦆ	ꦇ	ꦈ	ꦉ	ꦊ	ꦋ	ꦌ	ꦍ	ꦎ	ꦏ
U+A99x	ꦐ	ꦑ	ꦒ	ꦓ	ꦔ	ꦕ	ꦖ	ꦗ	ꦘ	ꦙ	ꦚ	ꦛ	ꦜ	ꦝ	ꦞ	ꦟ
U+A9Ax	ꦠ	ꦡ	ꦢ	ꦣ	ꦤ	ꦥ	ꦦ	ꦧ	ꦨ	ꦩ	ꦪ	ꦫ	ꦬ	ꦭ	ꦮ	ꦯ
U+A9Bx	ꦰ	ꦱ	ꦲ	꦳	ꦴ	ꦵ	ꦶ	ꦷ	ꦸ	ꦹ	ꦺ	ꦻ	ꦼ	ꦽ	ꦾ	ꦿ
U+A9Cx	꧀	꧁	꧂	꧃	꧄	꧅	꧆	꧇	꧈	꧉	꧊	꧋	꧌	꧍		ꧏ
U+A9Dx	꧐	꧑	꧒	꧓	꧔	꧕	꧖	꧗	꧘	꧙					꧞	꧟
Notes 1.As of Unicode version 17.0 2.Grey areas indicate non-assigned code points

== See also ==
- Ga (Indic)
