= Linda Gass =

American environmental activist and artist

- Linda Gass with land art installation
- Born: California
- Education: Stanford University
- Known for: Environmental Art

Linda Gass is an American environmental activist and artist known for brightly colored quilted silk landscapes, environmental works, and public art sculptures, which reflect her passion for environmental preservation, water conservation and land use.

== Early life and education ==
Gass was born and raised in California. She attended Brandeis University for two years before transferring to Stanford University, graduating with degrees in Mathematics (BS, '81) and Computer Science (MS, '83). She spent 10 years as a software engineer working for Adobe Inc., before transitioning to her full-time professional artistic career in 1993. Gass has worked with fiber since childhood, having been taught to sew and embroider by her grandmother.

== Career ==
Gass addresses environmental issues through her art, such as the destruction of wetlands, water conservation and resource management, habitat restoration, and the need for more sustainable development. Gass is also involved in Acterra and Green Town Los Altos, local environmental organizations. Her work addresses the challenging environmental impact brought on by development, primarily to areas of California and other western states.

Gass began her artistic career with watercolor painting and then began silk painting. Initially painting silk for art-to-wear clothing, she transitioned to painting wall hangings, which she then began to quilt. Her signature style of quilted landscapes brings awareness via the use of vivid stitching used to recreate maps and aerial photographs. Gass researches the sites through historical photographs and in-person visits. Receiving fellowship awards enabled Linda to explore new artistic approaches and mediums such as glass.

While traditional quilts are typically constructed from fabric pieces, Gass' sculptural stitched quilts are made from a single piece of white silk crepe de chine. This type of silk accepts dye similar to watercolor paper. The subtly reflective white silk canvas is hand painted with silk dyes, layered with high-loft batting, and machine stitched. The batting is sculpted by placement of stitches; the stitches compress the batting, yielding varied areas of elevation and valleys to emulate the desired topography. The stitched lines form an additional layer of design in the overall artwork.

=== Notable works in museums and private collections ===
- International Quilt Museum, Lincoln, NE, After the Gold Rush, museum permanent collection
- Kaiser Redwood City Medical Building, Redwood City, CA, six digital prints for hospital art collection
- UCSF Comprehensive Cancer Center, Bakar Precision Cancer Medical Building, Mission Bay, San Francisco, CA, In Transition, permanent collection
- University of Chicago Medicine, Chicago, IL, 3 artworks, permanent collection
- Kapor Center for Social Impact, Oakland, CA, Land Use Series, permanent collection
- San Jose Museum of Quilts and Textiles, On the Edge II, permanent collection
- Pacific Gas and Electric LEED Certified Building, San Ramon, CA, 3 artworks, permanent collection

=== Notable works in public spaces ===
- 2023 Bascom Avenue Affordable Housing Project, San Jose, CA, glass window design (upcoming installation)
- 2021 City of Los Altos Community Center, Los Altos, CA, 2 mural designs (as part of team)
- 2019 Alameda County Department of Environmental Health, Alameda, CA, 3 artworks to permanent collection
- 2017 East Palo Alto, The Living Shoreline Community Engaged Land Art Installation at Cooley Landing, Palo Alto, CA, Land Art Installation
- 2016 City of Palo Alto, Art in Public Places Collection, Palo Alto, CA, Treatment, print, permanent collection
- 2015 Zuckerberg San Francisco General Hospital and Trauma Center, San Francisco, CA, 3 artworks, permanent collection
- 2013 Alameda County San Lorenzo Library Renovation Project, San Lorenzo, CA, artwork displayed as one of five semi-finalists
- 2012 U.S. Embassy in Moscow, Art in Embassies Program, Moscow, Russia, 9 framed artworks, displayed on loan
- 2011 City of Palo Alto, Art in Public Places Collection, Palo Alto, CA, Wetland Musings, permanent collection
- 2009 City of Lafayette Public Library, Lafayette, CA, On the Edge I, permanent collection

=== Discussion of specific notable works ===
==== Severely Burned: Impact of the Rim Fire on the Tuolumne River Watershed ====
Gass' 2014 artwork, Severely Burned: Impact of the Rim Fire on the Tuolumne River Watershed, was created as a fire map emulating the destruction caused by the 2013 Megafire, which burned over 250 acres (over 400 square miles) of forest near Yosemite National Park. The Rim Fire started 20 miles east of Sonora, California, and at the time was the largest recorded fire in the Sierra Nevada. As of 2022, it remains one of the largest recorded wildfires in California history. Due to weather conditions and drought, the Rim Fire smoldered for over a year before it was declared fully extinguished, profoundly impacting the Tuolumne River Watershed.

The highly textured stitched drawing consists of 12 square, tri-layered, quilted, and stitched textile panels, arranged in a grid pattern, displayed 4 across and 3 down. The overall artwork, which measures 54"x70", is made of silk fabric, quilted cotton batting and colored threads, to visually demonstrate the impact of the fire by replicating the overall fire map, and delineating areas of the burn zone. Blue thread represents the Tuolumne River and its major tributaries, light grey thread stitched as topographic lines indicate the 40% of the severely burned fire area which was reduced to ash, while lightly and moderately burned areas are depicted by black thread. Black thread is also used in a grid pattern on the black silk top layer to indicate the bordering areas outside of the burn zone. The work is included in the Fire Transforms exhibit at the Palo Alto Art Center, whose exhibit features the work of science-minded artists using fire biology and data in their work. An audio recording by Gass describing the work is available on the Center website.

==== After the Gold Rush ====
Gass' first ecological piece, After the Gold Rush is featured on the book cover for Flightpaths: The Lost Journals of Amelia Earhart, in the book Art Quilts Unfolding and was acquired by the International Quilt Museum for their permanent collection. The work was exhibited at the California Heritage Museum in Santa Monica, the San Jose Museum of Quilts & Textiles, and the Kentucky Museum of Art and Craft, in addition to several other museums and galleries.

The brightly colored and geometrically quilted work, created in 1998, was inspired by an aerial view of Interstate 5 crossing the California Aqueduct, which diverts water from Oregon and Northern California to Southern California, and is hand painted on silk crepe de chine, filled with polyester batting and stitched with monofilament and rayon thread. It measures 21"x26.25" and visually recreates the unsustainably irrigated farmland and depleted soil topography of the once desert Central Valley (California), representing development-related problems, water resource management issues, and the human impact on the land. The title of the work is a reference to extractive agricultural practices, regarded by Gass as the second major mining of California lands.

==== San Joaquin Merced Revival ====
Gass' work, [San Joaquin Merced Revival, was part of an art conference exhibition in a series themed "Confluence". Each of the three works in this series consists of a disappearing river confluence paired with an endangered or extinct species as a result of the river's diversions. This work specifically depicts an aerial view of the San Joaquin River and Merced River confluence, where the San Joaquin river appears to be dried up. It is paired with the Chinook Salmon that has now been endangered due to the disappearing river confluence and the diversions of water blocked by the Friant Dam which forced the fish out of their original habitats.

==== Shaped by Water Exhibit ====
In 2011, Gass curated a traveling exhibition, Shaped by Water, centered around the idea of water conservation, appreciation, and educational aspects of the history and the future of water in the San Francisco Bay Area. This exhibition featured many of her silk paintings of aerial views of the water landscape as well as different interactive displays, films, and installation pieces. Gass explained in a short interview with the Bay Nature organization that her objective is to raise awareness on current water issues and portray the beauty of water to motivate people to face the issues.

=== Awards, honors and artist residencies ===
- 2021 Belle Foundation Individual Artist Grant
- 2015 Creative Ecology Art and Science Residency, Palo Alto Art Center and Junior Museum and Zoo
- 2013 Silicon Valley Water Conservation Award, Education Category, for Shaped Water Exhibition
- 2012 Eureka Fellowship, Fleishhacker Foundation
- 2010 Artist Laureate Award, Arts Council Silicon Valley (now Silicon Valley Creates)
- 2007 Artist in Residence, Cubberley Artist Studio Program, City of Palo Alto, CA
- 1999 Rookie Award, Quilt National '99, Dairy Barn Cultural Arts Center, Athens, OH

=== Solo and 2 person exhibitions ===
- 2020 Linda Gass: and then this happened..., Museum of Craft and Design, San Francisco, CA (solo show)
- 2018 Reticulation, Bullseye Projects Gallery, Emeryville, CA (2-artist show)
- 2015 Creative Ecology: Linda Gass-What we Discovered at Cooley Landing, Palo Alto Art Center, Palo Alto, CA (solo show)
- 2014 Bird's Eye View: Aerial Art, Gallery at 48 Natoma, Folsom, CA
- 2010 Worlds, Triton Museum, Santa Clara, CA (2-artist show)
- 2004 No Swimming, Mountain View Center for the Performing Arts, Mountain View, CA (solo show)
- 2002 Transparent Trespasses, The Main Gallery, Redwood City, CA (solo show)

=== Selected invitational exhibits ===
- 2023 Under Water, Palo Alto Art Center, (upcoming installation)
- 2022 Dissolve, Jack & Shanaz Langson Institute & Museum of California Art, UC Irvine, Irvine, CA
- 2022 Fire Transforms, Palo Alto Art Center, Palo Alto, CA
- 2022 35x35, Art Benicia, Benicia, CA
- 2021 Art On the Edge: From Extraction to Restoration and Regeneration, Peninsula Museum of Art, San Bruno, CA
- 2021 Making Waves, Craft in America Center, Los Angeles, CA
- 2021 Sources of Solace, Euphrat Museum of Art, Cupertino, CA
- 2020 FIRE, DVC Art Gallery, Diablo Valley College, Pleasant Hill, CA
- 2019 Fragile Blue Marble, Artik Art & Architecture, San Jose, CA
- 2019 Our Community Prepares, Acts of Nature Then and Now, Los Altos History Museum, Los Altos, CA
- 2018 Art Responds: The Wine Country Fires, 1252 Gallery, Napa, CA
- 2018 The Nature of Stitch, Sheehan Gallery, Whitman College, Walla Walla, WA
- 2018 Waterlines, New Museum Los Gatos, Los Gatos, CA
- 2017 Detritus, Institute of Contemporary Art, San Jose, CA
- 2017 Three Left Coast Artists: Linda Gass, Gyongy Lakey, Linda MacDonald, San Jose Museum of Quilts & Textiles, San Jose, CA
- 2017 Rise Up: Art as Action, Minnesota Street Project, San Francisco, CA
- 2016 The California Art Quilt Revolution, San Jose Museum of Quilts and Textiles, San Jose, CA
- 2016 Demarcate: Territorial Shift in personal and societal mapping, Institute of Contemporary Art, San Jose, CA
- 2014 Above & Below: Stories From our Changing Bay, Oakland Museum, Oakland, CA
- 2013 By Mainly Unexpected Means, Meridian Gallery, San Francisco, CA
- 2012 Art + Life, Gallery Commonweal, Bolinas, CA
- 2012 Delta Waters, LH Horton Jr. Gallery, San Joaquin Delta College, Stockton, CA
- 2011 Reflections on Water, Katherine Nash Gallery, Minneapolis, MN
- 2011 Green: the Color and the Cause, The Textile Museum, Washington, DC
- 2010 Sew New: Contemporary Art Quilts, Osilas Gallery, Concordia College, Bronxville, NY
- 2010 New Shades of Green, Hoffman Gallery of Contemporary Art, Portland, OR
- 2009 Still Water, Dalton Gallery, Agnes Scott College, Atlanta, GA
- 2009 Seeing Green: Visions of a Changing Planet, Visions Art Museum, San Diego, CA
- 2007 Mapping the Territory, Craft Alliance, St. Louis, MO
- 2007 Vanishing Borders: Contemporary Environmental Art, Herndon Gallery, Antioch College, Yellow Springs, OH
- 2006 On Mapping: New Perspectives with a Common Thread, Bellevue Arts Museum, Bellevue, WA
- 2006 Expo Magic Quilt, La Sucrière, Lyon, France
- 2005 Beyond Tradition: Contemporary Art Quilts, Carl Solway Gallery, Cincinnati, OH

=== Selected juried exhibits ===
- 2016 Emerge/Evolve 2016, Bullseye Projects Gallery, Portland, OR
- 2015 Security Question, Hazel Wolf Gallery, Berkeley, CA
- 1999 Quilt National '99, Dairy Barn Arts Center, Athens, OH

=== Curatorial projects ===
- 2011 Shaped by Water: Past, Present & Future, traveling educational and art exhibit: Los Altos History Museum, Los Altos, CA; Los Gatos History Museum, Los Gatos, CA; and History San Jose, San Jose, CA
- 2007 Intimate Apparel, traveling Art Exhibit: Pi Gallery, Kansas City, MO; Textile Center, Minneapolis, MN; University Art Gallery at University of Massachusetts Dartmouth, Dartmouth, MA
