= Gassing =

Gassing can mean:

- Emitting gas
- Gassing (battery), destructive gas generation in batteries
- Gassing (textile process), passing newly spun yarn through a flame to remove the loose fibre ends
- Harming or killing with gas, see Poison gas
- Gassing, prison slang for throwing feces or other bodily fluids at someone
- Talking diffusely or profusely
- Places in Austria
  - Gassing, Frauenstein, Austria
  - Gassing, Sankt Lorenzen im Mürztal
