= Glenn Gass =

American educator (born 1956)

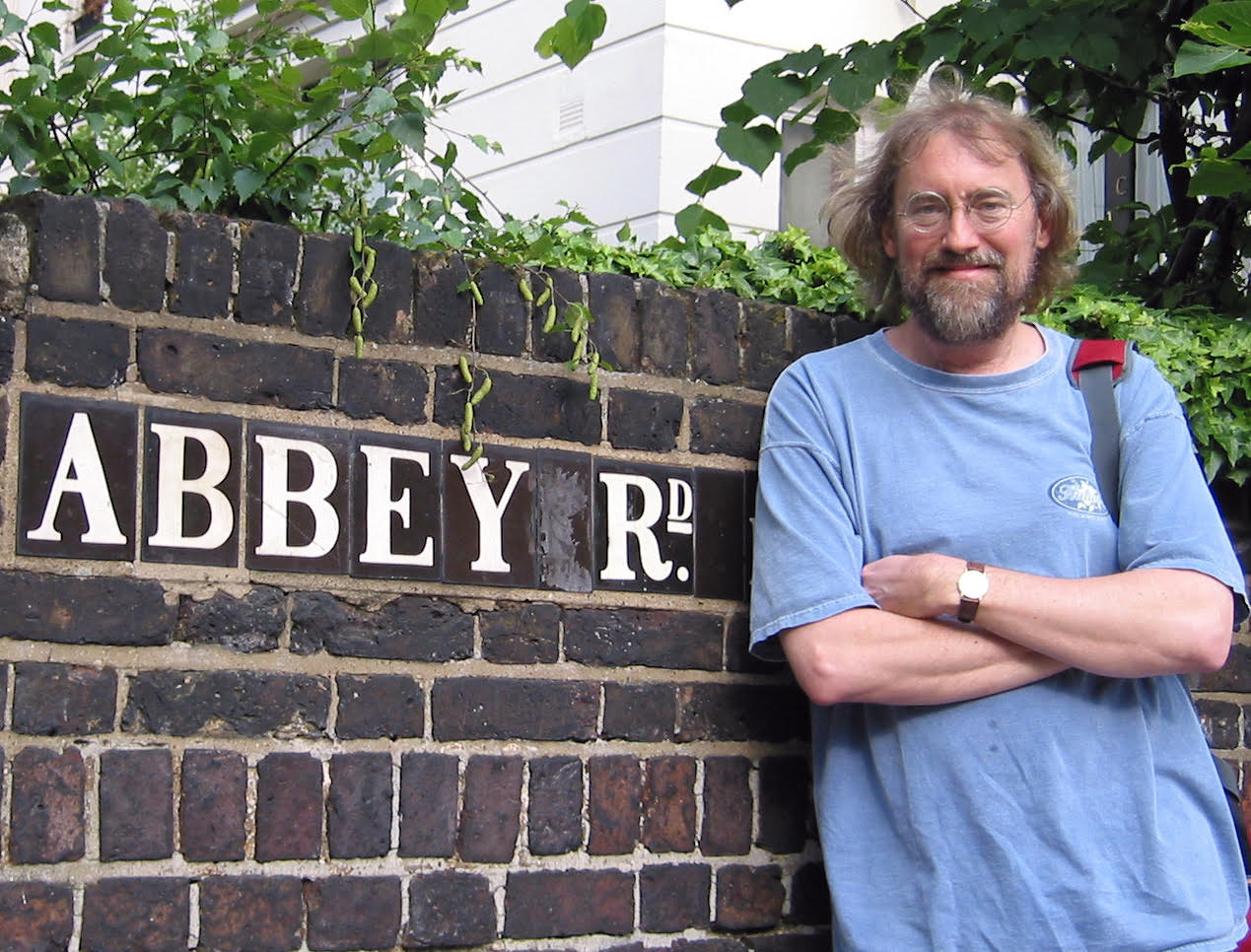
- Gass on Abbey Road, London
- Born: April 8, 1956 (age 70)
- Occupation: Music educator
- Years active: 1980–present
- Known for: Rock music education
- Title: Provost Professor of Music (2011-present); Rudy Professor of Music (2011-present)
- Spouse: Julie Anderson Gass
- Children: 2
- Awards: Herman B. Wells Lifetime Achievement Award; Society of Professional Journalists Brown Derby Award

Academic background
- Education: Phillips Academy; New England Conservatory of Music
- Alma mater: Indiana University M.A., Ph.D. (1985) Music composition

Academic work
- Discipline: Rock 'n' Roll music
- Institutions: Indiana University at Bloomington

Glenn Gass is an American educator who is notable for developing and teaching the first for-credit history of rock and roll music course at a major university. As a professor at Indiana University at Bloomington, he has taught rock history for 40 years and is known as Doctor Rock. During the course of his academic career he taught over 60,000 students, and in addition he has been a music composer. The Bloomington Independent declared him to be the "best professor at Indiana University" for every year from 1993 through 2001, after which the category was renamed "Best Professor At IU Except Glenn Gass". As a youth, Gass was fascinated by The Beatles and studied the violin. He attended Phillips Academy in Andover and became interested in contemporary classical music. He earned a Bachelor of Music degree from the New England Conservatory of Music in 1977. Gass starting teaching rock and roll as a way to pay for his graduate school education. He earned his master's and doctoral degrees from Indiana University. His implementation of college-level courses on rock 'n' roll was described as "unprecedented" in 1982 and spurred a development in universities to adopt similar programs. His courses were often the most popular ones offered at the university, and were well attended. He is the author of the textbook History of Rock Music: The Rock & Roll Era. He has been a highly sought after and frequent guest lecturer at many universities; for instance, he guest lectured at DePauw University on the Beach Boys song "Good Vibrations" as well as the Beatles album Revolver. Sometimes rock stars attended his classes, including John Mellencamp, Lou Reed, Bo Diddley, Neil Young and Booker T. Jones, and he has had long conversations with the Beatles biographer Hunter Davies as well as performers Todd Rundgren and Ringo Starr. His father was the mathematician Clinton Gass and he is married with two children.
