= Gass, Maharashtra =

Village in Maharashtra

Gass is a village in Vasai Taluka, located within the Palghar District of the Maharashtra state of India. In addition to its Hindu residents, it has a Roman Catholic population of about 5000 as of the year 2009. The worship at St. Gonsalo Garcia Catholic Church, which is dedicated to the patron saint of the Roman Catholic Diocese of Vasai, Gonsalo Garcia. It is a natural village with a big lake. It is home to salt farming and is popular for green vegetable farming.

It is known to be a well-educated village with a great GDP.
