= Robert Gass =

American leadership coach (born 1948)

- Citizenship: U.S
- Education: Harvard University
- Occupations: Leadership & Organizational Transformation
- Years active: 1970–present

Robert Gass (born 1948) is a leadership coach and organizational consultant, seminar leader and rock musician. He holds a doctorate in Organizational and Clinical Psychology from Harvard University. He is known for his work in leadership development, organizational transformation, and building social movements. and is a former President of ARC International Consulting, a global consulting and training company specializing in transformational change. He co-founded the Rockwood Art of Leadership trainings which coaches environmental, social justice and human rights leaders across North America, in leadership. He is also co-founder of the Social Transformation Project and a former Board Chair of Greenpeace. Gass has coached leaders and organizations such as the Sierra Club, the NAACP, Amnesty International, MoveOn.org, Service Employees International Union (SEIU) the National Congress of American Indians, 350.org, National Domestic Workers Union, Greenpeace International, and the Obama White House.

He lives in Boulder County, Colorado, with his partner of 50 years, Judith Ansara, and has three children.

== Music ==
As a composer, performer and recording artist, Gass has released twenty two albums of music in various genres including classical, psychedelic rock (as Bob Gass) and sacred chant.

== Discography ==
- Kirtana 2007 (Spring Hill Music)
- Bliss Om Namaha Shivaya: 2005 (Spring Hill Music)
- Awakening 2003 (Spring Hill Music)
- Enchanted 2000
- Chant 1999
- Baptism with Bead Game 1996 (American Sound)
- Ancient Mother 1995
- Medicine Wheel 1994
- Living with Loss (guided meditation & music) 1993
- Songs of Healing 1992
- Opening the Heart (guided meditation & music) 1991
- Heart of Perfect Wisdom 1990
- Pilgrimage 1990
- Gloria 1989
- From the Goddess/O Great Spirit 1988
- Alleulia/Kyrie 1987
- Om Namaha Shivaya 1986
- Trust in Love 1981 (Philo/Spring Hill Music)
- Many Blessings 1980 (Philo/Spring Hill Music)
- On Wings of Song 1976 (Spring Hill Music)
- Freedom Express 1970 (Mercury), credited as Bob Gass
- Welcome with Bead Game 1970 (Avco-Embassy/Fallout)
