= Nabo Gass =

German painter

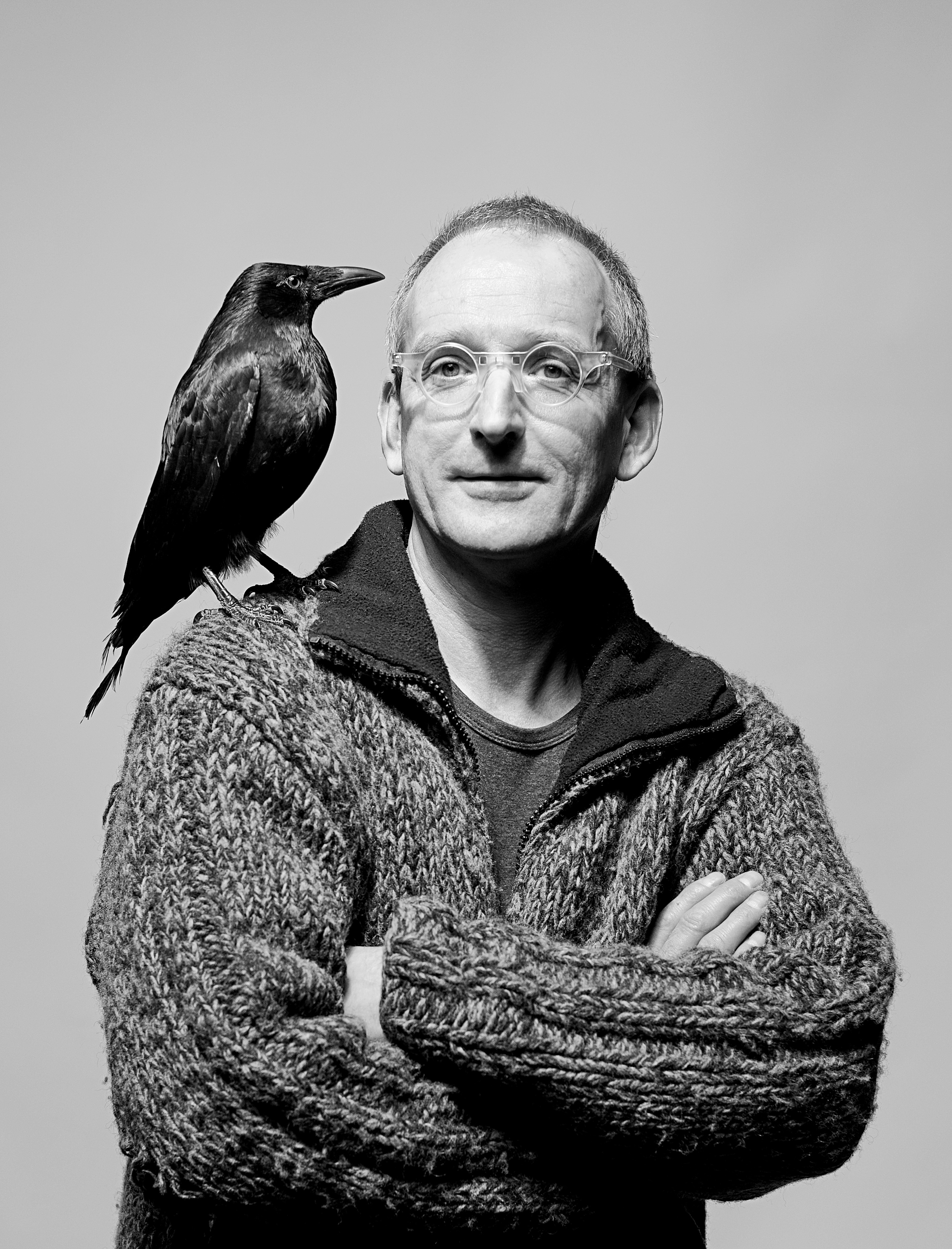
- Nabo Gass Photo: Frank Widman
- Born: August 25, 1954 (age 71); Albstadt Ebingen, Germany
- Known for: Artist

Nabo Gass (25 August 1954 in Ebingen, Germany) is a German painter and glass artist.

== Life ==
In 1973, Gass travelled to Italy. After a classical education as a glass painter, he studied in the 1970s at the Wiesbaden School of Liberal Arts and at the Academy of Arts in Berlin. In the mid 1980s he founded the “Atelier Transparent” in Wiesbaden, where he presently lives and works. Glass has been the focus of his artistic endeavors since 1986.

== Work ==
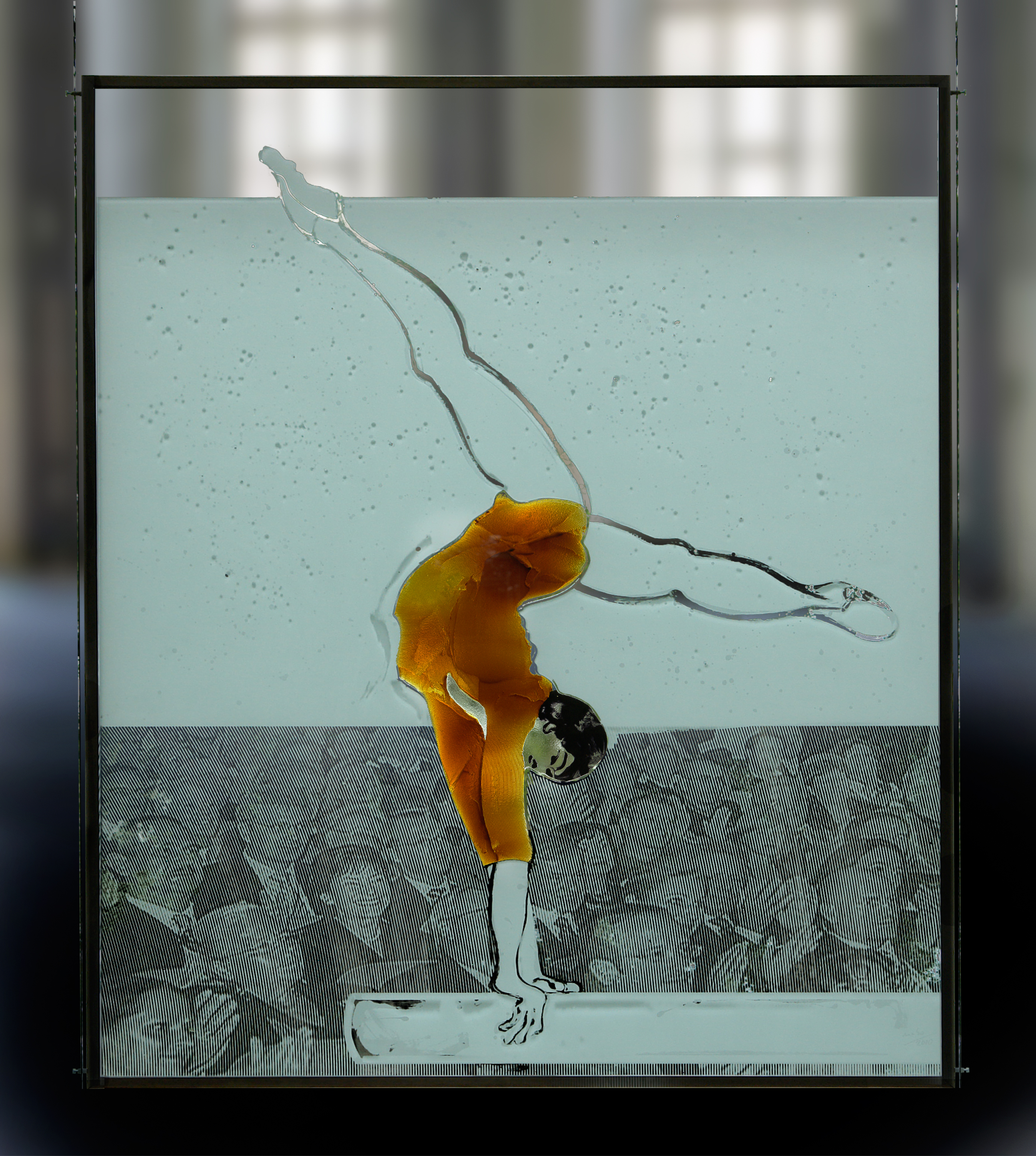
Balance - Nabo Gaß

=== Technique ===
Gass paints with glass – he mixes glue with glass powder into a paste, applies it thickly with a spatula or brush, creating structures with relief, enabling a multilevel construction. In the burning process the colors melt with the support glass but not into one another, so that their composition, color nuances, shading and contrasts are preserved as well as individual brush strokes and spatula distributions. Placing his colorful motifs in the middle of the picture on different levels of the sandblasted support glass is characteristic.

The edges of the composition are predominantly non-treated and transparent, so that the surroundings are projected into the work itself. The transparency of glass allows him to express his thoughts and experiences in a single picture. The pictures are made with two or more panes in back of each other, but connected. Each single pane is distinctly fashioned and the final result of a unique impression. Connecting the panes into a single work makes it possible for Gass to unite his past experiences with the present and to confront them. Not until one views the work as a whole do the overlapping panes blend into an all-round impression, corresponding to a human sense of reality, because a reciprocity exists between the overlapping experienced impressions or sensations.

Gass considers the conventional picture isolated in its own world. The glass picture, on the other hand, is an effort to come to an understanding with its surroundings. His pictures change according to their surroundings and light. Because the background is not entirely composed of the work itself, the composition is pulled into real space, becoming reality itself. This is in keeping with the theme of the artist’s work because they are taken from life, they are immanent.

=== Works in architecture ===
In addition to autonomous glass pictures, Gass has created many interiors with glass doors, luminous ceilings and room dividers.

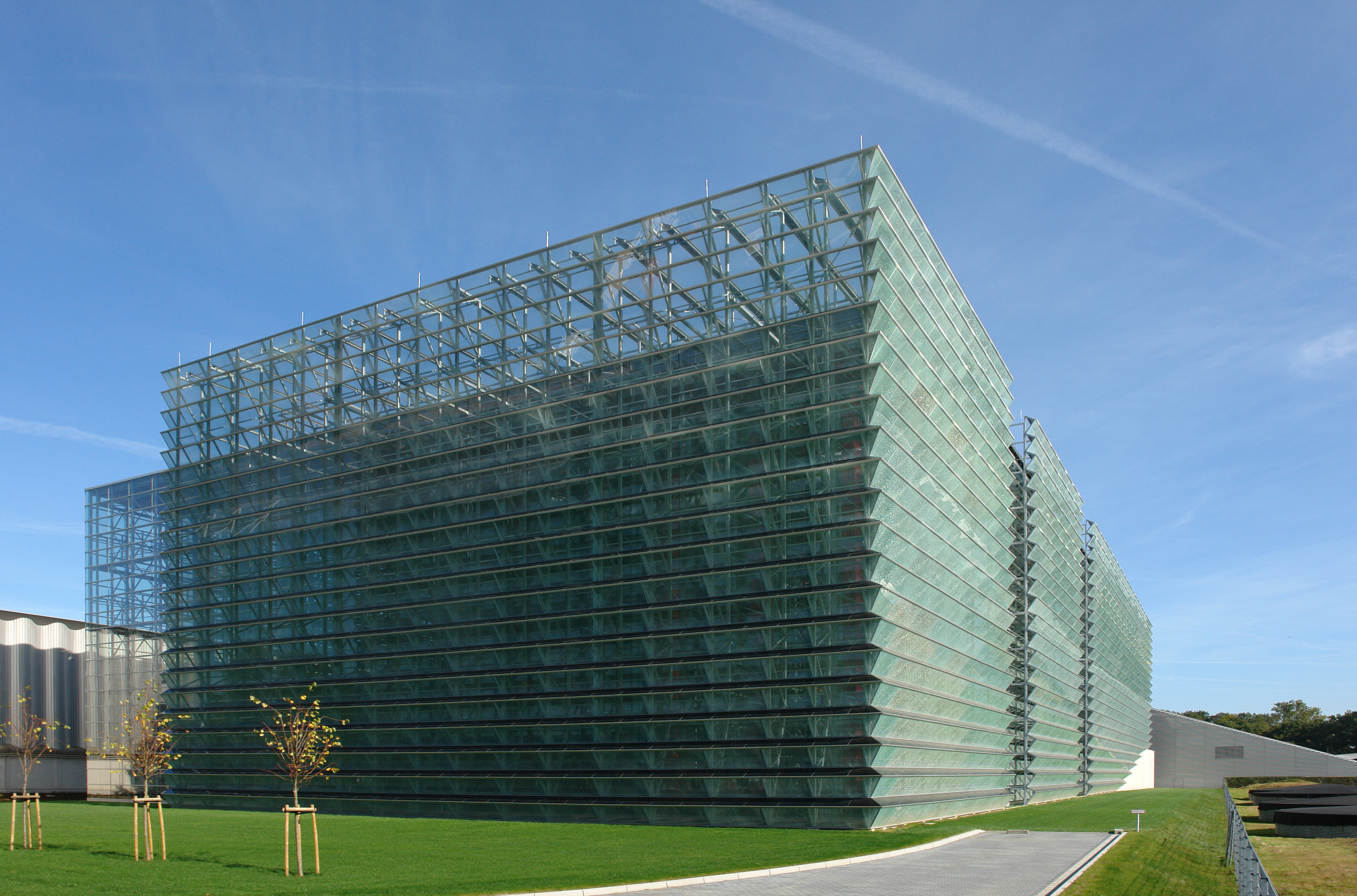
Solar facade by Nabo Gaß

He is also involved in solar technology, and designed the façade of a high bay warehouse in the city of Coeseld, using photovoltaic modules.

The warehouse's folded design of the solar modules extends vertically, bending over the roof and hovering on a framed mounted system above the landscaped roof. The facade is constructed out of deep-black solar modules and greenish-blue sparkling crash glass, two contrasting components generating an electrifying force. The folding effect arises from the installation of the two main elements on the solar facade: alternating, solar modules and crash glass are arranged gradually in a 32° angle of inclination, which guarantees an optimal solar radiation in Coesfeld.

This folded, cascading arrangement of the PV-modules uses the sun’s energy, and provides shade for the glass building behind it. The interior of the warehouse requires no additional cooling. In winter, when the sun is low and the rays are flat, the shading effect is limited and consequently heating is not necessary, so the warehouse can be operated with only an automatic ventilation system. The photovoltaic facade received the architecture award of the Stiftung Deutsche Pfandbriefbank.

His method of fusing a crash glass picture into single pane safety glass without the use of additional adhesives is patented.

=== Works for public places (selection) ===
- high-rise warehouse, Coesfeld, Germany
- Metro GlassTech, New Zealand
- etamRetail Services, The Hague, The Netherlands
- Ernsting Art Collection, Coesfeld, Germany
- Aventis Pharma, Bad-Soden, Germany
- Via Publica and Kurhaus, Wiesbaden, Germany
- Deutsche Pfandbriefbank, Frankfurt, Germany
- Deutsches Museum für Glasmalerei, Linnich, Germany
- DGB, Otto-Brenner-Denkmal, Hannover, Germany

== Critical opinions ==
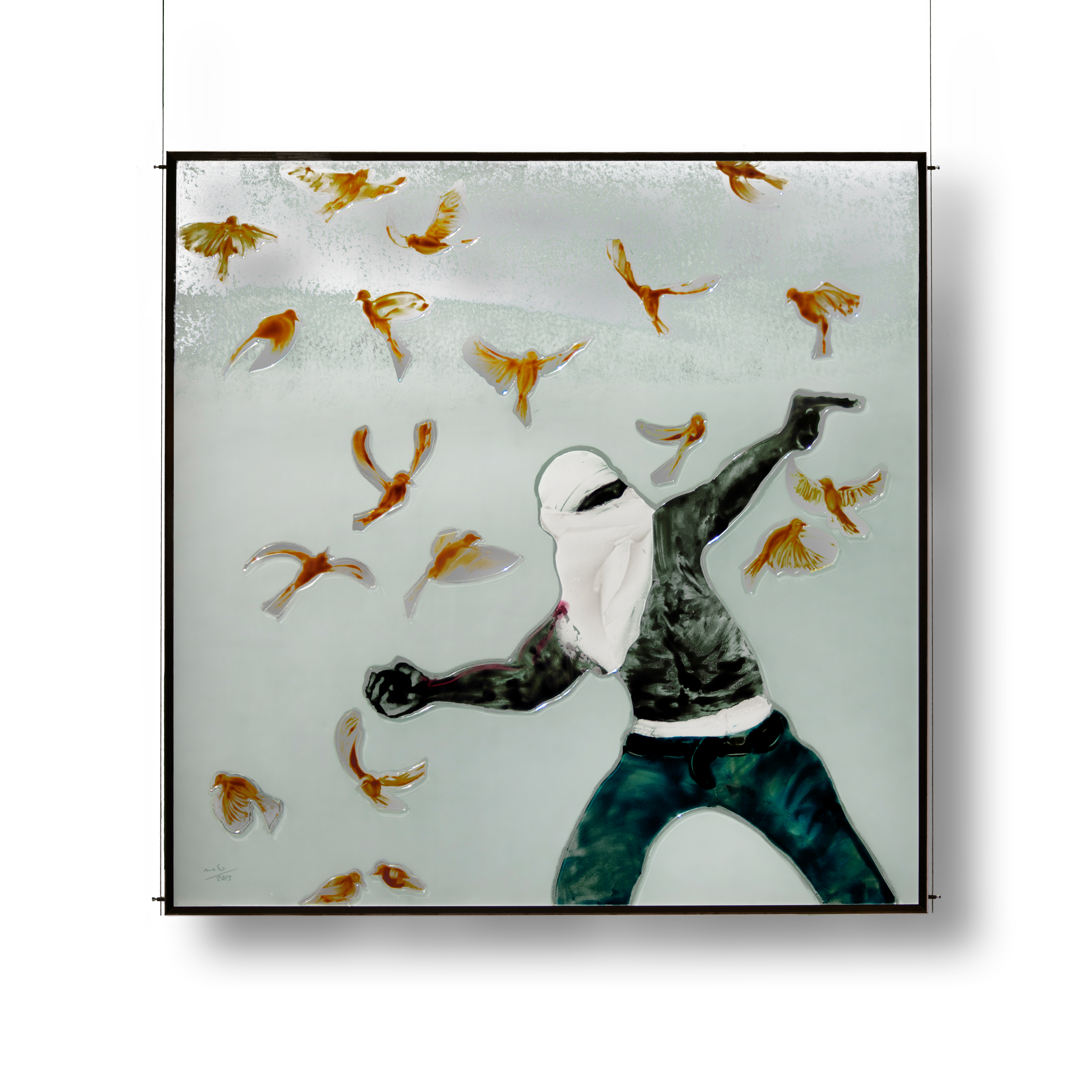
Fly von Nabo Gass (2013)

“The art of Nabo Gass are sophistic parables of being. The comprehensible and enigmatic are cognate to each other by ever changing emphasis and interpretive reversal.” Dorothee Baer-Bogenschütz, journalist and art historian

“The persuasive power of Nabo Gass’ artwork is manifested in the symbiosis of glass and painting. The previous terms of art literature are no longer suitable. What we see in his images is neither painting on glass nor is it painted glass. It is painting with glass. A new quality of art comes to light.” Andreas Greulich, gallery owner and art historian

== Awards (selection) ==
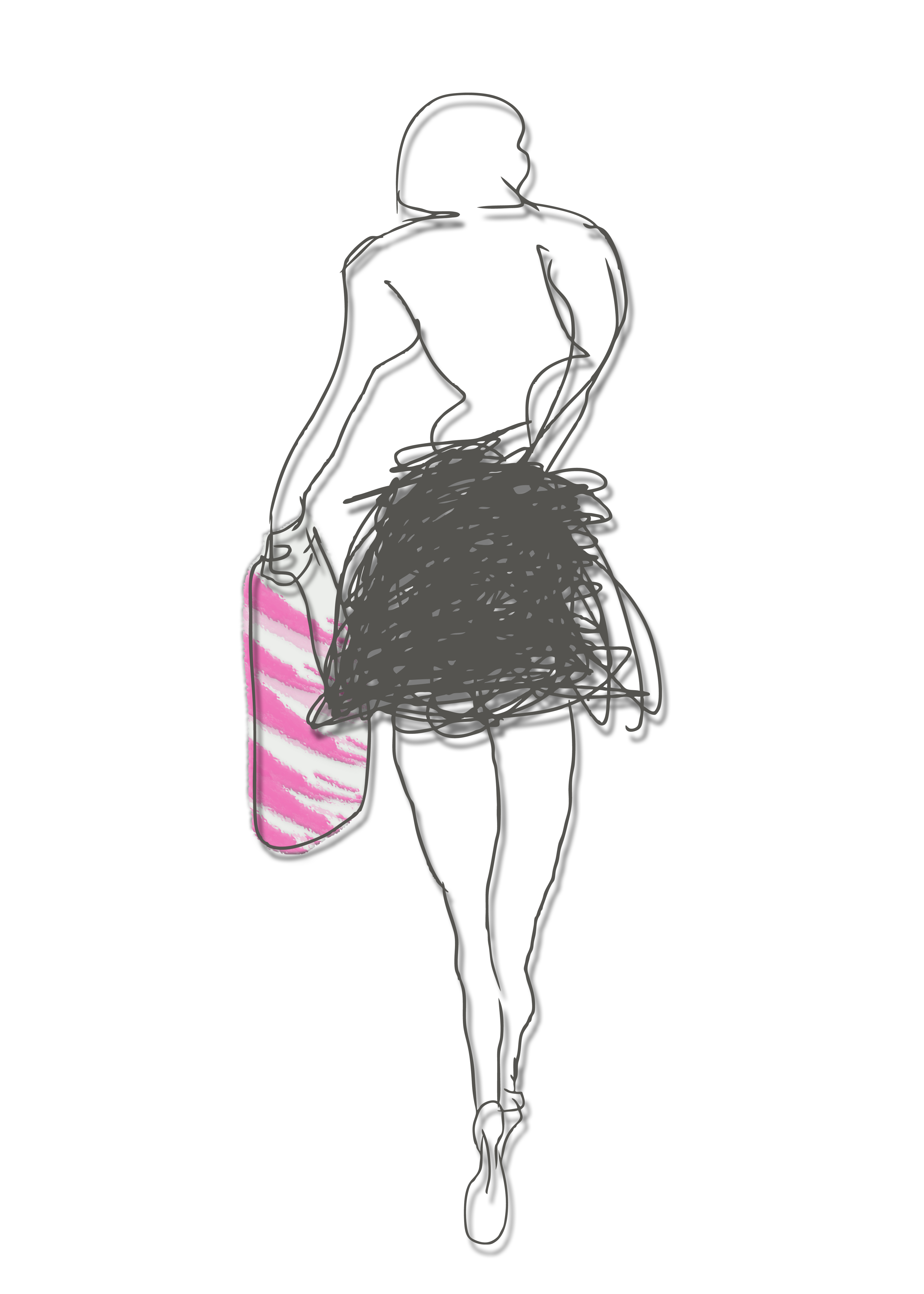
On tour von Nabo Gass / Edelstahl und Glas (2014)

- 2014 Architectural award from BDA Münsterland
- 2012 Architectural award for a solar facade (Stiftung Deutsche Pfandbriefbank), Coesfeld-Letten (Germany)
- 2008 Sculpturcompetition, Mörfelden (Germany)
- 2000 Innovation award, Glastec Düsseldorf (Germany)
- 1999 New Glass Review 21, Corning Museum New York (USA)
- 1983 Art foundation, Bonn (Germany)

== Publications (selection) ==
- 2018 "Meisterwerke der Glaskunst im 20. Jahrhundert", Dr. Iris Nestler, B. Kühnen-Verlag, Band 2, S. 235 ff, ISBN 978-3874483933
- 2015 "Ausgezeichnete Baukunst“, Callwey Verlag, Hrsg. Bundesarchitektenkammer, S. 146 ff, ISBN 978-3-7667-2053-5
- 2014 "Nabo, Spiegelungen", Dorothee Baer-Bogenschütz, Ulrike Hoppe-Oehl, Simone Kraft, Uferatelier Gabi Gass,ISBN 978-3-00-042783-1
- 2005 „Broken Glass“ - Glas in Kunst und Architektur, Wienand-Verlag, 2005, S. 86ff, ISBN 3-87909-875-1
- 2000 „nabo gaß BildErFinder“ Deutsches Glasmalerei-Museum, 2000, ISBN 3-9806045-1-9
- 1986 „Wir machen Druck“, Steidl Verlag, 1986, ISBN 3-7632-8699-3
- 1980 „Künstlerhäuser“ in „Kunst und Öffentlichkeit“, Elefanten Press Berlin, 1980, ISBN 3885200333
