= Ga (Indic) =

Letter "Ga" in Indic scripts

Example glyphs
- Bengali–Assamese: Ga
- Tibetan: Ga
- Thai: ค
- Malayalam: ഗ
- Sinhala: ග
- Ashoka Brahmi: Ga
- Devanagari: Ga

Cognates
- Hebrew: ג
- Greek: Γ
- Latin: C, G, Ɣ
- Cyrillic: Г, Ґ

Properties
- Phonemic representation: /g/ /k/^{B} /kʰ/^{C}
- IAST transliteration: ga Ga
- ISCII code point: B5 (181)
- ^B In Khmer, Tai Viet, Tai Lü, Northern Thai and Tai Khün^C In Thai and Lao

Ga is the third consonant of Indic abugidas. In modern Indic scripts, ga is derived from the early "Ashoka" Brahmi letter, which is probably derived from the Aramaic letter (gimel, /g/) after having gone through the Gupta letter.

== Āryabhaṭa numeration ==
Aryabhata used Devanagari letters for numbers, very similar to the Greek numerals, even after the invention of Indian numerals. The values of the different forms of ग are:

- ग [gə] = 3 (३)
- ग [gi] = 300 (३००)
- गु [gu] = 30,000 (३० ०००)
- गृ [gr̩] = 3,000,000 (३० ०० ०००)
- गॣ [gl̩] = 3×10^{8} (३ × १०^{८})
- गे [geː] = 3×10^{10} (३ × १०^{१०})
- गै [gəi̯] = 3×10^{12} (३ × १०^{१२})
- गो [goː] = 3×10^{14} (३ × १०^{१४})
- गौ [gəu̯] = 3×10^{16} (३ × १०^{१६})

== Historic Ga ==
There are three different general early historic scripts - Brahmi and its variants, Kharoshthi, and Tocharian, the so-called slanting Brahmi. Ga as found in standard Brahmi, was a simple geometric shape, with slight variations toward the Gupta. The Tocharian Ga did not have an alternate Fremdzeichen form. The third form of ga, in Kharoshthi was probably derived from Aramaic separately from the Brahmi letter.

=== Brahmi Ga ===
The Brahmi letter, Ga, is probably derived from the Aramaic Gimel, and is thus related to the modern Latin G and C, and the Greek Gamma. Several identifiable styles of writing the Brahmi Ga can be found, most associated with a specific set of inscriptions from an artifact or diverse records from an historic period. As the earliest and most geometric style of Brahmi, the letters found on the Edicts of Ashoka and other records from around that time are normally the reference form for Brahmi letters, with vowel marks not attested until later forms of Brahmi back-formed to match the geometric writing style.

Brahmi Ga historic forms
Ashoka (3rd-1st c. BCE)	Girnar (~150 BCE)	Kushana (~150-250 CE)	Gujarat (~250 CE)	Gupta (~350 CE)

=== Tocharian Ga ===
The Tocharian letter is derived from the Brahmi, but does not have an alternate Fremdzeichen form.

Tocharian Ga with vowel marks
Ga	Gā	Gi	Gī	Gu	Gū	Gr	Gr̄	Ge	Gai	Go	Gau	Gä

=== Kharoshthi Ga ===
The Kharoshthi letter is generally accepted as being derived from the Aramaic Gimel, and is thus related to G and C, and Gamma, in addition to the Brahmi Ga.

== Devanagari script ==
Ga (ग) is the third consonant of the Devanagari abugida. It ultimately arose from the Brahmi letter, after having gone through the Gupta letter. Letters that derive from it are the Gujarati letter ગ and the Modi letter 𑘐.

=== Devanagari Gga ===
Gga (ॻ) is the character ग with an underbar to represent the voiced velar implosive [ɠ] that occurs in Sindhi. This underbar is distinct from the Devanagari stress sign anudātta. The underbar is fused to the stem of the letter while the anudātta is a stress accent applied to the entire syllable. This underbar used for Sindhi implosives does not exist as a separate character in Unicode. When the ु or ू vowel sign is applied to jja (ॻ), the ु and ू vowel signs are drawn beneath jja. When the उ ( ु) vowel sign or ऊ ( ू) vowel sign is applied to ja with an anudātta (ग॒), the उ ( ु) vowel sign or ऊ ( ू) vowel sign is first placed under ja (ग) and then the anudātta is placed underneath the उ ( ु) vowel sign or ऊ ( ू) vowel sign.

Character Name	उ ( ु) vowel sign	ऊ ( ू) vowel sign
ॻ (Implosive ga)	ॻु	ॻू
ग॒ (Ga with anudātta)	ग॒ु	ग॒ू

An example of a Sindhi word that uses gga (ॻ) is ॻुड़ु (ڳُڙُ), which is of the masculine grammatical gender and means jaggery.

=== Devanagari Ġa ===
Ġa (ग़) is the character ग with a single dot underneath, corresponding with the Urdu (غ). It is used in Hindi words of Persian and Arabic origin to denote the voiced velar fricative [ɣ].

=== Devanagari-using Languages ===
In all languages, ग is pronounced as [gə] or [g] when appropriate. Like all Indic scripts, Devanagari uses vowel marks attached to the base consonant to override the inherent /ə/ vowel:

Devanagari ग with vowel marks
Ga	Gā	Gi	Gī	Gu	Gū	Gr	Gr̄	Gl	Gl̄	Ge	Gai	Go	Gau	G
ग	गा	गि	गी	गु	गू	गृ	गॄ	गॢ	गॣ	गे	गै	गो	गौ	ग्

=== Conjuncts with ग ===
Half form of Ga.

Devanagari exhibits conjunct ligatures, as is common in Indic scripts. In modern Devanagari texts, most conjuncts are formed by reducing the letter shape to fit tightly to the following letter, usually by dropping a character's vertical stem, sometimes referred to as a "half form". Some conjunct clusters are always represented by a true ligature, instead of a shape that can be broken into constituent independent letters. Vertically stacked conjuncts are ubiquitous in older texts, while only a few are still used routinely in modern Devanagari texts. The use of ligatures and vertical conjuncts may vary across languages using the Devanagari script, with Marathi in particular preferring the use of half forms where texts in other languages would show ligatures and vertical stacks.

==== Ligature conjuncts of ग ====
True ligatures are quite rare in Indic scripts. The most common ligated conjuncts in Devanagari are in the form of a slight mutation to fit in context or as a consistent variant form appended to the adjacent characters. Those variants include Na and the Repha and Rakar forms of Ra. Nepali and Marathi texts use the "eyelash" Ra half form for an initial "R" instead of repha.

- Repha र্ (r) + ग (ga) gives the ligature rga: ^{note}

- Eyelash र্ (r) + ग (ga) gives the ligature rga:

- ग্ (g) + rakar र (ra) gives the ligature gra:

- ग্ (g) + र্ (r) + य (ya) gives the ligature grya:

- ग্ (g) + न (na) gives the ligature gna:

- ग্ (g) + न্ (n) + य (ya) gives the ligature gnya:

- द্ (d) + ग (ga) gives the ligature dga:

- द্ (d) + ग্ (g) + rakar र (ra) gives the ligature dgra:

==== Stacked conjuncts of ग ====
Vertically stacked ligatures are the most common conjunct forms found in Devanagari text. Although the constituent characters may need to be stretched and moved slightly in order to stack neatly, stacked conjuncts can be broken down into recognizable base letters, or a letter and an otherwise standard ligature.

- ब্ (b) + ग (ga) gives the ligature bga:

- छ্ (cʰ) + ग (ga) gives the ligature cʰga:

- ड্ (ḍ) + ग (ga) gives the ligature ḍga:

- ढ্ (ḍʱ) + ग (ga) gives the ligature ḍʱga:

- ग্ (g) + ज (ja) gives the ligature gja:

- ग্ (g) + ज্ (j) + ञ (ña) gives the ligature gjña:

- ग্ (g) + ल (la) gives the ligature gla:

- ङ্ (ŋ) + ग (ga) gives the ligature ŋga:

- Repha र্ (r) + ङ্ (ŋ) + ग (ga) gives the ligature rŋga:

- ट্ (ṭ) + ग (ga) gives the ligature ṭga:

- ठ্ (ṭʰ) + ग (ga) gives the ligature ṭʰga:

- व্ (v) + ग (ga) gives the ligature vga:

== Bengali script ==
The Bengali script গ is derived from Siddhaṃ, and is marked by the lack of horizontal head line, and less geometric shape than its Devanagari counterpart, ग. The inherent vowel of Bengali consonant letters is /ɔ/, so the bare letter গ will sometimes be transliterated as "go" instead of "ga". Adding okar, the "o" vowel mark, gives a reading of /go/. Like all Indic consonants, গ can be modified by marks to indicate another (or no) vowel than its inherent "a".

Bengali গ with vowel marks
ga	gā	gi	gī	gu	gū	gr	gr̄	ge	gai	go	gau	g
গ	গা	গি	গী	গু	গূ	গৃ	গৄ	গে	গৈ	গো	গৌ	গ্

=== গ in Bengali-using languages ===
গ is used as a basic consonant character in all of the major Bengali script orthographies, including Bengali and Assamese.

=== Conjuncts with গ ===
Bengali গ exhibits conjunct ligatures, as is common in Indic scripts, with a tendency towards stacked ligatures.

- দ্ (d) + গ (ga) gives the ligature dga:

- গ্ (g) + ধ (dʱa) gives the ligature gdʱa:

- গ্ (g) + ধ্ (dʱ) + র (ra) gives the ligature gdʱra, with the ra phala suffix:

- গ্ (g) + ধ্ (dʱ) + য (ya) gives the ligature gdʱya, with the ya phala suffix:

- গ্ (g) + ল (la) gives the ligature gla:

- গ্ (g) + ম (ma) gives the ligature gma:

- গ্ (g) + ন (na) gives the ligature gna:

- গ্ (g) + ণ (ṇa) gives the ligature gṇa:

- গ্ (g) + ন্ (n) + য (ya) gives the ligature gnya, with the ya phala suffix:

- গ্ (g) + র (ra) gives the ligature gra, with the ra phala suffix:

- গ্ (g) + র্ (r) + য (ya) gives the ligature grya, with the ra phala and ya phala suffixes

- গ্ (g) + ব (va) gives the ligature gva, with the va phala suffix:

- গ্ (g) + য (ya) gives the ligature gya, with the ya phala suffix:

- ল্ (l) + গ (ga) gives the ligature lga:

- ঙ্ (ŋ) + গ (ga) gives the ligature ŋga:

- ঙ্ (ŋ) + গ্ (g) + য (ya) gives the ligature ŋgya, with the ya phala suffix:

- র্ (r) + গ (ga) gives the ligature rga, with the repha prefix:

- র্ (r) + গ্ (g) + য (ya) gives the ligature rgya, with repha and ya phala affixes:

== Gurmukhi script ==
Gagaa [gəgːɑ] (ਗ) is the eighth letter of the Gurmukhi alphabet. Its name is [gəgːɑ] and is pronounced as /g/ when used in words. It is derived from the Laṇḍā letter ga, and ultimately from Brahmi ga. Gurmukhi gagaa does not have a special pairin or addha (reduced) form for making conjuncts, and in modern Punjabi texts do not take a half form or halant to indicate the bare consonant /g/, although Gurmukhi Sanskrit texts may use an explicit halant.

== Gujarati Ga ==
Gujarati Ga.

Ga (ગ) is the third consonant of the Gujarati abugida. It is derived from Devanagari Ga, and ultimately the Brahmi letter.

=== Gujarati-using Languages ===
The Gujarati script is used to write the Gujarati and Kutchi languages. In both languages, ગ is pronounced as [gə] or [g] when appropriate. Like all Indic scripts, Gujarati uses vowel marks attached to the base consonant to override the inherent /ə/ vowel:

Ga	Gā	Gi	Gī	Gu	Gū	Gr	Gl	Gr̄	Gl̄	Gĕ	Ge	Gai	Gŏ	Go	Gau	G
Gujarati Ga syllables, with vowel marks in red.

=== Conjuncts with ગ ===
Half form of Ga.

Gujarati ગ exhibits conjunct ligatures, much like its parent Devanagari Script. Most Gujarati conjuncts can only be formed by reducing the letter shape to fit tightly to the following letter, usually by dropping a character's vertical stem, sometimes referred to as a "half form". A few conjunct clusters can be represented by a true ligature, instead of a shape that can be broken into constituent independent letters, and vertically stacked conjuncts can also be found in Gujarati, although much less commonly than in Devanagari. True ligatures are quite rare in Indic scripts. The most common ligated conjuncts in Gujarati are in the form of a slight mutation to fit in context or as a consistent variant form appended to the adjacent characters. Those variants include Na and the Repha and Rakar forms of Ra.

- ર્ (r) + ગ (ga) gives the ligature RGa:

- ગ્ (g) + ર (ra) gives the ligature GRa:

- ગ્ (g) + ન (na) gives the ligature GNa:

- દ્ (d) + ગ (ga) gives the ligature DGa:

== Telugu Ga ==
Telugu independent and subjoined Ga.

Ga (గ) is a consonant of the Telugu abugida. It ultimately arose from the Brahmi letter. It is closely related to the Kannada letter ಗ. Most Telugu consonants contain a v-shaped headstroke that is related to the horizontal headline found in other Indic scripts, although headstrokes do not connect adjacent letters in Telugu. The headstroke is normally lost when adding vowel matras. Telugu conjuncts are created by reducing trailing letters to a subjoined form that appears below the initial consonant of the conjunct. Many subjoined forms are created by dropping their headline, with many extending the end of the stroke of the main letter body to form an extended tail reaching up to the right of the preceding consonant. This subjoining of trailing letters to create conjuncts is in contrast to the leading half forms of Devanagari and Bengali letters. Ligature conjuncts are not a feature in Telugu, with the only non-standard construction being an alternate subjoined form of Ṣa (borrowed from Kannada) in the KṢa conjunct.

== Malayalam Ga ==
Malayalam letter Ga

Ga (ഗ) is a consonant of the Malayalam abugida. It ultimately arose from the Brahmi letter, via the Grantha letter Ga. Like in other Indic scripts, Malayalam consonants have the inherent vowel "a", and take one of several modifying vowel signs to represent syllables with another vowel or no vowel at all.

Malayalam Ga matras: Ga, Gā, Gi, Gī, Gu, Gū, Gr̥, Gr̥̄, Gl̥, Gl̥̄, Ge, Gē, Gai, Go, Gō, Gau, and G.

=== Conjuncts of ഗ ===
As is common in Indic scripts, Malayalam joins letters together to form conjunct consonant clusters. There are several ways in which conjuncts are formed in Malayalam texts: using a post-base form of a trailing consonant placed under the initial consonant of a conjunct, a combined ligature of two or more consonants joined together, a conjoining form that appears as a combining mark on the rest of the conjunct, the use of an explicit candrakkala mark to suppress the inherent "a" vowel, or a special consonant form called a "chillu" letter, representing a bare consonant without the inherent "a" vowel. Texts written with the modern reformed Malayalam orthography, put̪iya lipi, may favor more regular conjunct forms than older texts in paḻaya lipi, due to changes undertaken in the 1970s by the Government of Kerala.

- ഗ് (g) + ഗ (ga) gives the ligature gga:

- ഗ് (g) + ഘ (ɡʱa) gives the ligature gɡʱa:

- ഗ് (g) + ദ (da) gives the ligature gda:

- ഗ് (g) + ന (na) gives the ligature gna:

- ഗ് (g) + മ (ma) gives the ligature gma:

- ഗ് (g) + ര (ra) gives the ligature gra:

== Thai script ==
Kho khwai (ค) and kho khon (ฅ) are the fourth and fifth letters of the Thai script. They fall under the low class of Thai consonants. In IPA, kho khwai and kho khon are pronounced as [kʰ] at the beginning of a syllable and are pronounced as [k̚] at the end of a syllable. The previous two letters of the alphabet, kho khai (ข) and kho khuat (ฃ), are also named kho, however, they all fall under the high class of Thai consonants. The next letter of the alphabet, kho ra-khang (ฆ), correspond to the Sanskrit letter ‘घ’. Unlike many Indic scripts, Thai consonants do not form conjunct ligatures, and use the pinthu—an explicit virama with a dot shape—to indicate bare consonants.

=== Kho Khwai ===
In the acrophony of the Thai script, khwai (ควาย) means ‘water buffalo’. Kho khwai corresponds to the Sanskrit character ‘ग’.

=== Kho Khon ===
In the acrophony of the Thai script, khon (คน) means ‘person’. Kho khon (ฅ) represents the voiced velar fricative sound /ɣ/ that existed in Old Thai at the time the alphabet was created but no longer exists in Modern Thai. When the Thai script was developed, the voiceless velar fricative sound did not have a Sanskrit or Pali counterpart so the character kho khwai was slightly modified to create kho khon. During the Old Thai period, this sounds merged into the stop /ɡ/, and as a result the use of this letters became unstable. Although kho khon is now obsolete, it remains in dictionaries, preserving the traditional count of 44 letters in the Thai alphabet. When the first Thai typewriter was developed by Edwin Hunter McFarland in 1892, there was simply no space for all characters, thus kho khon was one of the two letters left out along with kho khuat. Although kho khon does not appear in modern Thai orthography, some writers and publishers are trying to reintroduce its usage.

== Canadian Aboriginal Syllabics Ke ==
ᑫ, ᑭ, ᑯ and ᑲ are the base characters "Ke", "Ki", "Ko" and "Ka" in the Canadian Aboriginal Syllabics. The bare consonant ᒃ (K) is a small version of the A-series letter ᑲ, although the Western Cree letter ᐠ, derived from Pitman shorthand was the original bare consonant symbol for K. The character ᑫ is derived from a handwritten form of the Devanagari letter ग, without the headline or vertical stem, and the forms for different vowels are derived by mirroring. Unlike most writing systems without legacy computer encodings, complex Canadian syllabic letters are represented in Unicode with pre-composed characters, rather than with base characters and diacritical marks.

Variant	E-series		I-series		O-series		A-series			Other
K + vowel	ᑫ		ᑭ		ᑯ		ᑲ			ᢸ
K + vowel	Ke		Ki		Ko		Ka			Kay
Small	-		ᣖ		ᒄ		ᒃ			ᐠ
Small	-		Ojibway K		Kw		K			Cree K
K with long vowels	-		ᑮ		ᑰ	ᑱ	ᑳ			ᑬ
K with long vowels	-		Kī		Kō	Cree Kō	Kā			Kāi
K+ W- vowels	ᑴ	ᑵ	ᑶ	ᑷ	ᑺ	ᑻ	ᑾ		ᑿ	ᢹ
K+ W- vowels	Kwe	Cree Kwe	Kwi	Cree Kwi	Kwo	Cree Kwo	Kwa		Cree Kwa	Kway
K+ W- long vowels	-		ᑸ	ᑹ	ᑼ	ᑽ	ᒀ	ᒂ	ᒁ	-
K+ W- long vowels	-		Kwī	Cree Kwī	Kwō	Cree Kwō	Kwā	Naskapi Kwā	Cree Kwā	-
Q	-		ᕿ		ᖁ		ᖃ			ᖅ
Q	-		Qi		Qo		Qa			Q
Q with long vowels	-		ᖀ		ᖂ		ᖄ			ᕾ
Q with long vowels	-		Qī		Qō		Qā			Qāi
Slavey K forms	ᒅ		ᒆ		ᒇ		ᒈ			-
Slavey K forms	Ke		Ki		Ko		Ka			

== Odia Ga ==
Odia independent and subjoined letter Ga.

Ga (ଗ) is a consonant of the Odia abugida. It ultimately arose from the Brahmi letter, via the Siddhaṃ letter Ga. Like in other Indic scripts, Odia consonants have the inherent vowel "a", and take one of several modifying vowel signs to represent syllables with another vowel or no vowel at all.

Odia Ga with vowel matras
Ga	Gā	Gi	Gī	Gu	Gū	Gr̥	Gr̥̄	Gl̥	Gl̥̄	Ge	Gai	Go	Gau	G
ଗ	ଗା	ଗି	ଗୀ	ଗୁ	ଗୂ	ଗୃ	ଗୄ	ଗୢ	ଗୣ	ଗେ	ଗୈ	ଗୋ	ଗୌ	ଗ୍

=== Conjuncts of ଗ ===
As is common in Indic scripts, Odia joins letters together to form conjunct consonant clusters. The most common conjunct formation is achieved by using a small subjoined form of trailing consonants. Most consonants' subjoined forms are identical to the full form, just reduced in size, although a few drop the curved headline or have a subjoined form not directly related to the full form of the consonant. The second type of conjunct formation is through pure ligatures, where the constituent consonants are written together in a single graphic form. This ligature may be recognizable as being a combination of two characters or it can have a conjunct ligature unrelated to its constituent characters.

- ଙ୍ (ŋ) + ଗ (ga) gives the ligature ŋga:

- ର୍ (r) + ଗ (ga) gives the ligature rga:

- ଗ୍ (g) + ର (ra) gives the ligature gra:

== Kaithi Ga ==
Kaithi consonant and half-form Ga.

Ga (𑂏) is a consonant of the Kaithi abugida. It ultimately arose from the Brahmi letter, via the Siddhaṃ letter Ga. Like in other Indic scripts, Kaithi consonants have the inherent vowel "a", and take one of several modifying vowel signs to represent syllables with another vowel or no vowel at all.

Kaithi Ga with vowel matras
Ga	Gā	Gi	Gī	Gu	Gū	Ge	Gai	Go	Gau	G
𑂏	𑂏𑂰	𑂏𑂱	𑂏𑂲	𑂏𑂳	𑂏𑂴	𑂏𑂵	𑂏𑂶	𑂏𑂷	𑂏𑂸	𑂏𑂹

=== Conjuncts of 𑂏 ===
As is common in Indic scripts, Kaithi joins letters together to form conjunct consonant clusters. The most common conjunct formation is achieved by using a half form of preceding consonants, although several consonants use an explicit virama. Most half forms are derived from the full form by removing the vertical stem. As is common in most Indic scripts, conjuncts of ra are indicated with a repha or rakar mark attached to the rest of the consonant cluster. In addition, there are a few vertical conjuncts that can be found in Kaithi writing, but true ligatures are not used in the modern Kaithi script.

- 𑂏୍ (g) + 𑂩 (ra) gives the ligature gra:

- 𑂩୍ (r) + 𑂏 (ga) gives the ligature rga:

== Tirhuta Ga ==
Tirhuta consonant Ga

Ga (𑒑) is a consonant of the Tirhuta abugida. It ultimately arose from the Brahmi letter, via the Siddhaṃ letter Ga. Like in other Indic scripts, Tirhuta consonants have the inherent vowel "a", and take one of several modifying vowel signs to represent sylables with another vowel or no vowel at all.

Tirhuta Ga with vowel matras
Ga	Gā	Gi	Gī	Gu	Gū	Gṛ	Gṝ	Gḷ	Gḹ	Gē	Ge	Gai	Gō	Go	Gau	G
𑒑	𑒑𑒰	𑒑𑒱	𑒑𑒲	𑒑𑒳	𑒑𑒴	𑒑𑒵	𑒑𑒶	𑒑𑒷	𑒑𑒸	𑒑𑒹	𑒑𑒺	𑒑𑒻	𑒑𑒼	𑒑𑒽	𑒑𑒾	𑒑𑓂

=== Conjuncts of 𑒑 ===
As is common in Indic scripts, Tirhuta joins letters together to form conjunct consonant clusters. The most common conjunct formation is achieved by using an explicit virama. As is common in most Indic scripts, conjuncts of ra are indicated with a repha or rakar mark attached to the rest of the consonant cluster. In addition, other consonants take unique combining forms when in conjunct with other letters, and there are several vertical conjuncts and true ligatures that can be found in Tirhuta writing.

- 𑒑୍ (g) + 𑒡 (dʱa) gives the ligature gdʱa:

- 𑒑୍ (g) + 𑒑 (ga) gives the ligature gga:

- 𑒑୍ (g) + 𑒢 (na) gives the ligature gna:

- 𑒑୍ (g) + 𑒩 (ra) gives the ligature gra:

- 𑒑 (g) + 𑒅 (u) gives the ligature gu:

- 𑒑୍ (g) + 𑒫 (va) gives the ligature gva:

- 𑒓୍ (ŋ) + 𑒑 (ga) gives the ligature ŋga:

- 𑒩୍ (r) + 𑒑 (ga) gives the ligature rga:

- 𑒞୍ (t) + 𑒑 (ga) gives the ligature tga:

== Khmer Ko ==
គ	្គ
Independent	Subscript
Khmer independent and subjoined letter Ko.

Ko (គ) is a consonant of the Khmer abugida. It ultimately arose from the Brahmi letter, via the Pallava letter Ga. Like in other Indic scripts, Khmer consonants have the inherent vowel "a", and take one of several modifying vowel signs to represent syllables with another vowel. Actually, the sounds of the vowels are modified by the consonant; see the article on the Khmer writing system for details.

Khmer Ko with vowel matras
Ga	Gā	Gi	Gī	Gu	Gū	Gr̥	Gr̥̄	Gl̥	Gl̥̄	Ge	Gai	Go	Gau	Gẏ	Gȳ	Gua	Goe	Gẏa	Gia	Gae	Gà	G
គ	គា	គិ	គី	គុ	គូ	គ្ឫ	គ្ឬ	គ្ឭ	គ្ឮ	គេ	គៃ	គោ	គៅ	គឹ	គឺ	គួ	គើ	គឿ	គៀ	គែ	គៈ	គ៑

Note: The vowels (other than vocalic liquids) are shown using the ALA-LC scheme.

Pali and Sanskrit are written as abugidas with the lack of a vowel between consonants notated as consonants indicated by vertically stacking the consonants without their touching. For phonetically final consonants, the lack of a vowel is marked by virama.

The Khmer language works the same, except that a different method is used for the last consonant of a word. The final consonant in a consonant stack is indicated as having no implicit vowel by applying tôndôkhéad to it. By default, a consonant surmounted by robat is silent and lacks an inherent vowel. The yŭkôlpĭntŭ positively indicates the presence of a final implicit vowel, plus its automatic glottal stop. Otherwise, there is no final vowel, unless the word is of Pali or Sanskrit origin, in which case the spelling is ambiguous. Up until the start of the 20th century, the lack of a final vowel could be indicating by subscripting the consonant, as then done in Lao and in other non-Indic languages using the Tai Tham script.

== Tai Tham Script ==
Tai Tham independent (ᨣ), subjoined (◌᩠ᨣ) and modified letter Low Ka (ᨤ).

Low Ka (ᨣ) is a consonant of the Tai Tham abugida. It ultimately arose from the Brahmi letter, via the Pallava letter Ga. The Tai Tham script was originally used to write Pali (the name 'Tham' is a local form of dharma), and faced the same limitations in writing Tai languages as Khmer had. The Thai solutions were adopted, with consonants being systematically modified by the addition of a tail to supply new consonants, mostly for fricatives. Low Ka was modified, yielding what for convenience we call Low Khha here. Both consonants are low consonants in the Tai alphabets. The two sounds, /ɡ/ and /ɣ/, subsequently merɡed in Lao as /kʰ/, and Low Khha is absent from the Lao variant of Tai Tham. The other Tai languages keep them separate, as /k/ and /x/.

=== Low Ka ===
Like in other Indic scripts, Tai Tham consonants have the inherent vowel "a", and take one of several modifying vowel signs to represent syllables with another vowel.

Tai Tham Low Ka with vowel matras
Syllable type	ga	gā	gi	gī	gư	gư̄	gu	gū	gē	gǣ	gō
Closed or open	ᨣ	ᨣᩤ	ᨣᩥ	ᨣᩦ	ᨣᩧ	ᨣᩨ	ᨣᩩ	ᨣᩪ	ᨣᩮ	ᨣᩯ	ᨣᩮᩤ
	gai	gaư	gau				gō̹i				
Open	ᨣᩱ	ᨣᩲ	ᨣᩮᩢᩤ	ᨣᩮᩫᩢᩤ	ᨣᩮᩫᩤ	ᨣᩳ	ᨣᩭ				
	go	ga	gō	gœ̄		gō̹				go̹	
Open	ᨣᩰᩡ	ᨣᩡ	ᨣᩰ	ᨣᩮᩬᩥ	ᨣᩮᩦ	ᨣᩬᩴ	ᨣᩴ	ᨣᩬᩳ	ᨣᩳ	ᨣᩰᩬᩡ	ᨣᩰᩬ
Closed	ᨣᩫ	ᨣᩢ	ᨣᩰᩫ	ᨣᩮᩥ	ᨣᩮᩦ	ᨣᩬ				ᨣᩬᩢ	
	gūa	gīa		gư̄a							
Open	ᨣ᩠ᩅᩫ	ᨣ᩠ᨿᩮ	ᨣᩮᩢ᩠ᨿ	ᨣᩮᩬᩥᩋ	ᨣᩮᩬᩨᩋ	ᨣᩮᩬᩨ					
Closed	ᨣ᩠ᩅ	ᨣ᩠ᨿ		ᨣᩮᩬᩥ	ᨣᩮᩬᩨ						

Notes:

1. The transliteration scheme is an amalgamation of the ALA-LC schemes of Khmer, Pali and Lao.
2. Many of the matras include subscript wa, subscript ya, subscript a or even the letter a itself. Anusvara and visarga are also used.
3. In the relevant Tai languages, a short vowel in an open syllable includes an underlyinɡ ɡlottal stop.

Additional short vowels not shown above may be synthesised from the corresponding long vowel by appending visarga for open syllables (as shown for go) or applying mai sat for closed syllables (as shown for go̹). Unlike the other languages, Lao instead replaces an ī or ư̄ glyph by the corresponding short vowel.

The lack of a vowel between consonants notated as consonants is indicated by vertically stacking the consonants, generally without their touching. The Brahmi style of writing final consonants small and low developed, as vestigially seen in Khmer and Lao, into using subscripting to indicate that a consonant had no vowel of its own. In theory this leaves it ambiguous as to whether a consonant precedes or follows the vowel, but ambiguous cases are rare. Finally, if there is no room for the consonant below, it may be left as an 'independent' consonant or. in some cases, written superscript. Occasionally the visible virama (ra haam) is used, but this may signify that the consonant so marked is silent. The vowel /a/ will be made explicit if the final consonant is notated by a letter and is included in the same stack as the initial consonant or is written in a stack just consisting of that consonant.

Low Ka can serve as the initial consonant of a stack, and several examples can be seen above. It can also occur as the final element of a consonant stack in words of Indic origin, both in the cluster gg of a Pali word ᨾᨣ᩠ᨣ magga 'road' and as the final consonant after apocation of the final vowel, e.g. ᨶᩣ᩠ᨣ nāg 'nāga'.

In writing systems that make use of tall aa, as the initial letter of an akshara the letter is followed by tall aa. as shown in the table of matras above. This is because the sequence of letter and round aa ᨣᩣ could formerly be very similar to the independent letter high ka. This rule is frequently neglected when a mark above would clearly disambiguate the two.

=== Low Khha ===
Like in other Indic scripts, Tai Tham consonants have the inherent vowel "a", and take one of several modifying vowel signs to represent syllables with another vowel.

Tai Tham Low Khha with vowel matras
Syllable type	G̣a	G̣ā	G̣i	G̣ī	G̣ư	G̣ư̄	G̣u	G̣ū	G̣ē	G̣ǣ	G̣ō
Closed or open	ᨤ	ᨤᩣ	ᨤᩥ	ᨤᩦ	ᨤᩧ	ᨤᩨ	ᨤᩩ	ᨤᩪ	ᨤᩮ	ᨤᩯ	ᨤᩮᩣ
	G̣ai	G̣aư	G̣au			G̣ō̹i					
Open	ᨤᩱ	ᨤᩲ	ᨤᩮᩢᩣ	ᨤᩮᩫᩣ	ᨤᩳ	ᨤᩭ					
	G̣o	G̣a	G̣ō	G̣œ̄	G̣ō̹				G̣o̹		
Open	ᨤᩰᩡ	ᨤᩡ	ᨤᩰ	ᨤᩮᩬᩥ	ᨤᩬᩴ	ᨤᩴ	ᨤᩬᩳ	ᨤᩳ	ᨤᩰᩬᩡ	ᨤᩰᩬ	
Closed	ᨤᩫ	ᨤᩢ	ᨤᩰᩫ	ᨤᩮᩥ	ᨤᩬ				ᨤᩬᩢ		
	G̣ūa	G̣īa	G̣ư̄a								
Open	ᨤ᩠ᩅᩫ	ᨤ᩠ᨿᩮ	ᨤᩮᩬᩥᩋ	ᨤᩮᩬᩨᩋ	ᨤᩮᩬᩨ						
Closed	ᨤ᩠ᩅ	ᨤ᩠ᨿ	ᨤᩮᩬᩥ	ᨤᩮᩬᩨ							

Notes:

1. The transliteration scheme is an amalgamation of the ALA-LC schemes of Khmer, Pali and Lao.
2. Many of the matras include subscript wa, subscript ya, subscript a or even the letter a itself. Anusvara and visarga are also used.
3. In the relevant Tai languages, a short vowel in an open syllable includes an underlyinɡ ɡlottal stop.

This form occurs only as the initial consonant of a syllable. This letter combined in aksharas with the dependent vowel Ā uses round aa, as shown in the table of matras above, rather than tall aa.

== Comparison of Ga ==
The various Indic scripts are generally related to each other through adaptation and borrowing, and as such the glyphs for cognate letters, including Ga, are related as well.

Comparison of Ga in different scripts

Aramaic
Kharoṣṭhī 𐨒	Ashoka Brahmi	Kushana Brahmi (Note: The middle "Kushana" form of Brahmi is a later style that emerged as Brahmi scripts were beginning to proliferate. Gupta Brahmi was definitely a stylistic descendant from Kushana, but other Brahmi-derived scripts may have descended from earlier forms.)	Tocharian (Note: Tocharian is probably derived from the middle period "Kushana" form of Brahmi, although artifacts from that time are not plentiful enough to establish a definite succession.)
Gupta Brahmi	Pallava
Kadamba -
Bhaiksuki 𑰐	Siddhaṃ	Grantha 𑌗	Cham ꨈ
Sinhala ග	Pyu / Old Mon (Note: Pyu and Old Mon are probably the precursors of the Burmese script, and may be derived from either the Pallava or Kadamba script) -
Tibetan	Newa 𑐐	Ahom 𑜕	Malayalam ഗ
Telugu గ	Burmese ဂ
Lepcha ᰃ	Ranjana	Saurashtra ꢔ	Dives Akuru 𑤎
Kannada ಗ	Kayah Li ꤌ
Limbu ᤃ	Soyombo (Note: May also be derived from Devangari (see bottom left of table)) 𑩞	Khmer គ	Tamil -
Chakma 𑄉	Tai Tham ᨣ / ᨤ
Meitei Mayek ꯒ	Gaudi -	Thai ค / ฅ	Lao ຄ
Tai Le -
Marchen 𑱴	Tirhuta 𑒑	New Tai Lue ᦅ / ᦆ	Tai Viet ꪆ / ꪇ	Aksara Kawi
'Phags-pa ꡂ	Odia ଗ	Sharada 𑆓	Rejang ꤱ	Batak ᯎ / ᯏ	Buginese ᨁ
Zanabazar Square 𑨍	Bengali–Assamese	Takri 𑚌	Javanese ꦒ	Balinese ᬕ	Makasar 𑻡
Hangul (Note: The Origin of Hangul from 'Phags-pa is one of limited influence, inspiring at most a few basic letter shapes. Hangul does not function as an Indic abugida.) ㄱ	Northern Nagari -	Dogri 𑠌	Laṇḍā -	Sundanese ᮌ	Baybayin ᜄ
Modi 𑘐	Gujarati ગ	Khojki 𑈊	Khudabadi 𑊼	Mahajani 𑅗	Tagbanwa ᝤ
Devanagari	Nandinagari 𑦰	Kaithi	Gurmukhi ਗ	Multani 𑊆	Buhid ᝄ
Canadian Syllabics (Note: Although the basic letter forms of the Canadian Aboriginal Syllabics were derived from handwritten Devanagari letters, this abugida indicates vowel sounds by rotations of the letter form, rather than the use of vowel diacritics as is standard in Indic abugidas.) ᑫ	Soyombo (Note: May also be derived from Ranjana (see above)) 𑩞	Sylheti Nagari ꠉ	Gunjala Gondi 𑵶	Masaram Gondi (Note: Masaram Gondi acts as an Indic abugida, but its letterforms were not derived from any single precursor script.) 𑴎	Hanuno'o ᜤ

== Character encodings of Ga ==
Most Indic scripts are encoded in the Unicode Standard, and as such the letter Ga in those scripts can be represented in plain text with unique codepoint. Ga from several modern-use scripts can also be found in legacy encodings, such as ISCII.

Character information
Preview					గ		ଗ		ಗ		ഗ		ગ		ਗ	
Unicode name	DEVANAGARI LETTER GA		BENGALI LETTER GA		TELUGU LETTER GA		ORIYA LETTER GA		KANNADA LETTER GA		MALAYALAM LETTER GA		GUJARATI LETTER GA		GURMUKHI LETTER GA	
Encodings	decimal	hex	dec	hex	dec	hex	dec	hex	dec	hex	dec	hex	dec	hex	dec	hex
Unicode	2327	U+0917	2455	U+0997	3095	U+0C17	2839	U+0B17	3223	U+0C97	3351	U+0D17	2711	U+0A97	2583	U+0A17
UTF-8	224 164 151	E0 A4 97	224 166 151	E0 A6 97	224 176 151	E0 B0 97	224 172 151	E0 AC 97	224 178 151	E0 B2 97	224 180 151	E0 B4 97	224 170 151	E0 AA 97	224 168 151	E0 A8 97
Numeric character reference	&#2327;	&#x917;	&#2455;	&#x997;	&#3095;	&#xC17;	&#2839;	&#xB17;	&#3223;	&#xC97;	&#3351;	&#xD17;	&#2711;	&#xA97;	&#2583;	&#xA17;
ISCII	181	B5	181	B5	181	B5	181	B5	181	B5	181	B5	181	B5	181	B5

Character information
Preview	Ashoka Kushana Gupta		𐨒				𑌗	
Unicode name	BRAHMI LETTER GA		KHAROSHTHI LETTER GA		SIDDHAM LETTER GA		GRANTHA LETTER GA	
Encodings	decimal	hex	dec	hex	dec	hex	dec	hex
Unicode	69653	U+11015	68114	U+10A12	71056	U+11590	70423	U+11317
UTF-8	240 145 128 149	F0 91 80 95	240 144 168 146	F0 90 A8 92	240 145 150 144	F0 91 96 90	240 145 140 151	F0 91 8C 97
UTF-16	55300 56341	D804 DC15	55298 56850	D802 DE12	55301 56720	D805 DD90	55300 57111	D804 DF17
Numeric character reference	&#69653;	&#x11015;	&#68114;	&#x10A12;	&#71056;	&#x11590;	&#70423;	&#x11317;

Character information
Preview			ྒ		ꡂ		𑨍		𑐐		𑰐		𑆓	
Unicode name	TIBETAN LETTER GA		TIBETAN SUBJOINED LETTER GA		PHAGS-PA LETTER GA		ZANABAZAR SQUARE LETTER GA		NEWA LETTER GA		BHAIKSUKI LETTER GA		SHARADA LETTER GA	
Encodings	decimal	hex	dec	hex	dec	hex	dec	hex	dec	hex	dec	hex	dec	hex
Unicode	3906	U+0F42	3986	U+0F92	43074	U+A842	72205	U+11A0D	70672	U+11410	72720	U+11C10	70035	U+11193
UTF-8	224 189 130	E0 BD 82	224 190 146	E0 BE 92	234 161 130	EA A1 82	240 145 168 141	F0 91 A8 8D	240 145 144 144	F0 91 90 90	240 145 176 144	F0 91 B0 90	240 145 134 147	F0 91 86 93
UTF-16	3906	0F42	3986	0F92	43074	A842	55302 56845	D806 DE0D	55301 56336	D805 DC10	55303 56336	D807 DC10	55300 56723	D804 DD93
Numeric character reference	&#3906;	&#xF42;	&#3986;	&#xF92;	&#43074;	&#xA842;	&#72205;	&#x11A0D;	&#70672;	&#x11410;	&#72720;	&#x11C10;	&#70035;	&#x11193;

Character information
Preview	ဂ		ᨣ		ᨤ		ᦅ		ᦆ	
Unicode name	MYANMAR LETTER GA		TAI THAM LETTER LOW KA		TAI THAM LETTER LOW KXA		NEW TAI LUE LETTER LOW KA		NEW TAI LUE LETTER LOW XA	
Encodings	decimal	hex	dec	hex	dec	hex	dec	hex	dec	hex
Unicode	4098	U+1002	6691	U+1A23	6692	U+1A24	6533	U+1985	6534	U+1986
UTF-8	225 128 130	E1 80 82	225 168 163	E1 A8 A3	225 168 164	E1 A8 A4	225 166 133	E1 A6 85	225 166 134	E1 A6 86
Numeric character reference	&#4098;	&#x1002;	&#6691;	&#x1A23;	&#6692;	&#x1A24;	&#6533;	&#x1985;	&#6534;	&#x1986;

Character information
Preview	គ		ຄ		ค		ฅ		ꪆ		ꪇ	
Unicode name	KHMER LETTER KO		LAO LETTER KHO TAM		THAI CHARACTER KHO KHWAI		THAI CHARACTER KHO KHON		TAI VIET LETTER LOW GO		TAI VIET LETTER HIGH GO	
Encodings	decimal	hex	dec	hex	dec	hex	dec	hex	dec	hex	dec	hex
Unicode	6018	U+1782	3716	U+0E84	3588	U+0E04	3589	U+0E05	43654	U+AA86	43655	U+AA87
UTF-8	225 158 130	E1 9E 82	224 186 132	E0 BA 84	224 184 132	E0 B8 84	224 184 133	E0 B8 85	234 170 134	EA AA 86	234 170 135	EA AA 87
Numeric character reference	&#6018;	&#x1782;	&#3716;	&#xE84;	&#3588;	&#xE04;	&#3589;	&#xE05;	&#43654;	&#xAA86;	&#43655;	&#xAA87;

Character information
Preview	ග		ꤌ		𑄉		𑜕		𑤎		ꢔ		ꨈ	
Unicode name	SINHALA LETTER ALPAPRAANA GAYANNA		KAYAH LI LETTER GA		CHAKMA LETTER GAA		AHOM LETTER GA		DIVES AKURU LETTER GA		SAURASHTRA LETTER GA		CHAM LETTER GA	
Encodings	decimal	hex	dec	hex	dec	hex	dec	hex	dec	hex	dec	hex	dec	hex
Unicode	3484	U+0D9C	43276	U+A90C	69897	U+11109	71445	U+11715	71950	U+1190E	43156	U+A894	43528	U+AA08
UTF-8	224 182 156	E0 B6 9C	234 164 140	EA A4 8C	240 145 132 137	F0 91 84 89	240 145 156 149	F0 91 9C 95	240 145 164 142	F0 91 A4 8E	234 162 148	EA A2 94	234 168 136	EA A8 88
UTF-16	3484	0D9C	43276	A90C	55300 56585	D804 DD09	55301 57109	D805 DF15	55302 56590	D806 DD0E	43156	A894	43528	AA08
Numeric character reference	&#3484;	&#xD9C;	&#43276;	&#xA90C;	&#69897;	&#x11109;	&#71445;	&#x11715;	&#71950;	&#x1190E;	&#43156;	&#xA894;	&#43528;	&#xAA08;

Character information
Preview	𑘐		𑦰		𑩞		ꠉ		𑵶			
Unicode name	MODI LETTER GA		NANDINAGARI LETTER GA		SOYOMBO LETTER GA		SYLOTI NAGRI LETTER GO		GUNJALA GONDI LETTER GA		KAITHI LETTER GA	
Encodings	decimal	hex	dec	hex	dec	hex	dec	hex	dec	hex	dec	hex
Unicode	71184	U+11610	72112	U+119B0	72286	U+11A5E	43017	U+A809	73078	U+11D76	69775	U+1108F
UTF-8	240 145 152 144	F0 91 98 90	240 145 166 176	F0 91 A6 B0	240 145 169 158	F0 91 A9 9E	234 160 137	EA A0 89	240 145 181 182	F0 91 B5 B6	240 145 130 143	F0 91 82 8F
UTF-16	55301 56848	D805 DE10	55302 56752	D806 DDB0	55302 56926	D806 DE5E	43017	A809	55303 56694	D807 DD76	55300 56463	D804 DC8F
Numeric character reference	&#71184;	&#x11610;	&#72112;	&#x119B0;	&#72286;	&#x11A5E;	&#43017;	&#xA809;	&#73078;	&#x11D76;	&#69775;	&#x1108F;

Character information
Preview	𑒑		ᰃ		ᤃ		ꯒ		𑱴	
Unicode name	TIRHUTA LETTER GA		LEPCHA LETTER GA		LIMBU LETTER GA		MEETEI MAYEK LETTER GOK		MARCHEN LETTER GA	
Encodings	decimal	hex	dec	hex	dec	hex	dec	hex	dec	hex
Unicode	70801	U+11491	7171	U+1C03	6403	U+1903	43986	U+ABD2	72820	U+11C74
UTF-8	240 145 146 145	F0 91 92 91	225 176 131	E1 B0 83	225 164 131	E1 A4 83	234 175 146	EA AF 92	240 145 177 180	F0 91 B1 B4
UTF-16	55301 56465	D805 DC91	7171	1C03	6403	1903	43986	ABD2	55303 56436	D807 DC74
Numeric character reference	&#70801;	&#x11491;	&#7171;	&#x1C03;	&#6403;	&#x1903;	&#43986;	&#xABD2;	&#72820;	&#x11C74;

Character information
Preview	𑚌		𑠌		𑈊		𑊼		𑅗		𑊆	
Unicode name	TAKRI LETTER GA		DOGRA LETTER GA		KHOJKI LETTER GA		KHUDAWADI LETTER GA		MAHAJANI LETTER GA		MULTANI LETTER GA	
Encodings	decimal	hex	dec	hex	dec	hex	dec	hex	dec	hex	dec	hex
Unicode	71308	U+1168C	71692	U+1180C	70154	U+1120A	70332	U+112BC	69975	U+11157	70278	U+11286
UTF-8	240 145 154 140	F0 91 9A 8C	240 145 160 140	F0 91 A0 8C	240 145 136 138	F0 91 88 8A	240 145 138 188	F0 91 8A BC	240 145 133 151	F0 91 85 97	240 145 138 134	F0 91 8A 86
UTF-16	55301 56972	D805 DE8C	55302 56332	D806 DC0C	55300 56842	D804 DE0A	55300 57020	D804 DEBC	55300 56663	D804 DD57	55300 56966	D804 DE86
Numeric character reference	&#71308;	&#x1168C;	&#71692;	&#x1180C;	&#70154;	&#x1120A;	&#70332;	&#x112BC;	&#69975;	&#x11157;	&#70278;	&#x11286;

Character information
Preview	ᬕ		ᯎ		ᨁ		ꦒ		𑻡		ꤱ		ᮌ	
Unicode name	BALINESE LETTER GA		BATAK LETTER GA		BUGINESE LETTER GA		JAVANESE LETTER GA		MAKASAR LETTER GA		REJANG LETTER GA		SUNDANESE LETTER GA	
Encodings	decimal	hex	dec	hex	dec	hex	dec	hex	dec	hex	dec	hex	dec	hex
Unicode	6933	U+1B15	7118	U+1BCE	6657	U+1A01	43410	U+A992	73441	U+11EE1	43313	U+A931	7052	U+1B8C
UTF-8	225 172 149	E1 AC 95	225 175 142	E1 AF 8E	225 168 129	E1 A8 81	234 166 146	EA A6 92	240 145 187 161	F0 91 BB A1	234 164 177	EA A4 B1	225 174 140	E1 AE 8C
UTF-16	6933	1B15	7118	1BCE	6657	1A01	43410	A992	55303 57057	D807 DEE1	43313	A931	7052	1B8C
Numeric character reference	&#6933;	&#x1B15;	&#7118;	&#x1BCE;	&#6657;	&#x1A01;	&#43410;	&#xA992;	&#73441;	&#x11EE1;	&#43313;	&#xA931;	&#7052;	&#x1B8C;

Character information
Preview	ᜄ		ᝤ		ᝄ		ᜤ		𑴎	
Unicode name	TAGALOG LETTER GA		TAGBANWA LETTER GA		BUHID LETTER GA		HANUNOO LETTER GA		MASARAM GONDI LETTER GA	
Encodings	decimal	hex	dec	hex	dec	hex	dec	hex	dec	hex
Unicode	5892	U+1704	5988	U+1764	5956	U+1744	5924	U+1724	72974	U+11D0E
UTF-8	225 156 132	E1 9C 84	225 157 164	E1 9D A4	225 157 132	E1 9D 84	225 156 164	E1 9C A4	240 145 180 142	F0 91 B4 8E
UTF-16	5892	1704	5988	1764	5956	1744	5924	1724	55303 56590	D807 DD0E
Numeric character reference	&#5892;	&#x1704;	&#5988;	&#x1764;	&#5956;	&#x1744;	&#5924;	&#x1724;	&#72974;	&#x11D0E;

Character information
Preview	ᑫ		ᑭ		ᑯ		ᑲ		ᒃ	
Unicode name	CANADIAN SYLLABICS KE		CANADIAN SYLLABICS KI		CANADIAN SYLLABICS KO		CANADIAN SYLLABICS KA		CANADIAN SYLLABICS K	
Encodings	decimal	hex	dec	hex	dec	hex	dec	hex	dec	hex
Unicode	5227	U+146B	5229	U+146D	5231	U+146F	5234	U+1472	5251	U+1483
UTF-8	225 145 171	E1 91 AB	225 145 173	E1 91 AD	225 145 175	E1 91 AF	225 145 178	E1 91 B2	225 146 131	E1 92 83
Numeric character reference	&#5227;	&#x146B;	&#5229;	&#x146D;	&#5231;	&#x146F;	&#5234;	&#x1472;	&#5251;	&#x1483;

- The full range of KE Canadian syllabic characters can be found at the codepoint ranges 146B-1488, 166F, 18B8-18B9, & 18D6.

== See also ==
- Gimel
