= Thomas Gass =

Swiss Diplomat

Thomas Gass is a Swiss diplomat who currently serves as Ambassador of Switzerland to the Socialist Republic of Viet Nam. On 8 July 2026, he was elected by the OECD Development Assistance Committee to be its next Chair for the period 2027-2030. He has held senior leadership roles within the United Nations and the Swiss Agency for Development and Cooperation (SDC), with a focus on international development policy, multilateral cooperation, and implementation of global development frameworks. He has also gained extensive field operations experience, directly managing cooperation projects in countries like Cameroon, Russia, Guyana, or Nepal, and managing large institutional portfolios across the globe, including crisis situations Myanmar, Afghanistan). `` Gass could be described as a Pragmatic Internationalist , ie. strongly attached to the global goals and values (UN Charter, Geneva Conventions, Universal Declaration of Human Rights, Beijing Platform for Action, Agenda 2030, Paris Climate Agreement, etc), as well as to multilateral cooperation, international law, and global solidarity, while promoting institutional reforms and pragmatic approaches responding to changing context, challenges and opportunities.

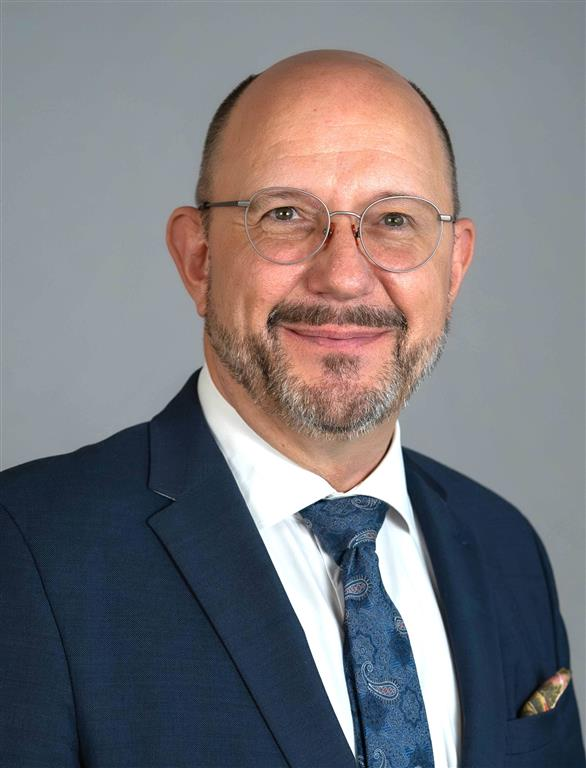
Thomas Gass, Ambassador

== Education ==
Gass holds a PhD in natural sciences and an MSc in engineering diploma in agricultural sciences, both from the Swiss Federal Institute of Technology in Zurich (ETH). He prepared his Baccalaureate in Mathematics and Physics at the Externat Notre Dame in Grenoble, France.

== Career ==
Multilateral and United Nations Work

From 2013 to 2017, Gass served as Assistant Secretary-General for Policy Coordination and Inter-Agency Affairs in the United Nations Department of Economic and Social Affairs (UN DESA). In this capacity, he contributed to coordination across UN entities and supported intergovernmental processes on development policy.

During his tenure, he was involved in the preparation, promotion and implementation of the 2030 Agenda for Sustainable Development and its Sustainable Development Goals (SDGs). He also served as an ex officio member of the Secretary-General’s Independent Expert Advisory Group on a Data Revolution for Sustainable Development, which produced the report A World That Counts, highlighting the role of data in achieving sustainable development objectives.

Swiss diplomatic and development roles

From 2018 to 2022, Gass was Assistant Director-General and Head of the South Cooperation Department at the Swiss Agency for Development and Cooperation (SDC). In this role, he oversaw Switzerland’s bilateral and multilateral development programmes in partner countries and contributed to shaping Swiss international development policy. Between 2019 and 2022, he also served as Co-Chair of the Global Partnership for Effective Development Co-operation. In this capacity, he helped guide global policy dialogue on development effectiveness and co-organized the Partnership’s high-level summit held in Geneva in December 2022.

In 2023, Gass was appointed Ambassador of Switzerland to Vietnam. In this role, he represents Swiss interests and oversees bilateral relations, including economic cooperation and development partnerships.

Earlier diplomatic postings and roles

From 2009 to 2013, Gass served as Ambassador of Switzerland to Nepal and Country Director of the SDC. During his tenure, he oversaw the establishment of Switzerland’s embassy in Kathmandu and directed a development cooperation programme of significant scale. He also chaired the donors of the Nepal Peace Trust Fund, supporting the country’s post-conflict peace process.

From 2004 to 2009, he headed the Economic and Development Section at the Permanent Mission of Switzerland to the United Nations in New York. He represented Switzerland in bodies including the Economic and Social Council (ECOSOC), the UN General Assembly, and the executive boards of UN development agencies. He also chaired the donor group of the United Nations Global Compact and facilitated negotiations on the Quadrennial Comprehensive Policy Review (QCPR), a key framework governing UN development operations.

Earlier in his career, Gass held diverse positions at the Swiss Agency for Development and Cooperation, served as Deputy Resident Representative of the United Nations Development Programme (UNDP) in Guyana, and worked as Regional Director for Europe at the International Plant Genetic Resources Institute (Bioversity International).

== Other activities ==
Gass has been involved in several international initiatives related to development and global governance. He notably served on the Board of the Global Community Engagement and Resilience Fund (2018–2022), representing Switzerland, and contributed to global efforts aimed at preventing violent extremism through community-based approaches.. From 2013-2017, he also represented the UN Secretary General on the Board of the United Nations University, Tokyo, Japan. From 2019-2022, he was Co-chair of the Global Partnership on Effective development Cooperation (GPEDC).

== Personal life ==
Gass is married and parent of three adult children. He is a dual national of Switzerland and France.
