= Kabiru Alhassan Rurum =

Nigerian politician, economist and teacher

Kabiru Alhassan Rurum Turakin Rano

Member of the House of Representatives of Nigeria from Kano
- Incumbent
- Assumed office 11 June 2019
- Preceded by: Mohammed Sani
- Constituency: Rano/Bunkure/Kibiya

Speaker Kano State House of Assembly
- In office 30 July 2018 – 10 June 2019
- Preceded by: Yusuf Abdullahi Ata
- Succeeded by: Abdulaziz Garba Gafasa

Majority leader of Kano State House of Assembly
- Preceded by: Hamisu Chidari
- Succeeded by: Yusuf Abdullahi Ata

Personal details
- Born: 1 January 1970 (age 56) Rano
- Party: NNPP (since May 2022)
- Other political affiliations: APC PDP
- Education: Federal College of Education, Kano; Obafemi Awolowo University
- Occupation: Politics
- Profession: Business
- Website: https://kanoassembly.gov.ng/kabir-alhassan-rurum/

Kabiru Alhassan Rurum is a Nigerian politician and businessman from Kano State who serves as the speaker of Kano State House of Assembly from 2015 - 2017 and 2018 - 2019. He is the current member of the House of Representatives from Rano/Bunkure/Kibiya Federal Constituency in Kano State since 2019. Rurum is a traditional title holder from Rano Emirate as Turakin Rano.

== Early life and education ==
Kabiru was born on 1 January 1970 in Katanga quarters of Rurum in Rano Local Government Area of Kano State. He attended Rurum Central Primary School between 1977 and 1982, Government Junior Secondary Rurum, between 1983 and 1985 and then proceeded to the Government Grammar Secondary School, Rano between 1985 and 1988 where he obtained his SSCE certificate.

He obtained his National Diploma in Administration Management at Obafemi Awolowo University Ile – Ife in 2000 and his Advance Diploma from Federal College of Education, Kano in 2002.

== Business ==
Kabiru started his business in Kano State the Nigerian Center of Commerce before moving to Lagos State. He was once the chairman of Mile 12 Perishable Market which become his breakthrough in politics. He started his political career in Lagos State from a Market Leader to the Councilor. He also hold the traditional title of "Turakin Hausawa of Kosofe Land".

== Politics ==
Kabiru Was elected Councillor in Ward 'F' Ikosi/Ketu/M12/Maidan/Agiliti/Awode Elede of Kosofe Local Government Area of Lagos State in 1997 after saving his term as a Councillor representing Hausa Community in Lagos State and then returned to his home town Kano State where he was appointed Supervisory Councillor for Works in Rano Local Government Council where he served between 2000 and 2002

Kabiru was first elected as member of Kano State House of Assembly to represent Rano constituency in 2011 Nigerian General Election where he won the election and become the Majority Leader in Kano State House of Assembly.

Kabiru become the Speaker of Kano State House of Assembly after winning his second election in 2015 Nigerian general election.

Kabiru resigned from the speaker of the House due to the allegation against him, Kabiru make several attempt to impeached Yusuf Abdullahi Ata but Kano State Governor Abdullahi Umar Ganduje intervene and Hamisu Chidari sacrifice his Deputy speaker seat to Kabiru to achieve peace in the house, Kabiru accepted and become the Deputy Speaker but on 30 July 2018 completed his mission with the help of 26 out of the 40 Members of Kano State House of Assembly impeached Ata, based on the claim that he cannot run the affairs of the House, the motion was raised by Labaran Abdul Madari Member Representing Warawa Constituency and second by Abdullahi Chiromawa Member Representing Kura/Garum Mallam Constituency Kabiru replaced his successor to return to his Seat that is the Speaker while Hamisu Chidari returned as the Deputy Speaker and Baffa Babba Danagundi as the Majority leader.

Kabiru was elected Member in the 2019 Nigerian general election to represent Rano/Bunkure/Kibiya Federal constituency in the Nigerian House of Representative.

Kabiru have a traditional title in Rano Emirate Council, Turakin Rano who was turbaned by the late Emir of Rano Alhaji Tafida Abubakar Ila the 2nd
