= Labaran Abdul Madari =

Nigerian politician

Majority Leader Kano State House of Assembly
- Incumbent
- Assumed office 10 June 2019
- Preceded by: Baffa Babba Danagundi

Chief Whip Kano State House of Assembly
- In office 2015–2019
- Succeeded by: Labaran Ayuba

Personal details
- Born: 22 June 1968 (age 58) Warawa
- Party: All Progressive Congress (APC)
- Relations: Married
- Education: Federal College of Education, Kano
- Occupation: Politician
- Profession: Lawmaker
- Website: https://kanoassembly.gov.ng

Labaran Abdul Madari, more commonly known as Abdul Madari, is a lawmaker from Kano State and a Nigerian politician. He was elected the Majority Leader for the second time in the Kano State House of Assembly on 15 December 2020.

== Early life and education ==
Abdul Madari was born in 1968 at Madarin Mata of the Warawa Local Government Area of Kano State. He attended Kawo Cikin Gari Primary School in Warawa, and Government Secondary School in Garko. Madari also attended Minjibir Teacher's College for his Grade II Certificate and he obtained his diploma from the Federal College of Education, Kano.

== Politics ==
Madari was elected as a Member of Kano State House of Assembly in 2007 Nigerian general election and retained the seat for over three consecutive elections in 2011, 2015, and 2019. and is currently serving his fourth term. He is in the circle of principal officers of the Kano State House of Assembly, where he served as the Chief Whip from 2015 to 2019, and became the Majority leader in 2019 before he was impeached in 2020. Madari and 4 others were unlawfully suspended by the Speaker of the house, and the court declared their suspension a violation of Section 109 of the 1999 Nigerian Constitution.

On 14 December 2020, Right Honourable Abdulaziz Garba Gafasa resigned as the speaker of Kano State House of Assembly, and Hamisu Chidari was elected the Speaker of the House together with Madari as Majority Leader on 15 December 2020.
