= Baffa Babba Danagundi =

Nigerian politician

Managing Director Kano Road Traffic Agency
- Incumbent
- Assumed office 2019

Majority Leader Kano State House of Assembly
- In office 2018–2019
- Preceded by: Muhammad Bello Butu Butu
- Succeeded by: Labaran Abdul Madari

Personal details
- Born: 22 June 1973 (age 53) Kano Municipal
- Party: All Progressive Congress (APC)
- Relations: Married
- Education: Kano State Polytechnic; Bayero University Kano
- Profession: Politician
- Website: https://kanoassembly.gov.ng/baffa-babba/

Baffa Babba Danagundi, popularly known as Baffanyo, a Nigerian politician, former Majority Leader in the Kano State House of Assembly

== Early life and education ==
Baffa was born in Kofar Danagundi quarters of Kano Municipal in the year 1973 he is from the family of late Babba Danagundi one of the Kingmakers of Kano Emirate Council with the traditional title Sarkin Dawaki Mai Tuta and great grandson to Jamo of the Sullubawa Fulani Clan

Baffa attended Gidan Makama Special Primary School between 1981 and 1986, he also attended Government Technical College, Wudil between 1986 and 1989, and Unity College, Karaye between 1989 and 1992. Baffa obtained his National Diploma and Higher National Diploma from Kano State Polytechnic. He Obtained MBA from Bayero University Kano

== Career ==
Baffa started his career as an Assistant Clerical Officer up to Principal Registrar in Kano State High Court of Justice where he voluntary resigned and joined politics

== Politics ==
Baffa Was the Acting Chairman of Kano Municipal who was appointed by former Governor of Kano State Malam Ibrahim Shekarau in 2007, Baffa was also Senior Special Assistant to former Governor of Kano State Rabiu Kwankwaso between 2012 and 2014.

Baffa was elected Member of Kano State House of Assembly on the platform of All Progressives Congress (APC) in 2015 Nigerian general election he defeated the incumbent Member Salisu Maje Ahmad Gwangwazo of Peoples Democratic Party (PDP). Baffa was elected the Majority leader in 2018 after the impeachment of the former speaker of the House Yusuf Abdullahi Ata and the Majority Leader Muhammad Bello Butu Butu Baffa Chaired so many committee in the house of assembly which include the investigation committee on the controversial Video Clip showing a Kano State Governor, Abdullahi Umar Ganduje receiving $5 million bribe in October 2018 which was published by Jaafar Jaafar on his online publication company Daily Nigerian. Baffa was also the Vice chairman of Committee set to investigating former Emir of Kano Sanusi Lamido Sanusi on eight-count charges of allegation/defamation of character, breach of oath of office/oath of allegiance, abuse of office privileges and protocol and political and religious interference. He also contested in 2019 Nigerian General Election where he lost to the parson he defeated in 2015 Salisu Maje Ahmad Gwangwazo of Peoples Democratic Party (PDP). Baffa was appointed the Managing Director of Kano Road Traffic Agency (KAROTA), by Kano State Governor Abdullahi Umar Ganduje after he lost in the 2019 Nigerian General Election In July 2024, President Bola Ahmed Tinubu appointed Baffa Babba Danagundi as the new Director-General of the National Productivity Centre (NPC). A month later Concerned Kano Citizens, a civil liberty organization, accused DanAgundi of leading a group of people who violently disrupted an otherwise peaceful protest.
