= Hamisu Chidari =

Nigerian politician

Engr. Hamisu Ibrahim Chidari

Speaker Kano State House of Assembly
- Incumbent
- Assumed office 15 December 2020
- Preceded by: Abdulaziz Garba Gafasa

Chairman Makoda LGA
- In office 1996–1998

Personal details
- Born: 22 April 1967 (age 59) Makoda
- Party: All Progressive Congress (APC)
- Relations: Married
- Education: Bayero University, Kano BUK
- Occupation: Politician
- Profession: Engineer
- Website: https://kanoassembly.gov.ng

Hamisu Ibrahim Chidari (born 1967), popularly known as Engr, is a mechanical engineer and a Nigerian politician who has served as Speaker of the Kano State House of Assembly since 5 December 2020.

== Early life and education ==
Right Honourable Chidari was born in Chidari village of Makoda Local Government Area of Kano State, he attended Batta Primary School, Dambatta between 1975 and 1981, he attended Government Secondary School, Dambatta between 1981 and 1986, he also attended College of Arts, Science and Remedial Studies (CAS) between 1986 and 1988, he obtained Bachelor of Science in Electrical Engineer from Bayero University, Kano in 1992.

== Career ==
After his National Youth Service Corps in 1993, he worked with Moland Communication Limited Ibadan, he also worked with ABG Communications Limited Kaduna between 1993 and 1996, where he joined politics in 1996.

== Politics ==
Chidari was Elected the Chairman of Makoda Local Government Area of Kano State under the Military Administration of Colonel Dominic Oneya while General Sani Abacha was the President of the Federal Republic of Nigeria after dissolution of all the political parties by Abacha in 1993 during the 1996 Local Government Election in Nigeria the representatives of the candidates stand while the voters queued behind the representative of the candidate of their choice and the electoral office counted, recorded and determined the winner thereafter, that is how Engineer Chidari emerged as the Chairman of Makoda Local Government Area in 1996.

He become the member, in 1999 Nigerian general election, in 2003 Chidari lost his seat in Kano State House of Assembly, he joined the rest again in 2007 Nigerian general election where he emerge victories and retained the seat for good three elections that is 2011, 2015, and 2019 respectively where he is serving for the fifth term. he was in the circle of principal officers of the Kano State House of Assembly where he served as the Deputy Speaker where he voluntarily stepped down from the Deputy Speaker because of the crises in the House for peace to rise when Kabiru Alhassan Rurum wanted to be in the circle of principal office again, after he was resigned from the leadership of the house on 4 July 2017 who was the speaker at that time, Rurum became the Deputy Speaker in 2018 Chadari returned to his position of the Deputy Speaker immediately after the impeachment of Yusuf Abdullahi Ata on 30 July 2018 and Kabiru Alhassan Rurum returned to his position of the Speaker of Kano State House of Assembly.

In the 2019 Nigerian general election Chidari was re-elected to Kano State House of Assembly and the House Members asked him to continued as the Deputy Speaker when the elected Abdulaziz Garba Gafasa as the Speaker of Kano State House of Assembly, Right Honourable Abdulaziz Garba Gafasa resigned on 14 December 2020 and Chidari was elected the Speaker of the House on 15 December 2020.
