= Lawal Husain =

Lawan Hussaini Dala

Majority Leader, Kano State House of Assembly
- Incumbent
- Assumed office June 13, 2023
- Appointed by: Speaker Jibril Ismail Falgore

Personal details
- Profession: Politician
- Website: Kano Assembly Profile

Hon. Lawal Husain (also known as Lawan Hussaini Dala or Lawan Hussaini Chediyar Yan Gurasa) is a Nigerian politician and legislator. He currently serves as the Majority Leader of the 10th Kano State House of Assembly, representing Dala Constituency under the New Nigeria Peoples Party (NNPP).

== Early life and background ==
Husain comes from Chediyar Yan Gurasa, a ward within the Dala Local Government Area of Kano State, Nigeria.

== Career ==
Husain has been a prominent figure in the Kano State legislature, serving consecutive terms in the House of Assembly.

9th Assembly (2019 – 2023)

During the 9th Kano State House of Assembly, Husain represented the Dala Constituency on the platform of the Peoples Democratic Party (PDP). As a member of the opposition at the time, he was an active voice in legislative deliberations.

10th Assembly (2023 – Present)

Following the 2023 general elections, he was re-elected to represent Dala Constituency, this time under the banner of the New Nigeria Peoples Party (NNPP). upon the inauguration of the 10th Assembly in June 2023, he was appointed as the Majority Leader by Speaker Jibril Ismail Falgore.

=== Legislative Achievements & Motions ===
As Majority Leader, Husain has sponsored and moved several high-profile motions and bills:

- Kano Emirate Council Reform: In May 2024, he sponsored the Kano State Emirates Council (Amendment No. 2) Law, 2024. He moved the urgent motion to repeal the 2019 law that had created five separate emirates, arguing that the division had "distorted" Kano's cultural heritage. The passage of this bill led to the dissolution of the five emirates (Bichi, Gaya, Karaye, Rano) and the reinstatement of the single Kano Emirate system.
- State Security Legislation: In February 2024, he played a key role in the passage of the bill establishing a state security outfit. He oversaw the review of controversial clauses, including those barring political party members from heading the agency.
- Judicial & Legislative Autonomy: He has been a proponent of financial autonomy for the state's legislative and judicial arms, moving motions to urge the state government to fully implement these constitutional provisions.
- Public Clarifications: In his leadership capacity, he serves as a primary spokesperson for the Assembly's legislative intent, often clarifying the House's position on investigations, for example in July 2025 refuting alleged probes into local government officials when no such mandate was given.
