= Abdullahi Tijjani Gwarzo =

Nigerian politician

Minister of State for Housing and Urban Development
- In office 2023–2024
- President: Bola Tinubu
- Succeeded by: Yusuf Abdullahi Ata

Personal details
- Born: 23 September 1960 (age 65)
- Party: All Progressives Congress
- Occupation: Politician

Abdullahi Tijjani Gwarzo (born 23 September 1960) is a Nigerian politician. He was the Minister of State for Housing and Urban Development.

In October 2024, He was succeeded by Yusuf Abdullahi Ata following President Bola Tinubu's cabinet reshuffle.
