= Kano State House of Assembly =

Legislative arm of a state government in Nigeria

Type
- Type: Unicameral

History
- Founded: 2 October 1979

Leadership
- Speaker: The Right Honourable Jibril Falgore
- Deputy Speaker: The Honourable Muhammad Bello Butu Butu
- Majority Leader: The Honourable Lawal Husain
- Minority Leader: The Honourable Usman Abubakar Tasi'u

Meeting place
- Audu Bako Secretariat, Kano

Kano State House of Assembly is the state legislature of Kano State, Nigeria. The Kano State House of Assembly is one of the arms of Kano State Government which comprises the Executives, Judiciary and the legislatives, House of Assembly are the legislatives of Kano State. The Chamber and the offices of the Members are located at Audu Bako Secretariat in the state capital, Kano Municipal. The House of Assembly is currently under the Leadership of New Nigerian Peoples Party (NNPP). There have been nine different house of assemblies; the first was inaugurated 2 October 1979 and the present one was inaugurated 7 June 2019. There are forty members of the State House of Assembly, that represent forty-four local government areas in Kano State.

== 10th Kano State House of Assembly members 2023-2027 ==
1. Hon. Lawal Tini, (NNPP) (Ajingi constituency)
2. Hon. Musa Tahir Haruna, (NNPP) (Albasu Constituency)
3. Hon. Ali Lawan Alhassan, (NNPP) (Bagwai/Shanono constituency)
4. Hon. Ali Muhammad Tiga, (NNPP) (Bebeji constituency)
5. Hon. Lawal Shehu, (APC) (Bichi constituency)
6. Hon. Hafiz Gambo, (NNPP) (Bunkure constituency)
7. Hon. Lawal Husain, majority leader (NNPP) (Dala constituency)
8. Hon. Murtala Musa Kore, (APC) (Danbatta constituency)
9. Hon. Rabiu Shuaibu, (NNPP) (Dawakin Kudu constituency)
10. Hon. Saleh Ahmad Marke, (APC) (Dawakin Tofa constituency)
11. Hon. Salisu Ibrahim Muhammad, (APC) (Doguwa constituency)
12. Hon. Tukur Mohammed, (NNPP) (Fagge constituency)
13. Hon. Zakariyya Abdullahi Nuhu, (NNPP) (Gabasawa constituency)
14. Hon. Murtala Muhammad Kadage, (NNPP) (Garko constituency)
15. Hon. Abubakar Danladi Isah, (APC) (Gaya constituency)
16. Hon. Abdullahi Yahya, (APC) (Gezawa constituency)
17. Hon. Abdulmajid Isah Umar, (NNPP) (Gwale constituency)
18. Hon. Yunusa Haruna Kayyu, (APC) (Gwarzo constituency)
19. Hon. Ayuba Labaran Alhassan, (APC) (Kabo constituency)
20. Hon. Sarki Aliyu Daneji, (NNPP) (Kano Municipal constituency)
21. Hon. Engr Ahmad Ibrahim, (NNPP) (Karaye constituency)
22. Hon. Garba Shehu Fammar, (NNPP) (Kibiya constituency)
23. Hon. Usman Abubakar Tasi'u, (NNPP) (Kiru constituency)
24. Hon. Mudassir Ibrahim, (NNPP) (Kumbotso constituency)
25. Hon. Garba Ya’u Gwarmai, (APC) (Tsanyawa/Ghari constituency)
26. Hon. Alhassan Zakari Ishaq, (NNPP) (Kura/Garun Malam constituency)
27. Hon. Suleiman Mukhtar Ishaq, (NNPP) (Madobi constituency)
28. Hon. Ahmad Muhammad, (APC) (Makoda constituency)
29. Hon. Abdul Abdulhamid, (NNPP) (Minjibir constituency)
30. Hon. Yusuf Bello Aliyu, (NNPP) (Nassarawa constituency)
31. Hon. Muhammad Ibrahim, (NNPP) (Rano constituency)
32. Hon. Muhammad Bello Butu-butu, Deputy Speaker (NNPP) (Rimin gado/Tofa constituency)
33. Rt. Hon Jibril Ismail Falgore, speaker (NNPP) (Rogo constituency)
34. Hon Zubairu Hamza Masu, (NNPP) (Sumaila constituency)
35. Hon. Musa Ali Kachako, (APC) (Takai constituency)
36. Hon. Kabiru Sule Dahiru, (NNPP) (Tarauni constituency)
37. Hon. Sule Lawal Shuwaki, (APC) (Tudun Wada constituency)
38. Hon. Aminu Sa’ad, (NNPP) (Ungogo constituency)
39. Hon. Labaran Abdul Madari, minority leader (APC) (Warawa constituency)
40. Hon. Ali Abdullahi Manager (NNPP) (Wudil constituency)

== 9th Kano State House of Assembly members 2019-2023 ==
1. Rt. Hon Hamisu Chidari Speaker (APC) (Makoda Constituency)
2. Hon. Labaran Abdul Madari Majority Leader (APC) (Warawa Constituency)
3. Hon. Ayuba Labaran Alhassan Chief Whip (APC) (Kabo Constituency)
4. Hon. Kabiru Hassan Dashi (APC) Deputy Majority Leader (Kiru Constituency)
5. Hon. Hayatu Musa Dorawar Sallau Deputy Whip (APC) (Kura/Garun Malam Constituency)
6. Hon. Isyaku Ali Danja Minority Leader (PDP) (Gezawa Constituency)
7. Hon. Garba Shehu Fammar Deputy Minority Leader (PDP) (Kibiya Constituency)
8. Hon. Muhammad Ballo Butu-Butu (APC) (Rimin Gado/Tofa Constituency)
9. Hon. Nuraddeen Alhassan Ahmad (APC) (Rano Constituency)
10. Hon. Jibril Isma'il Falgore (APC) (Rogo Constituency)
11. Hon. Tukur Muhammad (PDP) (Fagge Constituency)
12. Hon. Salisu Maje Ahmad Gwangwazo (PDP) (Municipal Constituency)
13. Hon. Lawal Rabi'u (PDP) (Tarauni Constituency)
14. Hon. Umar Musa Gama (PDP) (Nassarawa Constituency)
15. Hon. Aminu Saadu (PDP) (Ungoggo Constituency)
16. Hon. Lawal Hussain (PDP) (Dala Constituency)
17. Hon. Abdul’aziz Garba Gafasa (APC) (Ajingi Constituency)
18. Hon. Yusuf Babangida Suleiman (PDP) (Gwale Constituency)
19. Hon. Mudassir Ibrahim (PDP) (Kumbotso Constituency)
20. Hon. Muhammad Elyakub (APC) (Dawaki Kudu Constituency)
21. Hon. Kabiru Yusuf Isma'il (APC) (Madobi Constituency)
22. Hon. Tasi’u Ibrahim Zabainawa (APC) (Minjibir Constituency)
23. Hon. Muhammad Dan’azumi (APC) (Gabawa Constituency)
24. Hon. Saleh Ahmed Marke (APC) (Dawaki Tofa Constituency)
25. Hon. Nuhu Abdullahi Achika (APC) (Wudil Constituency)
26. Hon. Nasiru Abdullahi Dutsen Amare (APC) (Karaye Constituency)
27. Hon. Abubakar Danladi Isah (APC) (Gaya Constituency)
28. Hon. Abba Ibrahim Garko (APC) (Garko Constituency)
29. Hon. Zubairu Hamza Masu (APC) (Sumaila Constituency)
30. Hon. Musa Ali Kachako (APC) (Takai Constituency)
31. Hon. Sunusi Usman Bataiya (APC) (Albasu Constituency)
32. Hon. Garba Ya’u Gwarmai (APC) (Kunchi/Tsanyawa Constituency)
33. Hon. Abdullahi Iliyasu Yaryasa (APC) (Tudun Wada Constituency)
34. Hon. Lawal Shehu (APC) (Bichi Constituency)
35. Hon. Abubakar U. Galadima (APC) (Bebeji Constituency)
36. Hon. Ali Ibrahim Isah Shanono (APC) (Bagwai/Shanono Constituency)
37. Hon. Muhammad Uba Gurjiya (APC) (Bunkure Constituency)
38. Hon. Salisu Ibrahim Muhammad (APC) (Doguwa Constituency)
39. Hon. Murtala Musa Kore (APC) (Dambatta Constituency)
40. Hon. Yunusa Haruna Kayyu (APC) (Gwarzo Constituency)

== 8th Kano State House of Assembly members 2015-2019 ==
1. Rt. Hon. Kabiru Alhassan Rurum (APC) Speaker (Rano Constituency)
2. Hon. Hamisu Chidari Deputy Speaker (APC) (Makoda Constituency)
3. Hon. Baffa Babba Danagundi (APC) Majority Leader (Municipal Constituency)
4. Hon. Kabiru Hassan Dashi (APC) Deputy Majority Leader (Kiru Constituency)
5. Hon. Labaran Abdul Madari Chief Whip (APC) (Warawa Constituency)
6. Hon. Ayuba Labaran Alhassan Majority Whip (APC) (Kabo Constituency)
7. Hon. Abdullahi Muhammad (PDP) Minority Leader (Kura/Garum Malam Constituency)
8. Hon. Yusuf Abdullahi Ata (APC) (Fagge Constituency)
9. Hon. Isyaku Ali Danja (PDP) (Gezawa Constituency)
10. Hon. Yusuf Abdullahi Falgore (PDP) (Rogo Constituency)
11. Hon. Abdul'aziz Garba Gafasa (APC) (Ajingi Constituency)
12. Hon. Abubakar Zakari Muhahammad (APC) (Tarauni Constituency)
13. Hon. Ibrahim Ahmad Gama (APC) (Nassarawa Constituency)
14. Hon. Tasi'u Rabi'u Panshekara (APC) (Ungoggo Constituency)
15. Hon. Babangida Alhassan Yusuf (APC) (Dala Constituency)
16. Hon. Yusuf Babangida Suleiman (APC) (Gwale Constituency)
17. Hon. Naziru Zakari Sheka (APC) (Kumbotso Constituency)
18. Hon. Ibrahim M. Dawakiji (APC) (Dawaki Kudu Constituency)
19. Hon. Zubair Mahmuda (PDP) (Madobi Constituency)
20. Hon. Tasi'u Ibrahim Zabainawa (APC) (Minjibir Constituency)
21. Hon. Muhammad Dan'azumi (APC) (Gabasawa Constituency)
22. Hon. Saleh Ahmed Marke (APC) (Dawaki Tofa Constituency)
23. Hon. Muhammad Ballo Butu-Butu (APC) (Rimin Gado/Tofa Constituency)
24. Hon. Nasiru Abdullahi Dutsen Amare (APC) (Karaye Constituency)
25. Hon. Suyudi Mahmuda Kademi (APC) (Gaya Constituency)
26. Hon. Abba Ibrahim Garko (APC) (Garko Constituency)
27. Hon. Zubairu Hamza Masu (APC) (Sumaila Constituency)
28. Hon. Musa Ali Kachako (APC) (Takai Constituency)
29. Hon. Sunusi Usman Bataiya (APC) (Albasu Constituency)
30. Hon. Nuhu Abdullahi Achika (APC) (Wudil Constituency)
31. Hon. Garba Ya'u Gwarmai (APC) (Kunchi/Tsanyawa Constituency)
32. Hon. Abdullahi Iliyasu Yaryasa (APC) (Tudun Wada Constituency)
33. Hon. Hamza S. Bichi (PDP) (Bichi Constituency)
34. Hon. Abubakar U. Galadima (APC) (Bebeji Constituency)
35. Hon. Ali Ibrahim Isah Shanono (APC) (Bagwai/Shanono Constituency)
36. Hon. Muhammad Uba Gurjiya (APC) (Bunkure Constituency)
37. Hon. Salisu Ibrahim Muhammad (APC) (Doguwa Constituency)
38. Hon. Hafizu Sani Maifada (APC) (Dambatta Constituency)
39. Hon. Rabi'u Saleh Gwarzo (PDP) (Gwarzo Constituency)
40. Hon. Maifada Bello Kibiya (APC) (Kibiya Constituency)

== See also ==
- Standards Organisation of Nigeria
- Yahuza Ado
- All Progressives Congress
- Peoples Democratic Party (Nigeria)
- Rabiu Kwankwaso
- Politics of Nigeria
