= Audu Bako Secretariat =

Government office complex

- Interactive map of the Audu Bako Secretariat area
- Etymology: Named after Audu Bako, the first Governor of Kano State

General information
- Status: Active
- Location: Kano, Kano State, Nigeria
- Coordinates: 12.0000°N 8.5167°E
- Completed: 1975
- Owner: Kano State Government

Audu Bako Secretariat is a government office complex located in the heart of Kano the capital of Kano State in Northern Nigeria. The complex is named after Alhaji Muhammadu Audu Bako, a prominent politician and leader in the region who served as the Minister of Internal Affairs in Nigeria's First Republic.

The secretariat is a major hub of administrative activities in Kano State, housing several government agencies and departments responsible for the governance and development of the state. These include the Kano State Ministry of Finance, the Kano State Ministry of Justice, the Kano State Ministry of Planning and Budget, the State Head of Service's office, and the State Accountant General's office.

Audu Bako Secretariat is strategically located in the Central Business District of Kano city, making it easily accessible to residents, government officials, and visitors alike. The complex is a sprawling multi-story building with modern architectural designs and facilities that meet international standards.

One of the key advantages of the secretariat is its centralized location, which enables government officials to easily coordinate and collaborate with one another, leading to more efficient and effective service delivery to the people of Kano State.
