= Jibril Falgore =

Nigerian politician

Jibril Ismail Falgore

Speaker of the Kano State House of Assembly

Member of the Kano State House of Assembly
- Constituency: Rogo Constituency

Personal details
- Born: Kano State, Nigeria
- Party: New Nigeria People's Party (NNPP)
- Occupation: Politician

Jibril Ismail Falgore is a Nigerian politician who has served as the Speaker of the Kano State House of Assembly since 13 June 2023. He represents the Rogo Constituency in the assembly. He was elected Speaker at the beginning of the 10th Kano State House of Assembly..

== Early life ==
Falgore was born in Falgore town, in Rogo Local Government Area of Kano State, Nigeria.

== Political career ==
Falgore was elected to the Kano State House of Assembly to represent Rogo Constituency in the 2023 Kano State House of Assembly election. He contested on the platform of the New Nigeria People's Party (NNPP).

On 13 June 2023, he was elected Speaker of the 10th Kano State House of Assembly.

In January 2026, Falgore left the NNPP and joined the All Progressives Congress (APC).
