= Yusuf Abdullahi Ata =

Nigerian politician, economist and teacher (born 1962)

Speaker of the Kano State House of Assembly
- In office 3 July 2017 – 30 July 2018
- Preceded by: Kabiru Alhassan Rurum
- Succeeded by: Kabiru Alhassan Rurum

Minister of State, Housing and Urban Development
- Incumbent
- Assumed office October 2024

Majority Leader in the Kano State House of Assembly
- In office 29 May 2015 – 3 July 2017
- Preceded by: Kabiru Alhassan Rurum
- Succeeded by: Abdulaziz Garba Gafasa

Personal details
- Born: 22 June 1962 (age 64) Fagge, Nigeria
- Party: All Progressive Congress (APC)
- Other political affiliations: PDP (1999–2010)
- Education: Bayero University
- Occupation: Politics
- Profession: Teacher, politician, economist
- Website: https://kanoassembly.gov.ng/yusuf-abdullahi-ata/

Yusuf Abdullahi Ata (born 22 June 1962) is a Nigerian politician, economist and teacher from Kano state who served as speaker in Kano State House of Assembly between 2017 and 2018. He currently serves as the Minister of State, Housing and Urban Development.

== Early life and education ==
Ata was born on 22 June 1962 in Fagge Local Government Area of Kano State. He attended Fagge Primary School between 1968 and 1975, then attended Aminu Kano Community Commercial College between 1975 and 1980. Ata obtained Bachelor of Science in Economics and Masters in Development Studies from Bayero University, Kano (BUK) in the year of 1984 and 2001 respectively.

== Career ==
Ata started his career as a classroom teacher, in the year of 1992 Ata was transfer to Kano State Ministry of Education and served as inspector in Business Education. In 1997, he was also transfer to Kano State Housing Cooperation as a Principal Planning Officer and server for one year he resigned from civil service and joined politics in 1998.

== Politics ==
Ata was first elected as Member Kano State House of Assembly to represent Fagge constituency in 1999 Nigerian General Election under Platform of Peoples Democratic Party (PDP). During the 2003 Nigerian General Election Ata lost his seat in the House and he also recontest in 2011 Nigerian General Election were won the election and also won in the 2015 Nigerian general election, for the third term, he was nominated the Majority Leader of Kano State House of Assembly in 2015.

Ata became Speaker Kano State House of Assembly as the result of Kabiru Alhassan Rurum resignation due to the allegation against him, After several attempt to impeached Ata by Kabiru Alhassan Rurum Group they were succeeded on Monday 30 July 2018, 27 Members out of the 40 Members of House impeached him, based on the claim that he cannot run the affairs of the House, the motion was raised by Labaran Abdul Madari Member Representing Warawa Constituency and second by Abdullahi Chiromawa Member Representing Kura/Garum Mallam Constituency and replaced by his predecessor Kabiru Alhassan Rurum. Ata was defeated in the 2019 Nigerian General Election by Tukur Muhammad of Peoples Democratic Party (PDP).
