= Yusuf Babangida Suleiman =

Nigerian politician

Personal details
- Born: 28 April 1976 (age 50) Gwale
- Party: Peoples Democratic Party (PDP)
- Other political affiliations: All Progressive Congress (APC)
- Relations: Married
- Education: York St John University; University of California; Bayero University, Kano
- Occupation: Politician
- Profession: Lawmaker
- Website: Yusuf Babangida on Kano State House of Assembly

Yusuf Babangida Suleiman (born 28 April 1976), more commonly known as Yusuf Dawo-dawo, is a Nigerian politician and a lawmaker from Kano State member of the 7th, 8th and 9th Kano State House of Assembly.

== Early life and education ==
Yusuf was born on 28 April 1976 in Gwale Local Government Area of Kano State he attended Kurmawa Primary School between 1983 and 1989, He also attended Government Secondary School Warure and he proceeded to Aminu Kano Commercial College between 1992 and 1995.

He attended Bayero University, Kano, York St John University, and University of California, Yusuf Obtained Advance Diploma in Computer Science at Informatic Kazaure, Jigawa State.

== Politics ==
Yusuf was elected as a Member of Kano State House of Assembly in 2011 Nigerian general election and retained the seat for over two consecutive elections in 2015, and 2019, and is currently serving his third term.
