= Kano Road Traffic Agency =

Government agency of Kano State, Nigeria

Kano Road And Traffic Agency
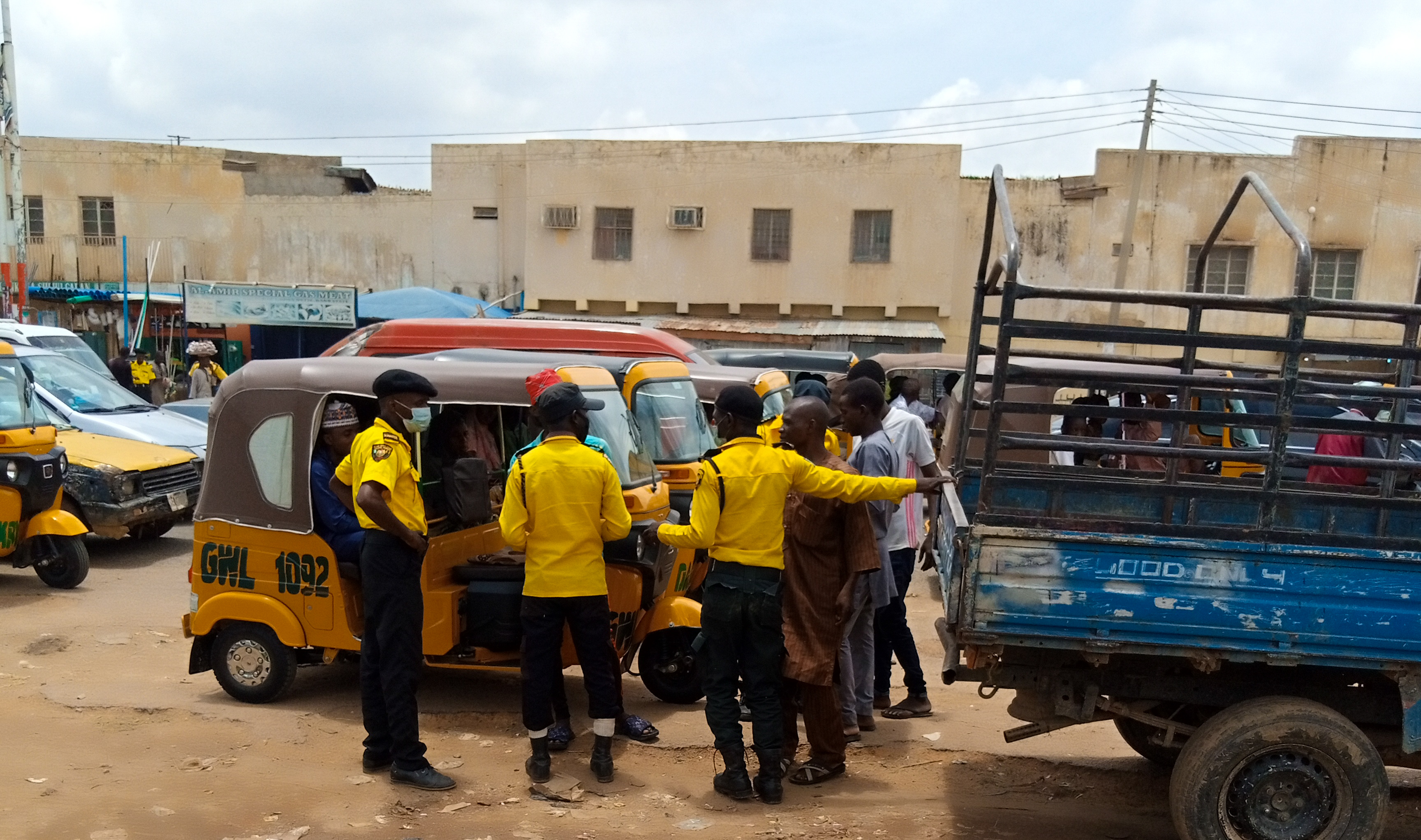
- KAROTA personnel at duty
- Abbreviation: KAROTA
- Formation: 2012
- Legal status: Active
- Purpose: Road traffic control
- Headquarters: Club Road, Kano
- Location: Kano State
- Region served: Kano
- Official language: English
- Managing Director: Engr. Faisal Mahmud Kabir
- Staff: 2800
- Volunteers: none
- Website: karota.ng

Kano Road Traffic Agency (KAROTA) is a government agency responsible for traffic management and control, road safety, and other related matters within Kano State. The agency was established in 2012 with the mandate of ensuring safety on the roads, reducing accidents, and ensuring the free flow of traffic. KAROTA operates in collaboration with other law enforcement agencies such as the Nigeria Police Force and the Federal Road Safety Corps (FRSC) to maintain law and order on the roads.

== History ==
The Kano Road And Traffic Agency (KAROTA) is a traffic management agency which was established by former Governor of Kano State, Rabiu Kwankwaso in 2012 in order to sanitize the roads by ensuring road users in Kano state upheld the law.

== Responsibilities ==
Some of the specific responsibilities of KAROTA include:

- Ensuring compliance with traffic rules and regulations
- Issuing and renewing driver's licenses and vehicle registration
- Conducting road safety campaigns and awareness programs
- Managing traffic flow and congestion on the roads
- Providing towing services for broken-down or abandoned vehicles
- Enforcing traffic rules and regulations through the use of mobile courts.
