= A237 highway (Nigeria) =

Road in Nigeria

Coordinates: 11.54182°N 9.26949°E

Trunk Road A237

Location
- Country: Nigeria

Highway system
- Transport in Nigeria

The A237 highway is a highway in Nigeria. It is one of the East-West roads linking the main south-north roads. (It is named from the two highways it links).

It runs from the A2 highway at Kano to the A3 highway at Kari, Borno state north of Darazo, Bauchi State. some important towns along the road are Kari (Borno state), Darazo (Bauchi state), Gwaram, Birnin Kudu (Jigawa state), Takai, Wudil, Ladin makole and Mariri (Kano state).
