= Makoda =

- LGA and town
- Interactive map of Makoda
- Location in Nigeria
- Coordinates: 12.4186°N 8.4325°E
- Country: Nigeria
- State: Kano State
- Headquarter: Koguna

Area
  - Total: 441 km^{2} (170 sq mi)

Population (2006 census)
  - Total: 222,399
  - Density: 504.3/km^{2} (1,306/sq mi)
  - Religions: Christianity and Islam
- Time zone: UTC+1 (WAT)
- 3-digit postal code prefix: 702
- ISO 3166 code: NG.KN.MK

Makoda is a town and local government area in Kano State, Nigeria. Its headquarters are in the town of Koguna. It was carved out of Danbatta local government area.

It has an area of 441 km^{2} and had a population of 222,399 in the 2006 census.

The postal code of the area is 702.

== Geography ==
Makoda Local Government Area has an average temperature of 33 degrees Celsius or 91 degrees Fahrenheit and a total area of 441 square kilometres or 170 square miles. The average annual rainfall and average wind speed in Makoda Local Government Area are estimated to be 1,100 mm (43 in) and 11 km/h (6.8 mph), respectively.

== Religion ==
The two main religions that are practiced in Makoda are Islam and Christianity.

== Economy ==
The primary source of income for the residents of Makoda Local Government Area is farming, with a variety of commodities grown in considerable amounts there, including rice and tomatoes and cassava farming. Makoda Local Government Area has a thriving trade sector as well, with multiple marketplaces, including the Sabon Ruwa Central market, located there. The raising of livestock, hunting, and craft-making are among the other significant jobs held by residents of Makoda Local Government Area.
