= Warawa =

Warawa Ƙaramar hukumar Warawa
- LGA and town
- Interactive map of Warawa
- Location in Nigeria
- Coordinates: 11°53′N 8°41′E
- Country: Nigeria
- State: Kano State

Government
  - Interim manager of the local government: Lamido ahmad garindau
  - Secretary: Yusuf nabahani

Area
  - Total: 360 km^{2} (140 sq mi)

Population (2006 census)
  - Total: 128,787
  - Density: 360/km^{2} (930/sq mi)
  - Ethnicities: Hausa (Majority) and Fulani (Minority)
  - Religions: Islam; Christian (minority)
- Time zone: UTC+1 (WAT)
- 3-digit postal code prefix: 713
- ISO 3166 code: NG.KN.WA

Warawa is a town and Local Government Area in Kano State, Nigeria on the A237 highway. It was created out of Dawakin Kudu Local Government in the early 90s.

Kannywood comedian/actor Rabilu Musa (Ibro) was from the local government.

The council is led by a chairman who is the executive head of the local government. The Warawa legislative council make laws governing Warawa local government area. It consists of 15 Councillors representing the 15 wards of the local government area. The 15 wards of Warawa local government area are:

- Yan dalla
- Yangizo
- Amarawa
- Danlasan
- Garin Dau
- Gogel
- Imawa
- J/Galadima
- Jemagu
- Jigawa
- Katarkawa
- Madari Mata
- Tamburawar Gabas
- Tangar
- Warawa

It has an area of 360 km^{2} and a population of 128,787 at the 2006 census.

The postal code of the area is 713.

== Geography ==
Warawa Local Government Area has an average temperature of 34 degrees Celsius or 93 degrees Fahrenheit and a total area of 360 square kilometres or 140 square miles. The Local Government Area experiences two distinct seasons: the rainy and the dry, with an average wind speed of nine kilometres per hour or 5.5 miles per hour in the region.

=== Climate ===
Warawa local government Area experiences a rainy season that is oppressive and primarily cloudy, a dry season that is partly cloudy, and year-round high temperatures. The temperature rarely falls below 9 °C (48 °F) or rises over 41 °C (106 °F) throughout the year, often ranging from 12 °C (54 °F) to 39 °C (102 °F). With an average daily high temperature above 37 °C (99 °F), the hot season spans 2.2 months, from March 16 to May 23. At an average high temperature of 37 °C (99 °F) and low temperature of 24 °C (75 °F), May is the hottest month of the year in Warawa. With an average daily maximum temperature below 32 °C (89 °F), the chilly season spans 1.8 months, from December 3 to January 28. January is the coldest month of the year in Warawa, with an average high temperature of 31 °C (88 °F) and low temperature of 13 °C (55 °F).

== Religion ==
The two main religions in Warawa local government area are Islam and Christianity.
