= Federal College of Education, Kano =

Coordinates: 11.986°N 8.485°E

Federal University of Education Kano
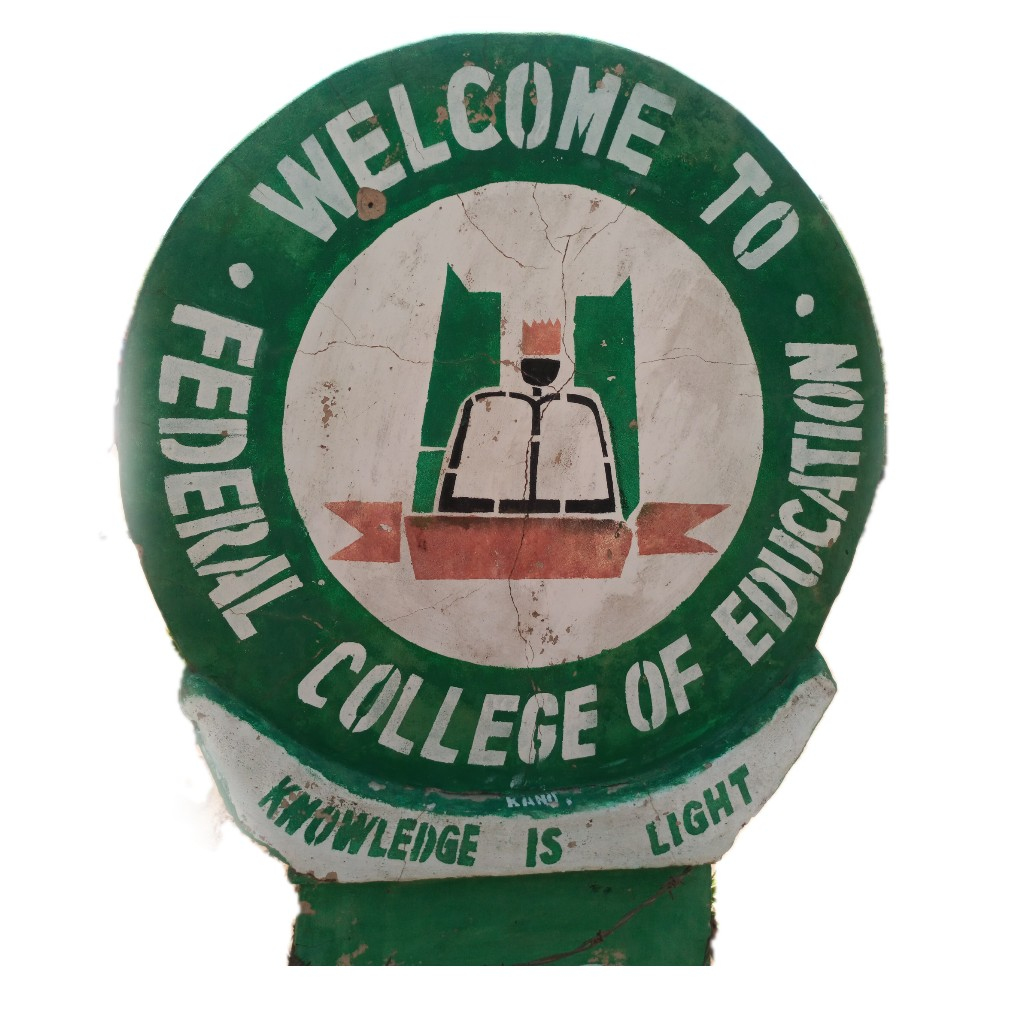
- Former names: Advance Training College Kano
- Type: University of Education
- Established: 1965
- Location: Nigeria
- Campus: Urban
- Website: https://fcekano.edu.ng/

Yusuf Maitama Sule Federal University of Education, Kano is a college of arts and sciences based in Kano State, Nigeria. It was established by the Northern Region Government of Nigeria in collaboration with United States Agency for International Development (USAID) in 1965 as Advance Training College Kano. It was renamed from the Federal University of Education to the Yusuf Maitama Sule Federal University of Education in 2025.

== History ==
In the year 1990 the Federal Government of Nigeria took over the college and renamed the college to Federal College of Education (FCE). In September 2014, Boko Haram attacked the college, resulting in the death of 10 faculty, staff and students.

== Schools ==
The institution offers part-time and full time studies in various departments under the following Schools;

1. School of Art and Social Sciences
2. School of Education
3. School of Languages
4. School of Sciences
5. School of Vocational Education
6. School of Early Childhood & ECCE
