= Kano State =

State of Nigeria

Kano State Jihar Kano جِهَرْ كَنُوْ (Hausa)
- State
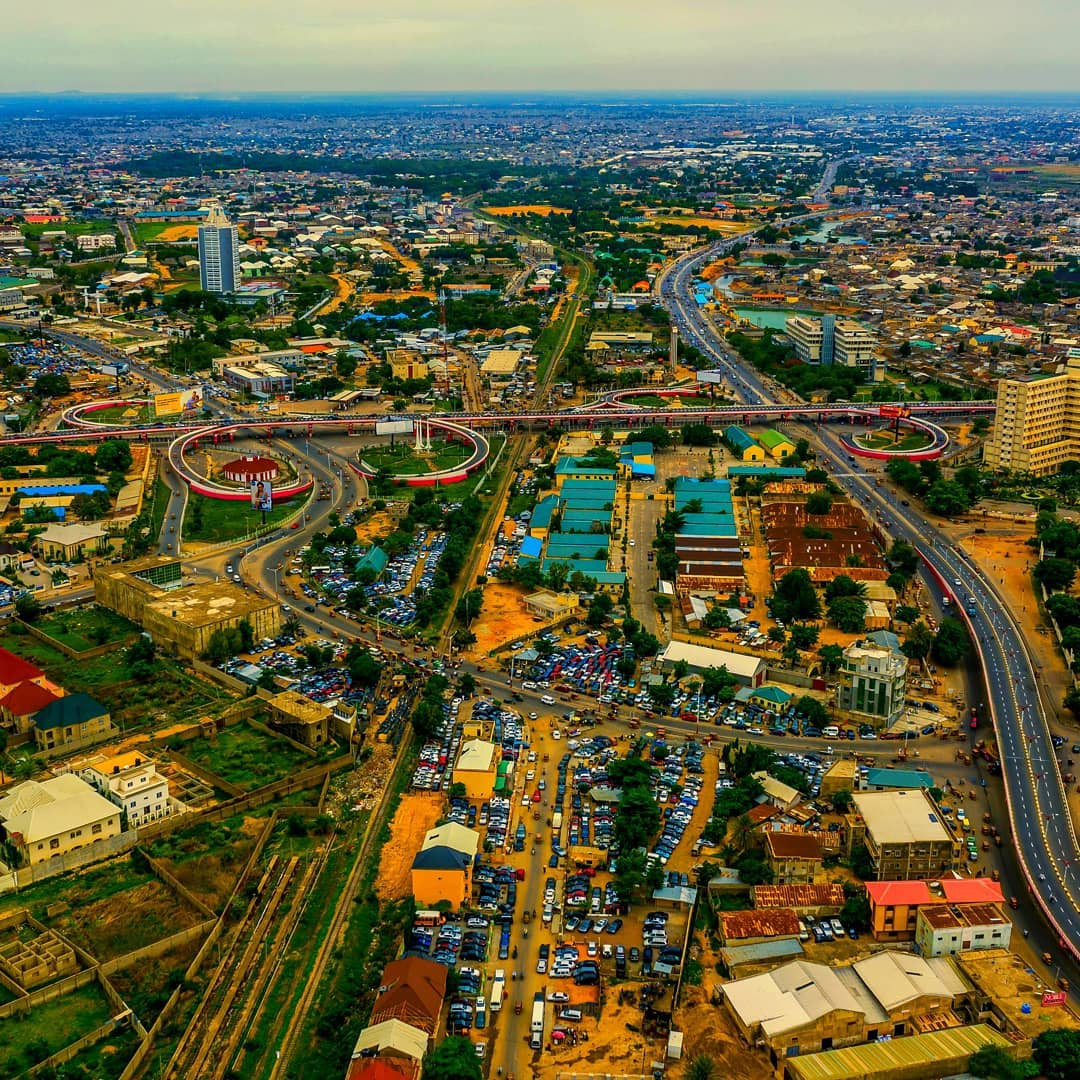
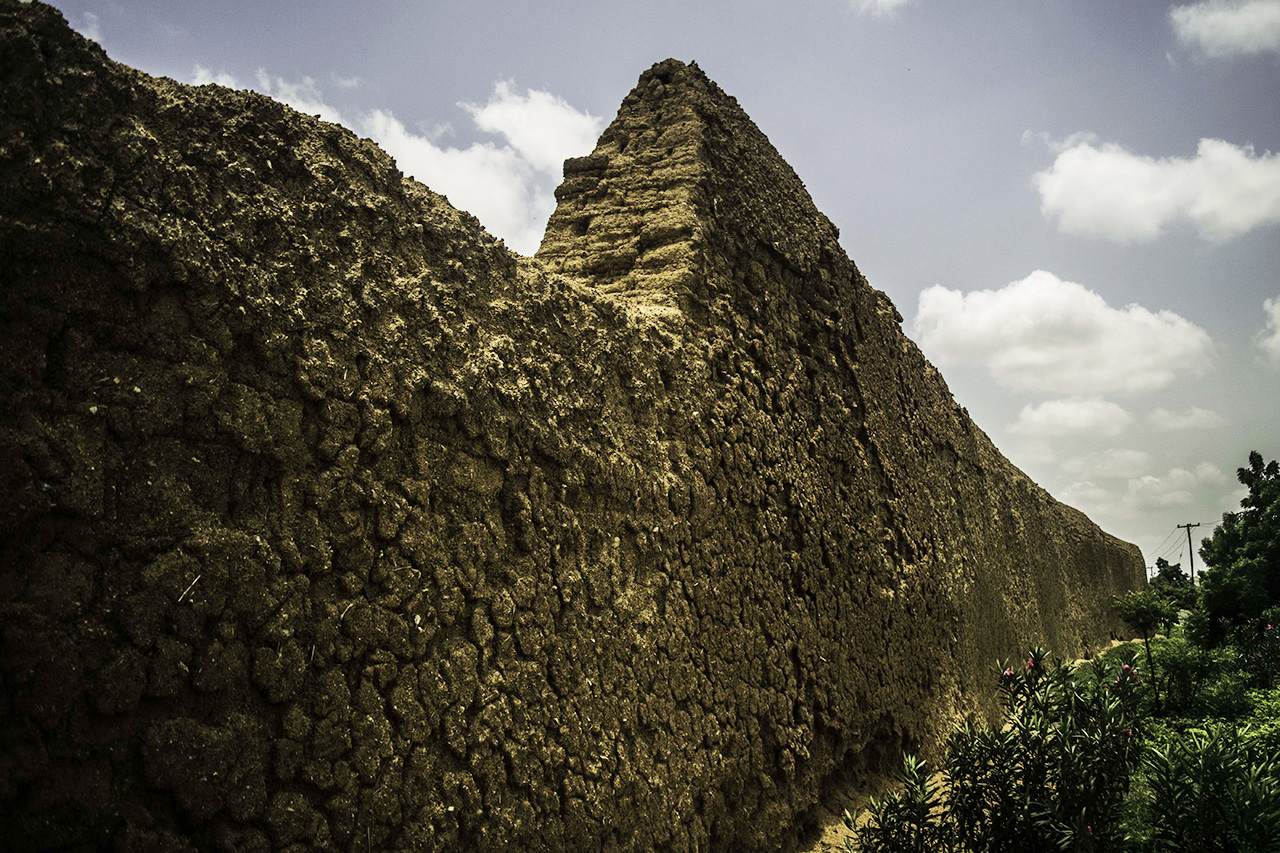
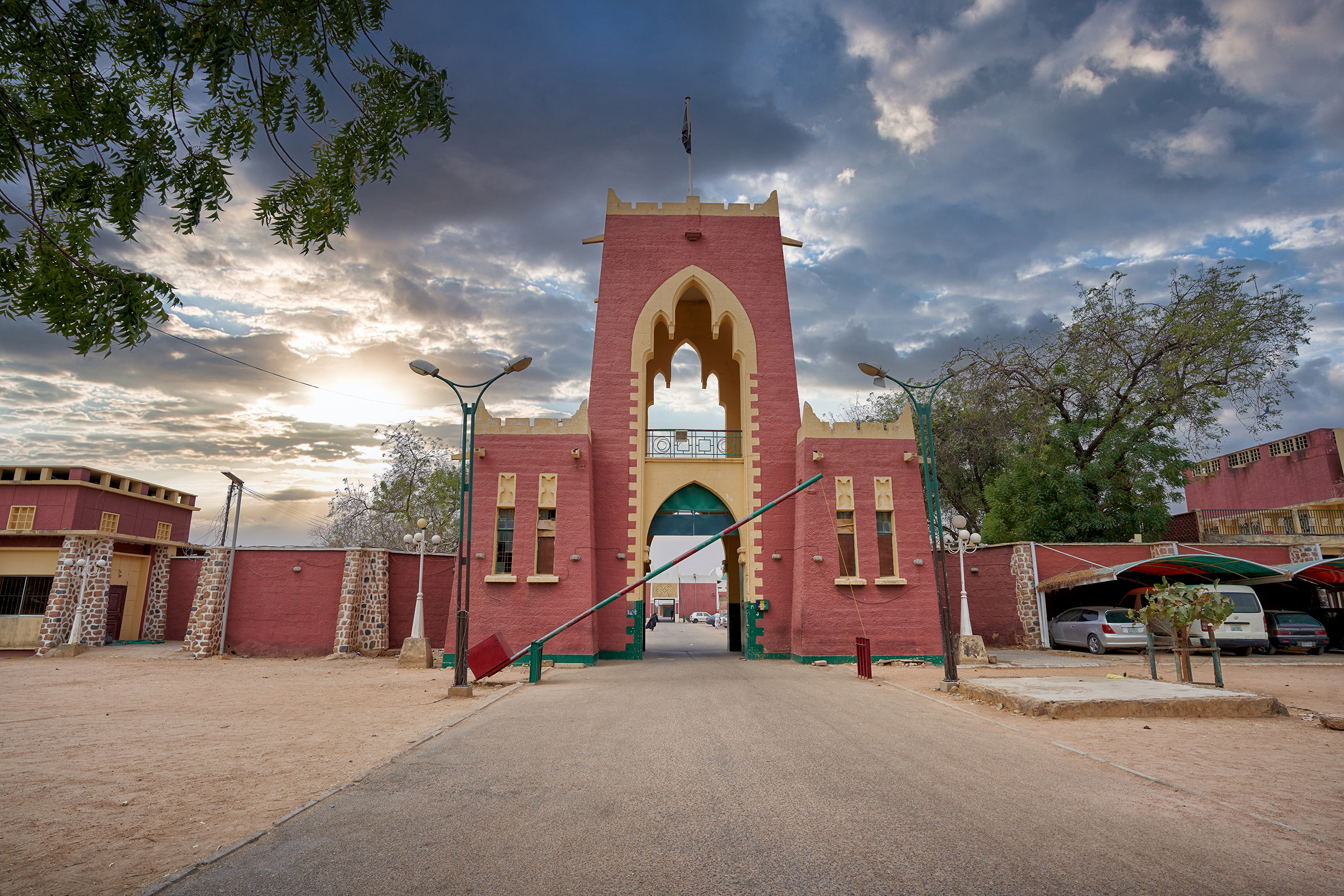
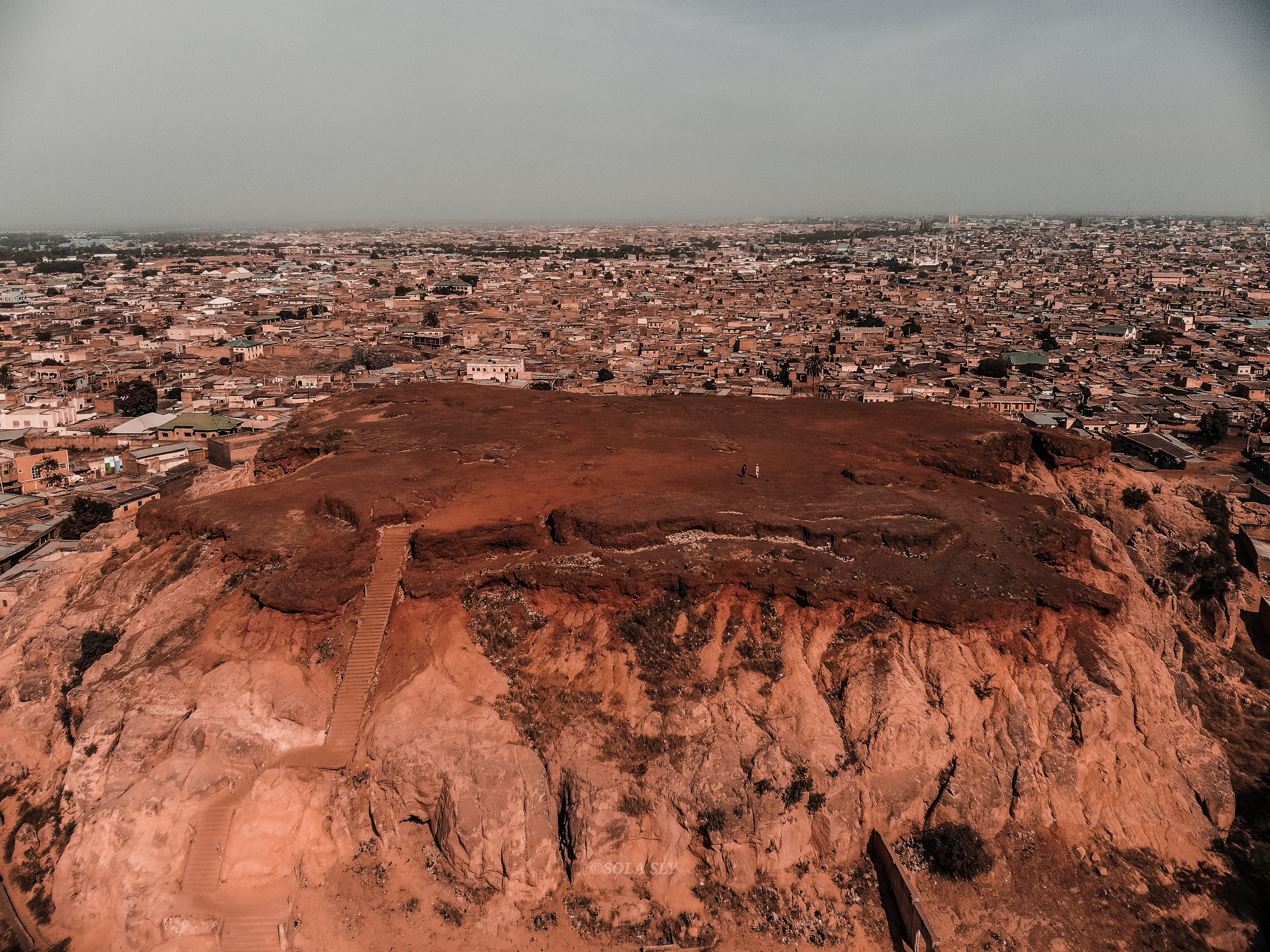
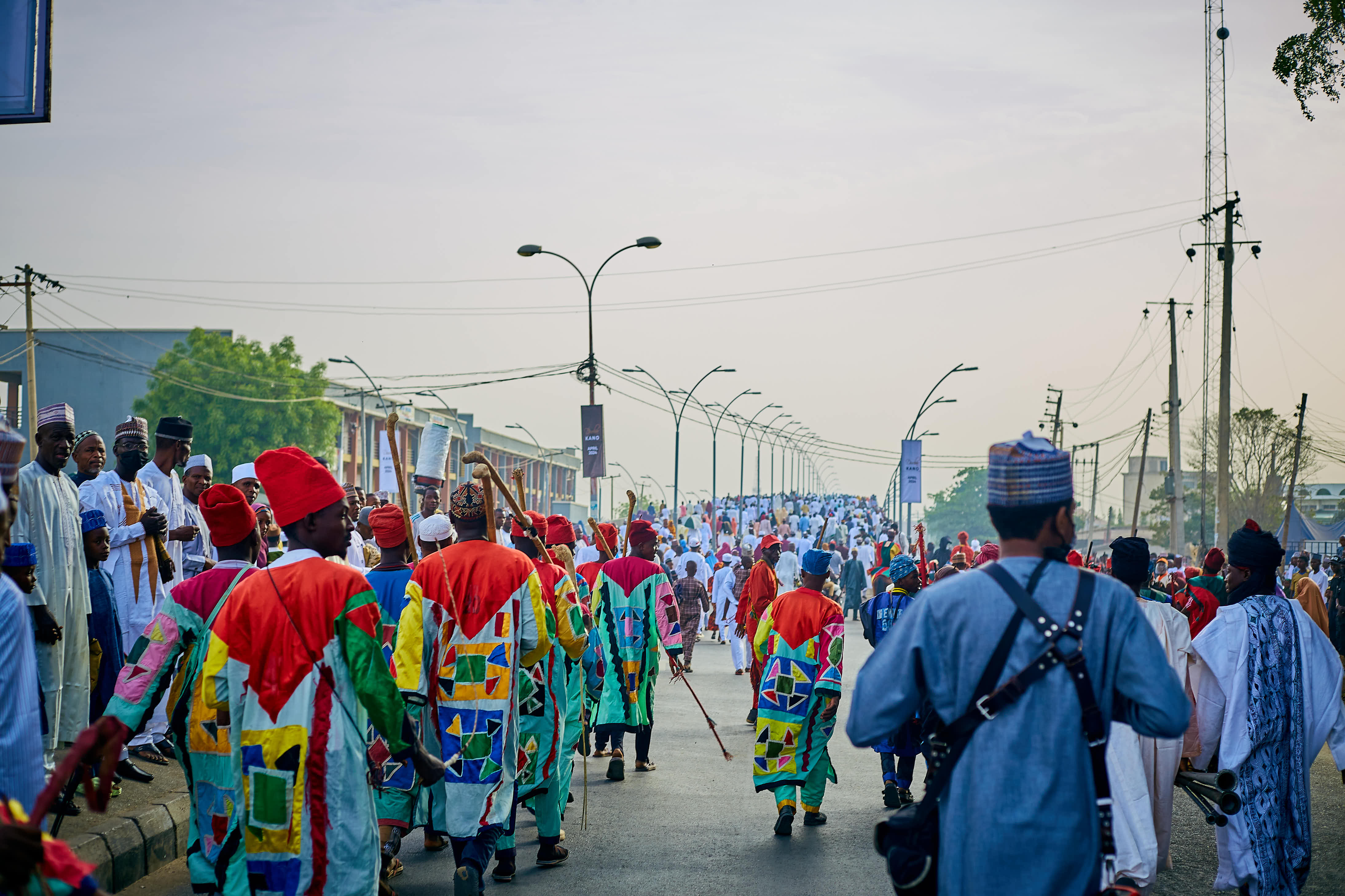
- Aerial view of Kano, the capital city Kano city walls Gidan Rumfa Dalla Hill Durbar festival in Kano

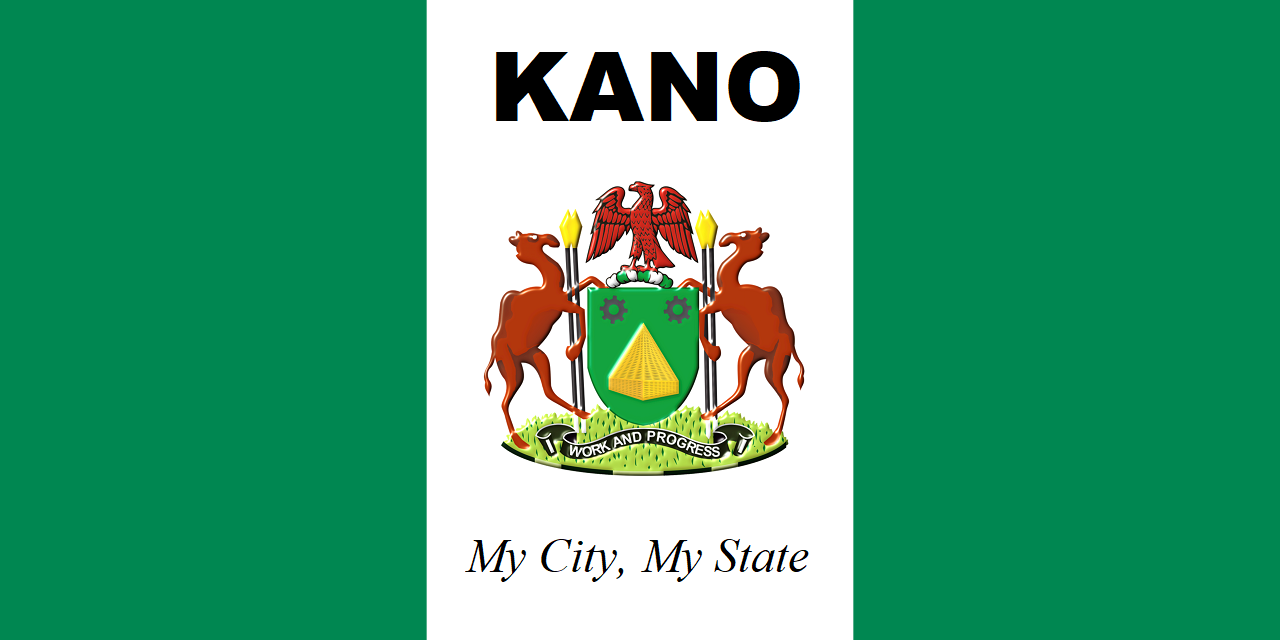
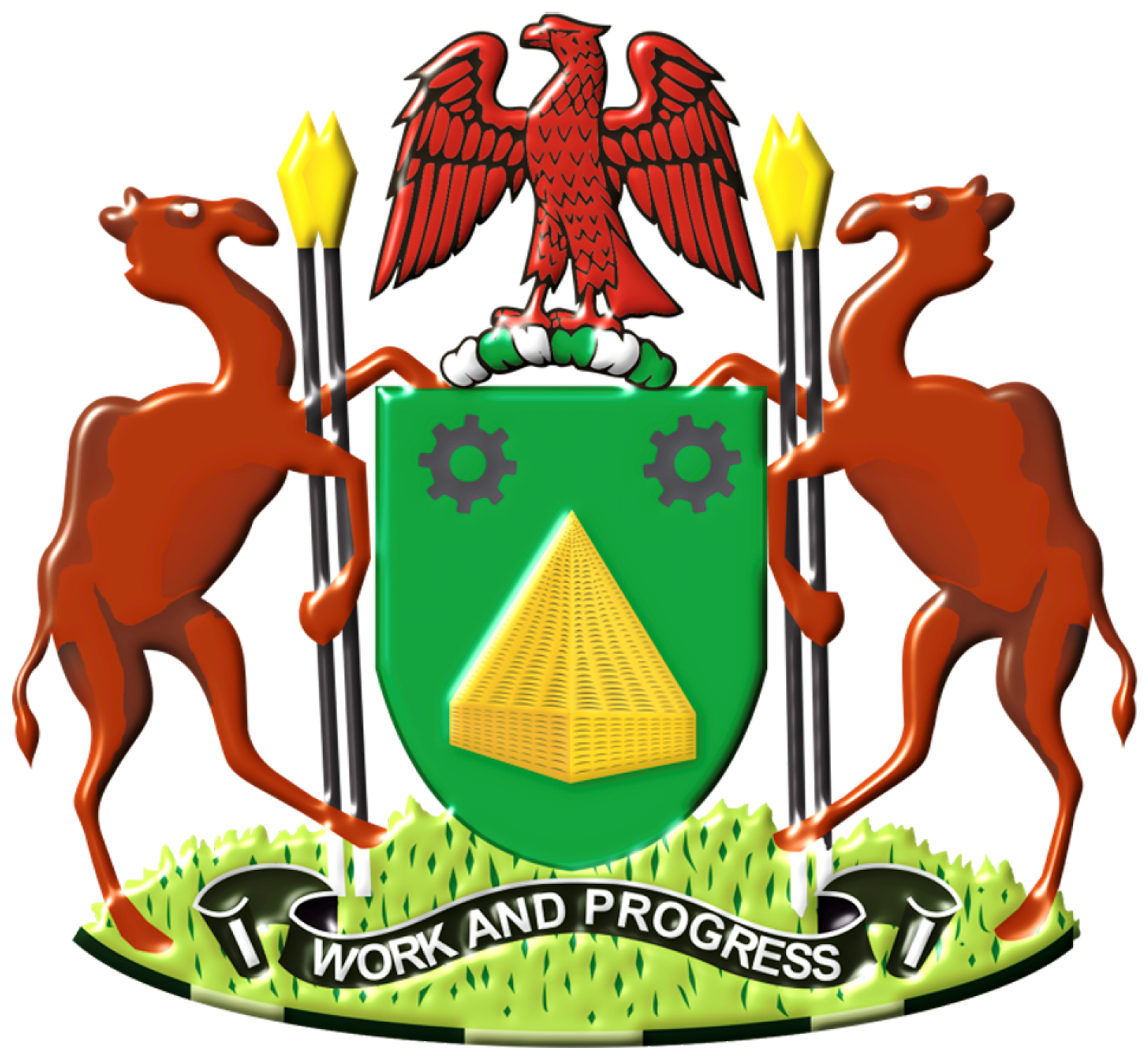
- Flag Seal
- Nicknames: Centre of Commerce, Tumbin Giwa
- Location of Kano State in Nigeria
- Coordinates: 11°30′N 8°30′E
- Country: Nigeria
- LGAs: 44
- Date created: 27 May 1967
- Capital: Kano

Government
  - Body: Government of Kano State
  - Governor: Abba Kabir Yusuf (APC)
  - Deputy Governor: Murtala Sule Garo (APC)
  - Legislature: Kano State House of Assembly
  - Senators: C: Rufai Hanga (NDC); N: Barau Jibrin (APC); S: Kawu Sumaila (APC)
  - Representatives: List

Area
  - Total: 20,131 km^{2} (7,773 sq mi)
  - Rank: 20th of 36

Population (2006 census)
  - Total: 9,401,288
  - Estimate (2026): 17,280,113
  - Rank: 1st/2nd of 36
  - Density: 467.01/km^{2} (1,209.5/sq mi)

GDP (PPP)
  - Year: 2021
  - Total: $27.17 billion 13th of 36
  - Per capita: $1,761; 36th of 36
- Time zone: UTC+01 (WAT)
- postal code: 700001
- ISO 3166 code: NG-KN
- HDI (2022): 0.482 low · 28th of 37
- Website: www.kanostate.gov.ng

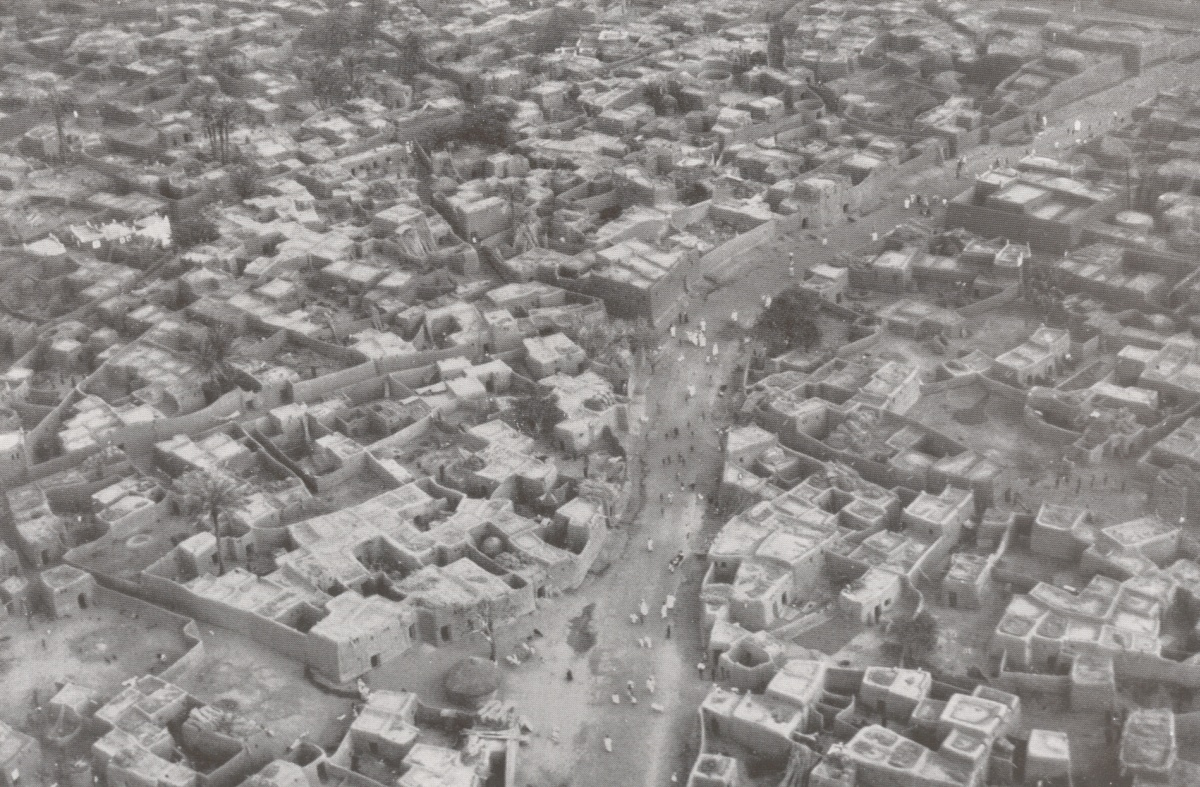
Kano city in December 1930

Kano State (Hausa: Jihar Kano جِهَرْ كَنُوَ), one of the 36 states of Nigeria, is in the north of the country. In the 2006 national census, Kano State was the most populous state in Nigeria. Created in 1967 from the former Northern Region, Kano State shares borders with Katsina State on the northwest, Jigawa State on the northeast, Bauchi State on the southeast, and Kaduna State on the southwest. The state capital is Kano, Nigeria's largest city after Lagos. Its governor is Abba Kabir Yusuf, who was sworn in on 29 May 2023.

Two major ethnic groups, the Hausa and Fulani, make up most of Kano State's population. Like most parts of northern Nigeria, Hausa is the state's dominant language. Kano State has faced attacks by the Islamist terrorist group Boko Haram, inter-religious violence, and extreme poverty. The state observes Sharia law within the legal framework of the Nigerian constitution.

== History ==
Kano State was the site of a number of kingdoms and empires which included the Kingdom of Kano, centred on Dalla Hill (Hausa: Dutsen Dala) from to 1000 to 1349 CE. In 1349, the Sultanate of Kano was established when Yaji I converted to Islam and became its first sultan. Kurmi Market, which opened in 1463, helped the city of Kano become a centre of commercial activity in Hausaland. The market remains open, and its historic importance is reflected in the state's nickname: Centre of Commerce.

During the 16th and 17th centuries, the Sultanate of Kano became one of the most powerful Hausa Kingdoms. After the 1804–1808 Fulani jihad, the Kano Emirate replaced the former sultanate. Emir Ibrahim Dabo made a number of administrative reforms to increase commerce in the region. Leaders encouraged traders to move from Katsina, capitalising on raids from the Hausa Sultanate of Maradi.

The British Empire conquered the Kano Emirate in 1903, incorporating it into the Northern Nigeria Protectorate. The major ethnic groups in pre-colonial Kano were the Hausa, Fulani, Barebari (Kanuri), Tuareg, Arabs, and Nupe. Most people in Kano speak Hausa as a first language, and some identify as ethnically Hausa.

Kano State has a diverse economy, establishing itself as a centre of industry, agriculture, and Islamic banking. The state was created on 27 May 1967, and part of it became Jigawa State in 1991.

== Geography ==
=== Climate ===
The rainfall in Kano State varies, with drought and near-drought conditions during the 1970s and 1980s. Moisture conditions improved from the 1990s to 2015, but rainfall still fluctuated. Since 2015, there has been an increase in rainfall. According to a Nigerian Meteorological Agency (NIMET) report, rainfall averages 897.7 mm (35.34 in).

NIMET issued a flood warning for some states, including Kano, during the first quarter of 2022. Their warning was based on the amount and distribution of nationwide rainfall during the rainy season. According to the Kano State Emergency Management Agency (SEMA), 25 local government districts experienced flooding.

==== Temperature ====
Kano's temperature has risen significantly since the 1960s. The state's annual diurnal temperature is between 26 and 30 °C (79 and 86 °F), and humidity ranges from 17 to 90 percent.

== Economy ==
Kano has a number of large markets, including Kurmi Market, Kantin Kwari Market, Sabon Gari Market, Dawanau Market, Kofar Wanbai Market, Galadima Market, Yankura Market and Bata Market. Many markets specialise in certain products such as textiles or grain. Since the 19th century, the dye industry has contributed to Kano's economy.

=== Agriculture ===
Subsistence and commercial agriculture are primarily practised in the state's outlying districts. Food crops include millet, cowpeas, sorghum, maize and rice for local consumption, and groundnuts and cotton are produced for export and industry. During the colonial period and several years after the country's independence, the groundnuts produced in the state constituted one of the major sources of revenue of the country. Kano State is a major producer of hides and skins, sesame, soybeans, cotton, garlic, gum arabic and chili peppers. A 2018 study of Tudun Wada found that temperature and rainfall were likely to increase with climate change (placing increased stress on crops), and would require adaptation of agricultural practices.

=== Industry ===
Kano State is Nigeria's second-largest industrial centre, after Lagos State, and the largest in northern Nigeria. Industries include textiles, tanning, footwear, cosmetics, plastics, enamelware, pharmaceuticals, ceramics, furniture, agricultural implements, soft drinks, food and beverages, dairy products, vegetable oil, and animal feed. Kano is the centre of a growing Islamic banking industry in Nigeria.

=== Tourism ===
Tourist attractions in the state include:

- Kurmi Market, established in the 15th century
- Kano's city wall
- Gidan Rumfa (the emir's palace)
- Kano Zoo
- Dalla and Gwauron Dutse Hills
- Kano Museum
- Bashir Tofa mosque
- Gidan dan Hausa Museum
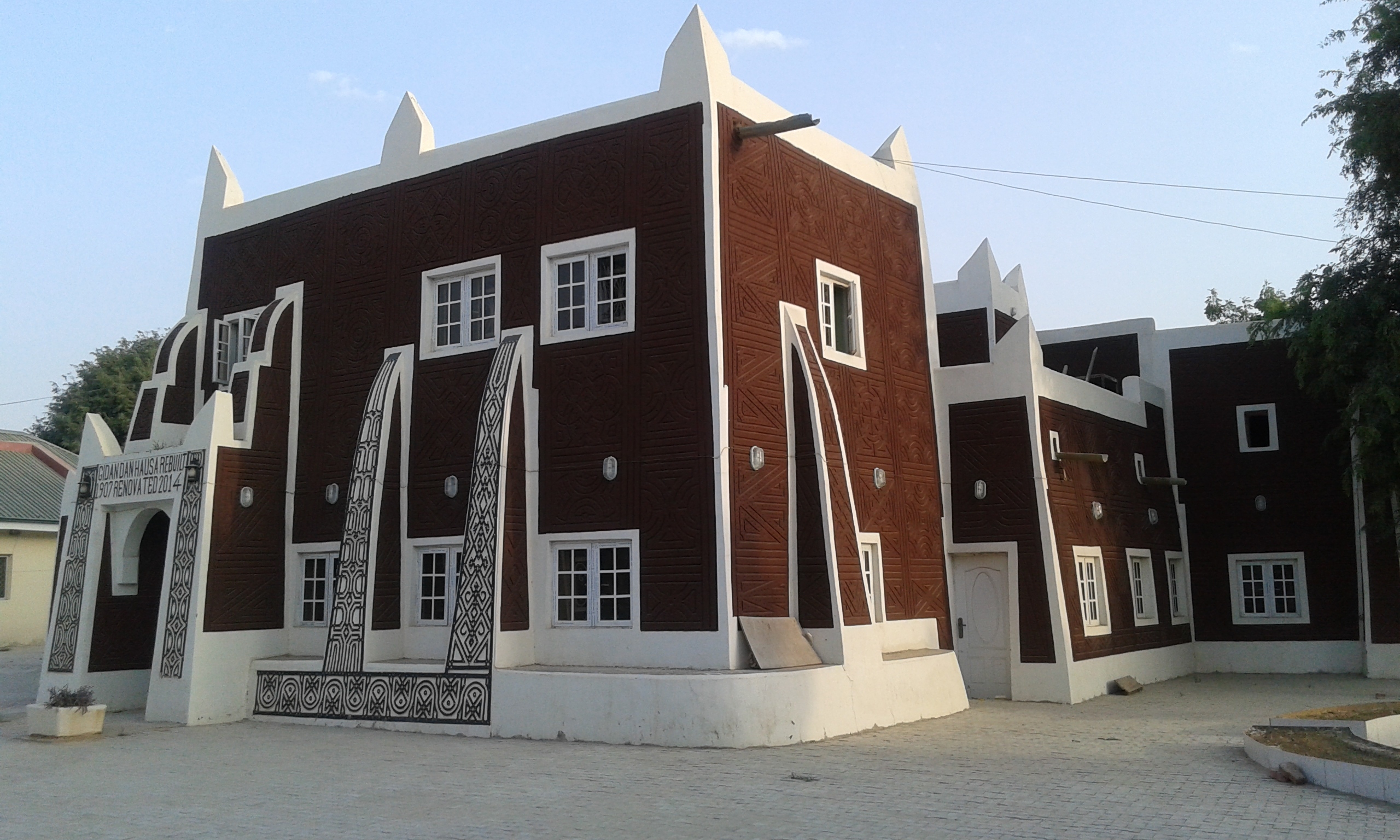
Gidan Dan Hausa Museum

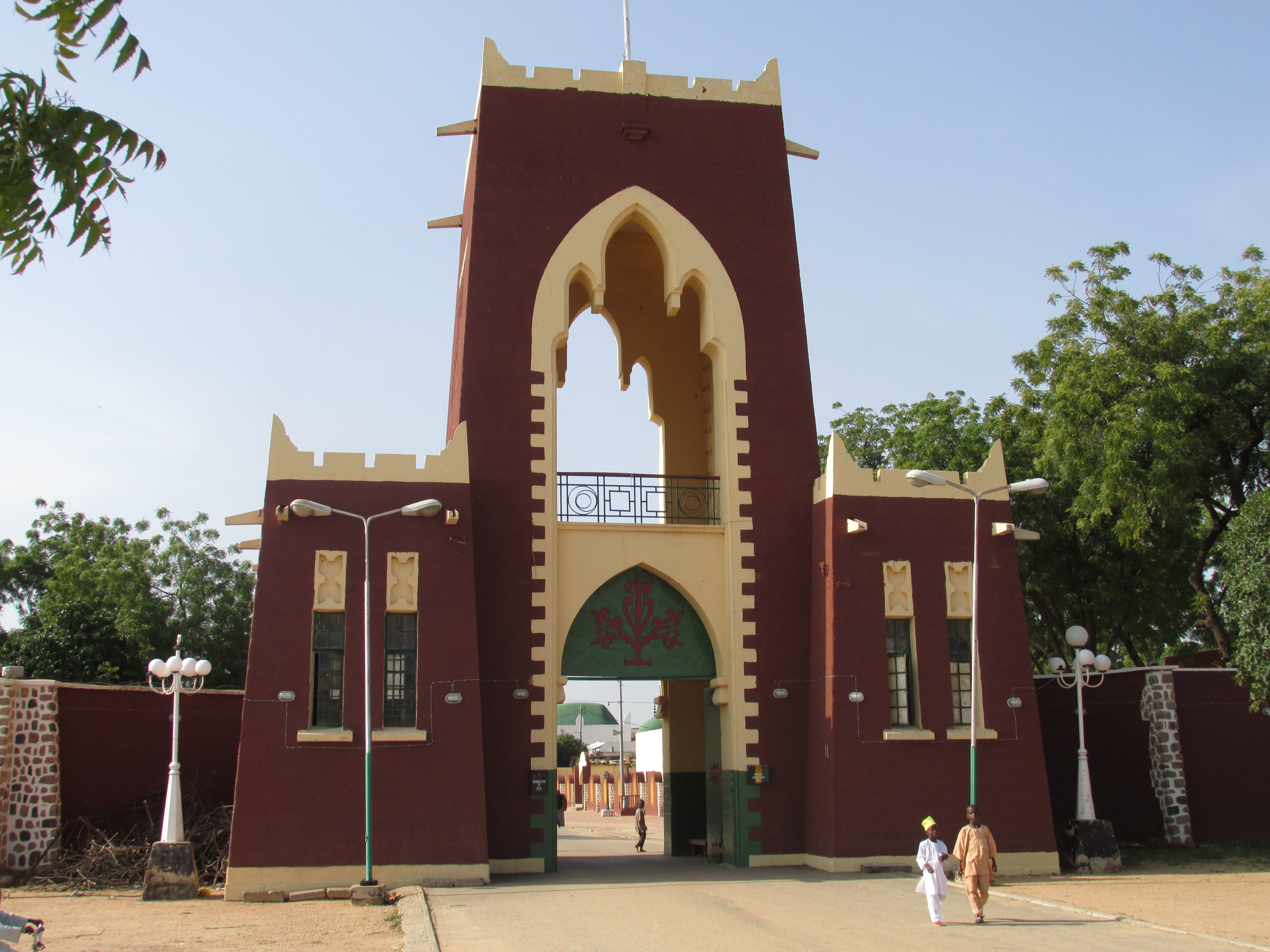
Gidan Rumfa

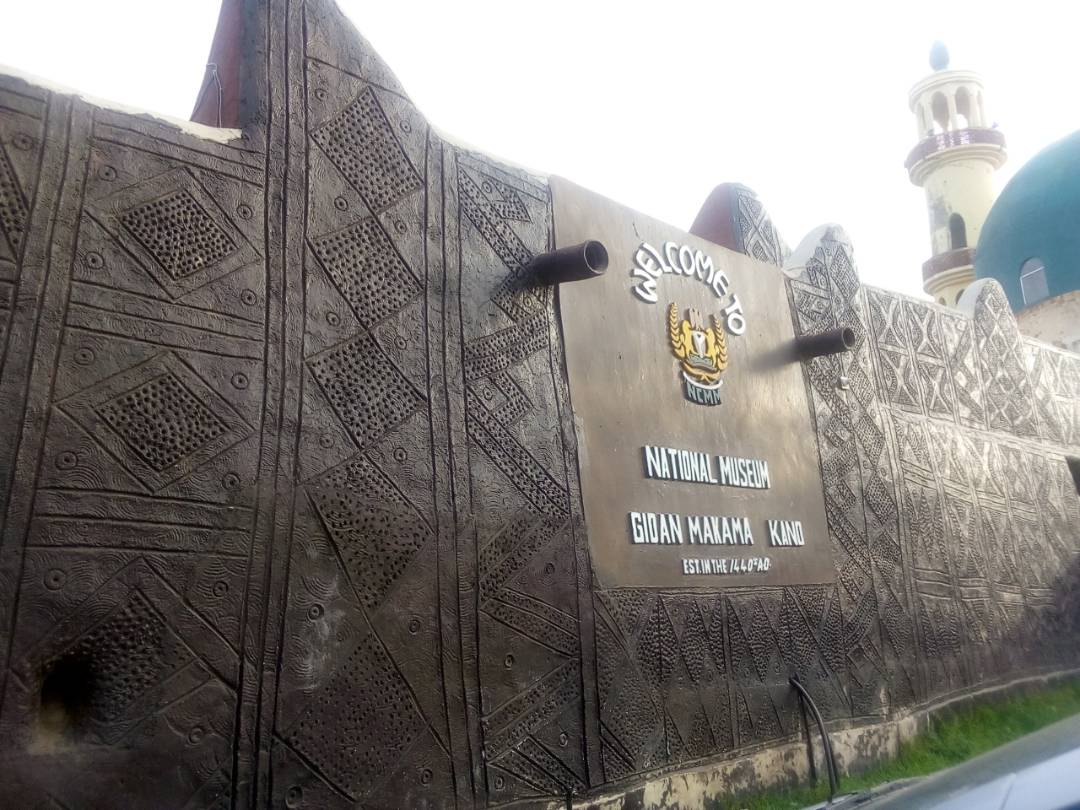
Kano Museum

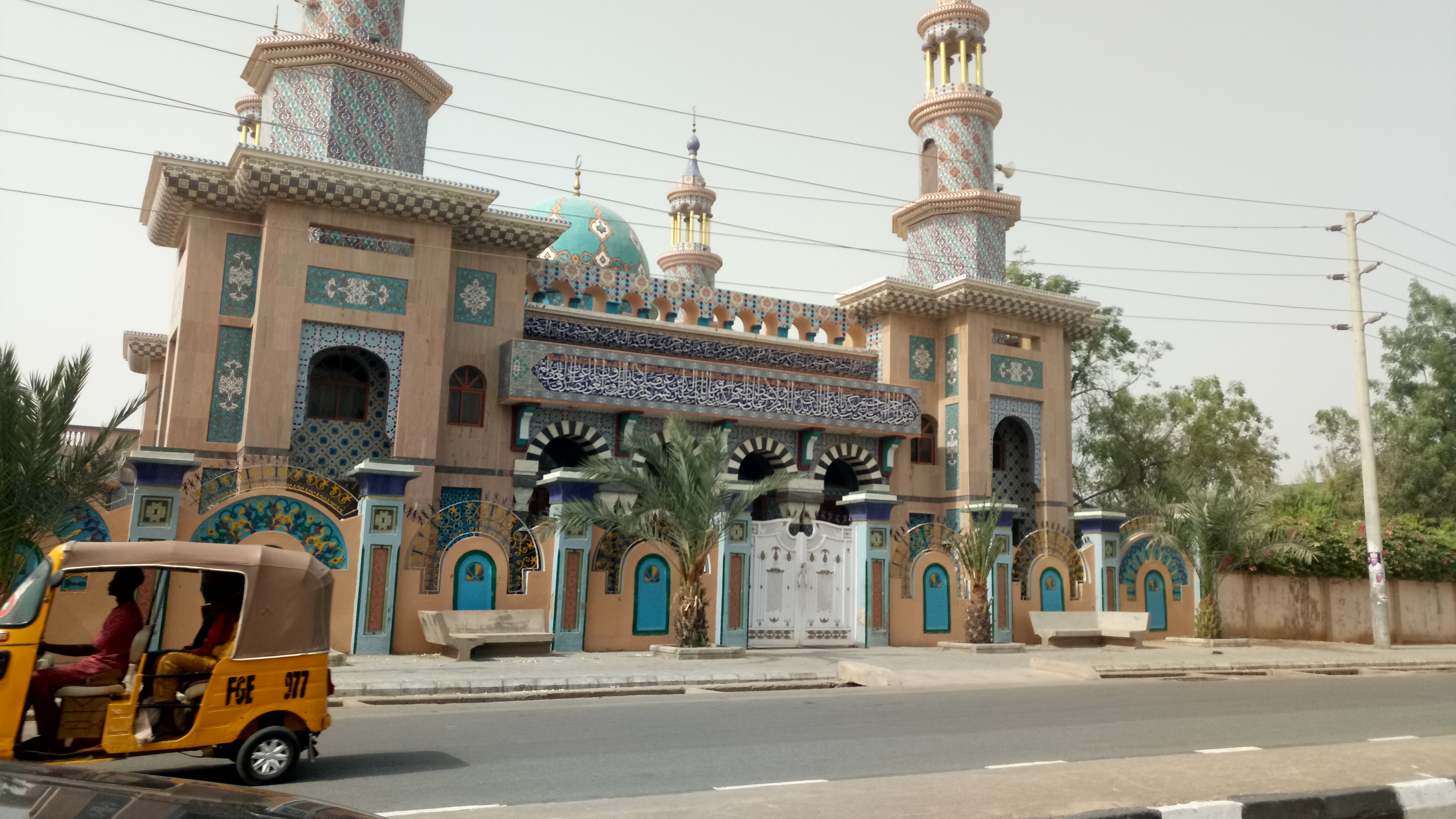
Bashir Uthman Tofa Mosque

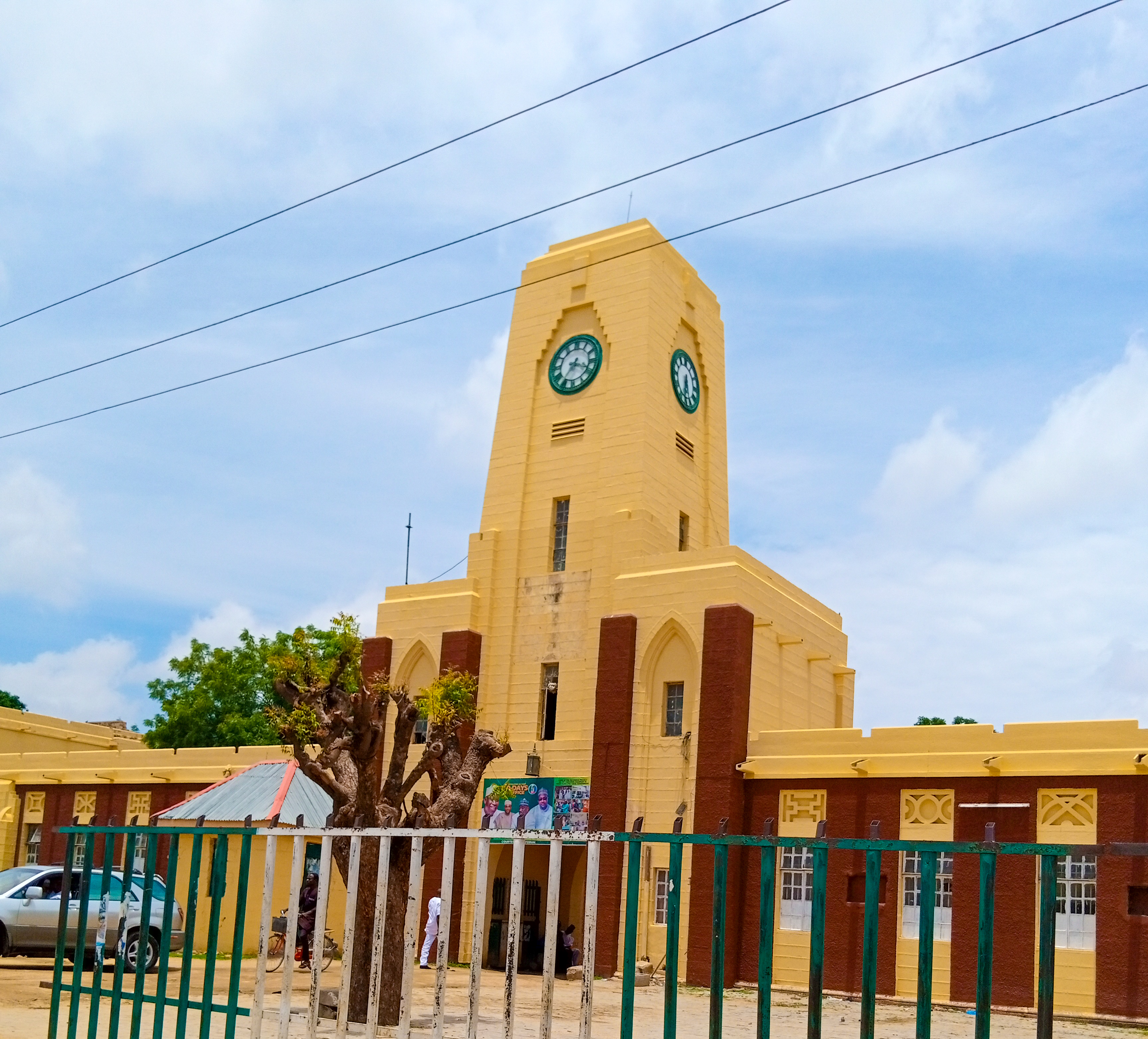
Kano Emirate palace

== Natural resources ==
Kano State has a variety of natural resources, including the minerals cassiterite, copper, gemstones, glass sand, lead, zinc and tantalite.

== Transport ==
=== Roads ===
==== Federal highways ====
- A2 (part of the Trans-Sahara Highway, or TAH 2) north from Kaduna State at Gidan Mallam Idi for 166 kilometres (103 mi) as Zaria Road via Kura, Nassarawa, Kano, Bankaura, Kunya, Dambarta and Ajumawa to Jigawa State at Yanzaki
- A9 (part of the Dakar-Ndjamena Trans-Sahelian Highway, or TAH 5) northwest from A2 at Bankaura, 14 kilometres (8.7 mi) north of Kano City for 71 kilometres (44 mi) via Bichi, Dan Zabuwa and Tsanyawa as IBB Way to Katsina State at Yan Kamaye
- A237, continuing the TAH 5 east from A2 in Kano for 110 kilometres (68 mi) across the Hadejia River at Wudil via Takai and Kachako to Jigawa State as Kano Road

==== Other major roads ====
- The Kunya-Mutum road northeast from the A2 to Jigawa State at Duma
- The Kano-Gumel road northeast via Dosai, Gezawa, Kirazare and Dadin Diniya to Jigawa State, near Magama
- The Kano-Ringim road east from Dosai via Gwandu, Wangara, Zugachi and Zakirai to Jigawa State at Gorshinsi
- South from Gwandu via Gogel to the A237 at Zogarava
- The Gaya-Wudil Road east from the A237 to Jigawa at Dundubis as the Gaya-Azare Road
- South from the A2 at Karfi Ruga as the Kano-Kumbotso-Rano (or Rano-Karfin Ruga) Road via Bunkure, Rano, Kibiya, Tarai, Burunburum, Sitti and Masu to Bauchi State at Gwanda as the Sabon Gari-Gwanda-Kafin-Birgi Road
- The Kafin Maiyaki-Sabin Bimi Road south from the A2 via Arna, Tudun Wada, Falgore Game Reserve, Tagwaye and Dadin Kowa to Kaduna State at Murai
- The Kiru-Rurum Road north from the A2 at Kafin Maiyaki via Yako and Karaye to Gwarzo as the Kafi-Jamaa Kosa Road
- Murtala Mohammed Road west from Kano city to Katsina State at Gangara
- The Gwarzo-Shanono Road north via Bagawi to the A9 at Bichi

=== Railways ===
Kano is on the 1067 mm Cape-gauge Western Railway line from Lagos via Kaduna to Jigawa State (rehabilitated in 2013), with a double-track standard-gauge line proposed in 2025.

=== Airport ===
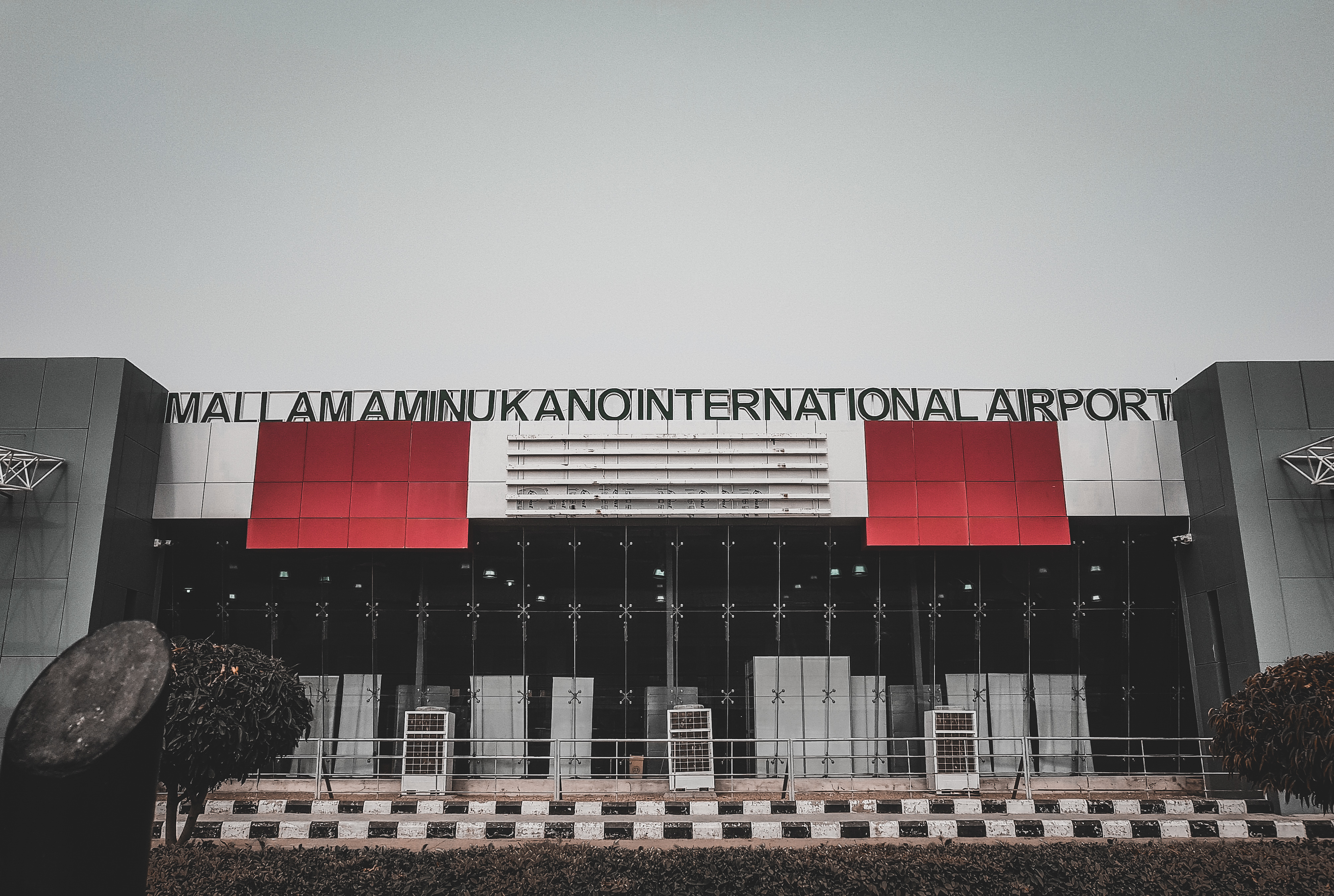
Malam Aminu Kano International Airport

Mallam Aminu Kano International Airport, built in 1936, is the headquarters of Kabo Air, Azman Airlines and Max Air.

== Education ==
=== Secondary schools ===
- Dawakin Tofa Science College
- Rumfa College, Kano

=== Universities ===
Kano State has five universities: one federal university, one regimented federal university, two state universities, and one private university.

- Bayero University Kano (BUK), founded in 1977
- Kano University of Science and Technology (KUST), founded in 2001
- Nigeria Police Academy Wudil, founded as Nigeria's 37th federal university in 2011
- Northwest University, Kano (YUSMUK), founded in 2012
- Skyline University, Kano, founded in 2018

=== Polytechnics and colleges ===
- Aminu Kano College of Islamic Legal Studies, Kano
- Audu Bako School of Agriculture, Dambatta
- Federal College of Education, Kano
- Kano State Polytechnic

== Local government areas ==
Kano State has 44 local government areas (LGAs).

Name	Area (km^{2})	Population (2006)	Administrative capital	Postal code
Fagge	21	200,095	Waje	700
Dala	19	418,759	Gwanmaja	700
Gwale	18	357,827	Gwale	700
Kano Municipal	17	371,243	Kofar Kudu	700
Tarauni	28	221,844	Unguwa Uku	700
Nassarawa	34	596,411	Bompai	700
Kumbotso	158	294,391	Kumbotso	700
Ungogo	204	365,737	Ungogo	700
Kano (metropolitan area)	499	2,828,861		700
Dawakin Tofa	479	246,197	Dawakin Tofa	701
Tofa	202	98,603	Tofa	701
Rimin Gado	225	103,371	Rimin Gado	701
Bagwai	405	161,533	Bagwai	701
Gezawa	340	282,328	Gezawa	702
Gabasawa	605	211,204	Zakirai	702
Minjibir	416	219,611	Minjibir	702
Dambatta	732	210,474	Dambatta	702
Makoda	441	220,094	Makoda	702
Ghari	671	110,170	Kunchi	703
Bichi	612	278,309	Bichi	703
Tsanyawa	492	157,730	Tsanyawa	703
Shanono	697	139,128	Shanono	704
Gwarzo	393	183,624	Gwarzo	704
Karaye	479	144,045	Karaye	704
Rogo	802	227,607	Rogo	704
Kabo	341	153,158	Kabo	704
Northern Kano State	8,332	3,143,899		701–704
Bunkure	487	174,467	Bunkure	710
Kibiya	404	138,618	Kibiya	710
Rano	520	148,276	Rano	710
Tudun Wada	1,204	228,658	Tudun Wada	710
Doguwa	1,473	150,645	Riruwai	710
Madobi	273	137,685	Madobi	711
Kura	206	143,094	Kura	711
Garun Mallam	214	118,622	Garun Mallam	711
Bebeji	717	191,916	Bebeji	711
Kiru	927	267,168	Kiru	711
Sumaila	1,250	250,379	Sumaila	712
Garko	450	161,966	Garko	712
Takai	598	202,639	Takai	712
Albasu	398	187,639	Albasu	712
Gaya	613	207,419	Gaya	713
Ajingi	714	172,610	Ajingi	713
Wudil	362	188,639	Wudil	713
Warawa	360	131,858	Warawa	713
Dawakin Kudu	384	225,497	Dawakin Kudu	713
Southern Kano State	11,554	3,410,922		710 to 713

== Demographics ==
According to the 2006 census, Kano State had a population of 9,401,288. Based on National Bureau of Statistics data, Kano is Nigeria's most populous state; Lagos State is second. The state is primarily inhabited by Hausa and Fulani people.

Historical population
Year	Pop.	±%
1991	5,810,470	—
2006	9,401,288	+61.8%
2022	15,462,200	+64.5%

== Languages ==
The state's official languages are Hausa and Fulfulde.

== Notable people ==
- Sani Abacha (1943–1998), 10th military head of state
- Ja'afar Mahmud Adam (1960–2007), Islamic scholar
- Dije Abdu Aboki, jurist and the first female Chief Judge of Kano State
- Nazifi Asnanic, Kannywood actor and musician
- Mubarak Bala, president of the Humanist Association of Nigeria, imprisoned for social-media comments about Islam
- Aminu Ala, Hausa-language musician and writer
- Aliko Dangote, business magnate, philanthropist, and Africa's wealthiest person
- Aminu Dantata, business magnate and philanthropist
- Aminu Ibrahim Daurawa, Islamic preacher
- Abdullahi Umar Ganduje, Kano State governor from 2015 to 2023
- Ahmad Sulaiman Ibrahim, Islamic preacher
- Nura M Inuwa, Hausa musician
- Ali Jita, Hausa musician
- Abduljabbar Nasiru Kabara, Islamic preacher
- Qaribullah Nasiru Kabara, Islamic preacher
- Aminu Kano, politician and educator
- Sheikh Ibrahim Khaleel, Islamic preacher
- Rabiu Kwankwaso, former state governor and Minister of Defence
- Murtala Muhammed, fourth military head of state (1975–1976)
- Abdul Samad Rabiu, business magnate, philanthropist, and Africa's sixth-wealthiest person
- Isyaku Rabiu, businessman
- Sanusi Lamido Sanusi, former Central Bank of Nigeria governor and 14th and 16th Emir of Kano
- Ibrahim Shekarau, former governor and minister of education (2003–2011)
- Barau Jibrin, Deputy President of the Nigerian Senate since 2023
- Yusuf Babangida Suleiman, member of the seventh, eighth and ninth Kano State Houses of Assembly
- Abdullahi Aliyu Sumaila, former Kano State Executive Council secretary, Permanent Secretary, Principal Secretary to the Kano State Governor, board chair of the Hadejia-Jama'are River Basin Development Authority and Kano State Television Corporation
- Abba Kabir Yusuf, state governor since May 2023

== Politics ==
The capital city is Kano. Kano's state government is led by an elected governor who works closely with the state House of Assembly. Like all state governors, they are elected with a modified two-round system. To be elected in the first round, a candidate must receive a plurality of the vote and over 25 percent of the vote in at least two-thirds of the state's LGAs. If no candidate reaches this threshold, a second round of voting is held between the two highest-ranking candidates.

== Gallery ==
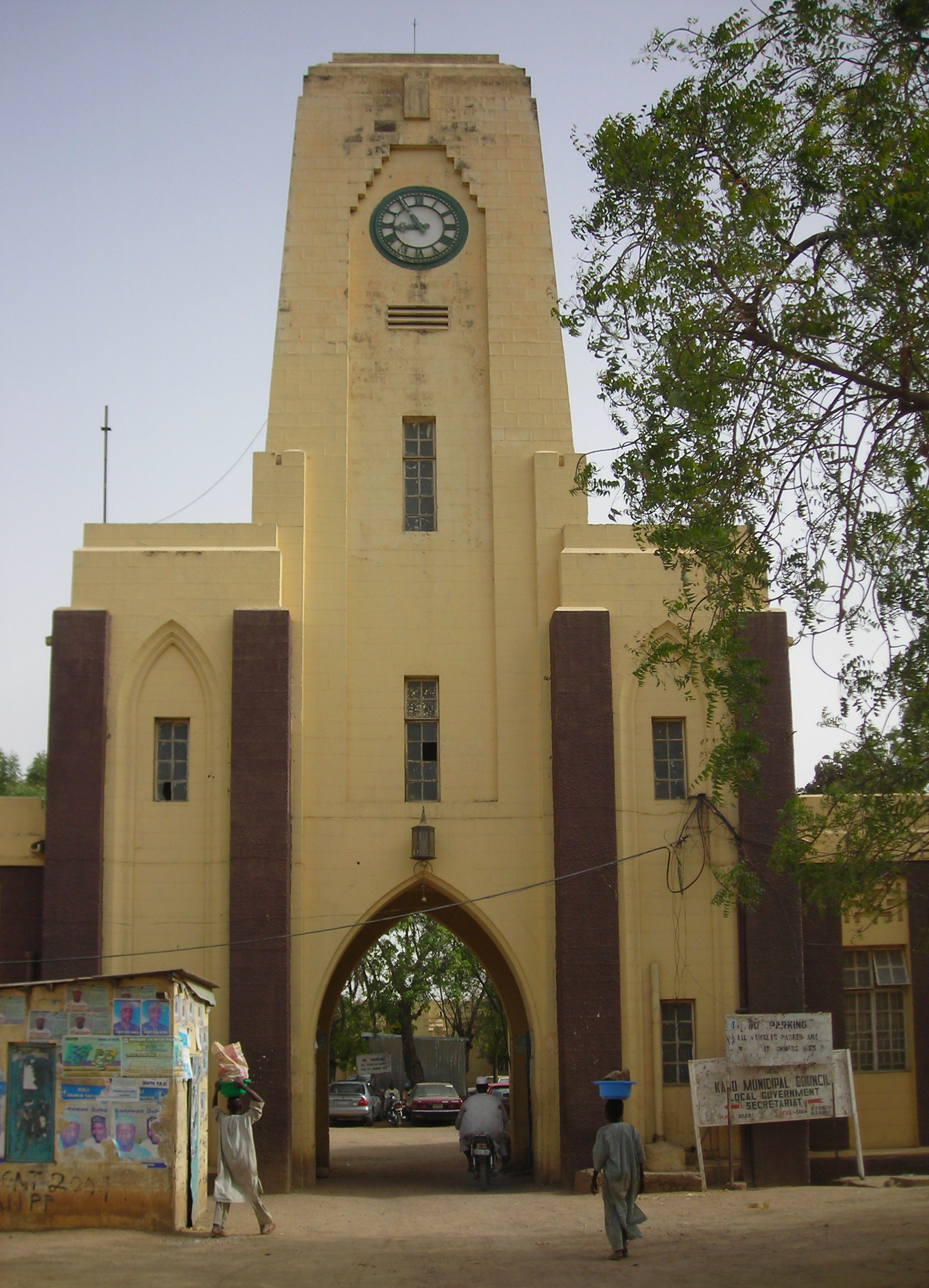
Kano council gate

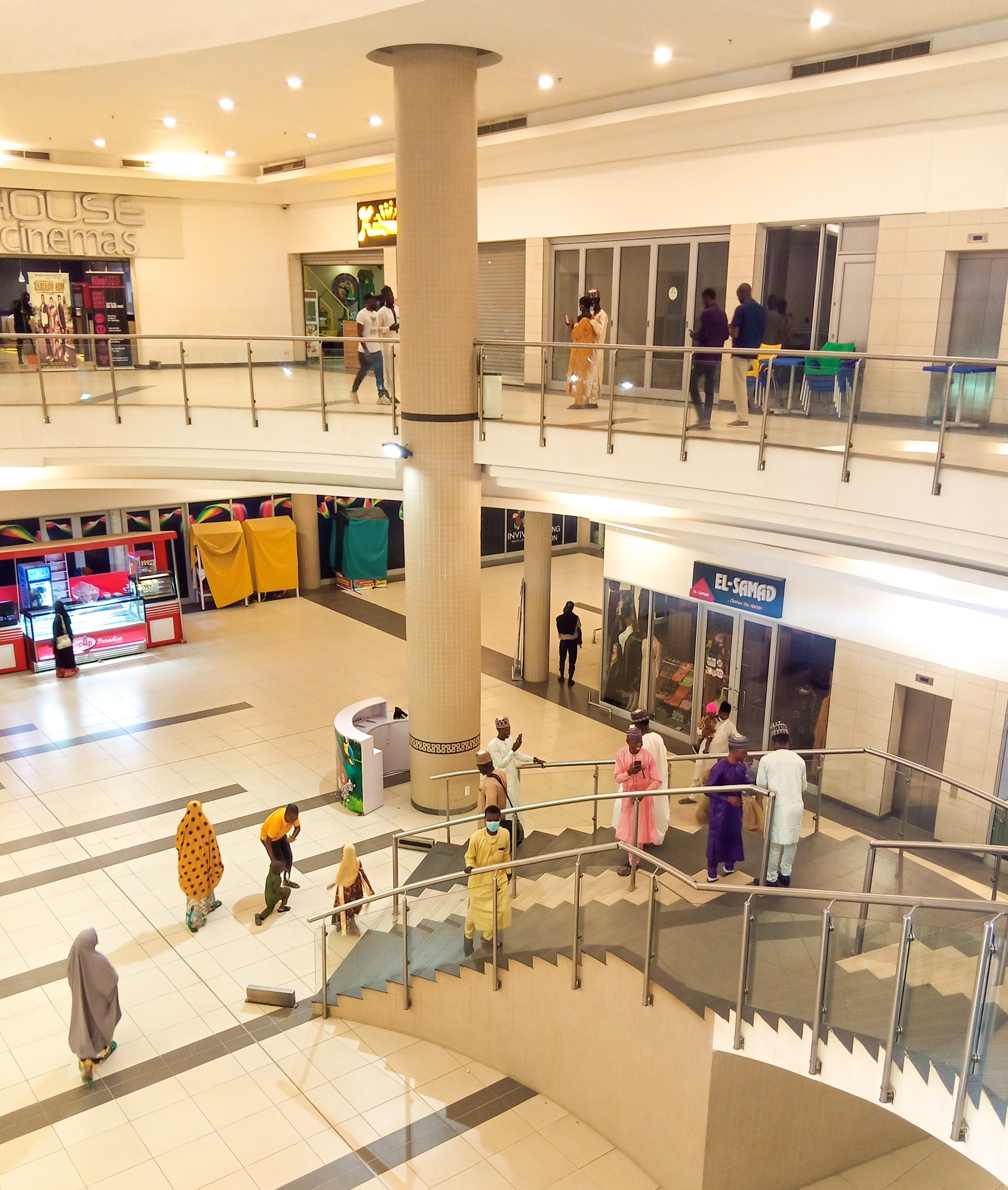
Shoptite mall

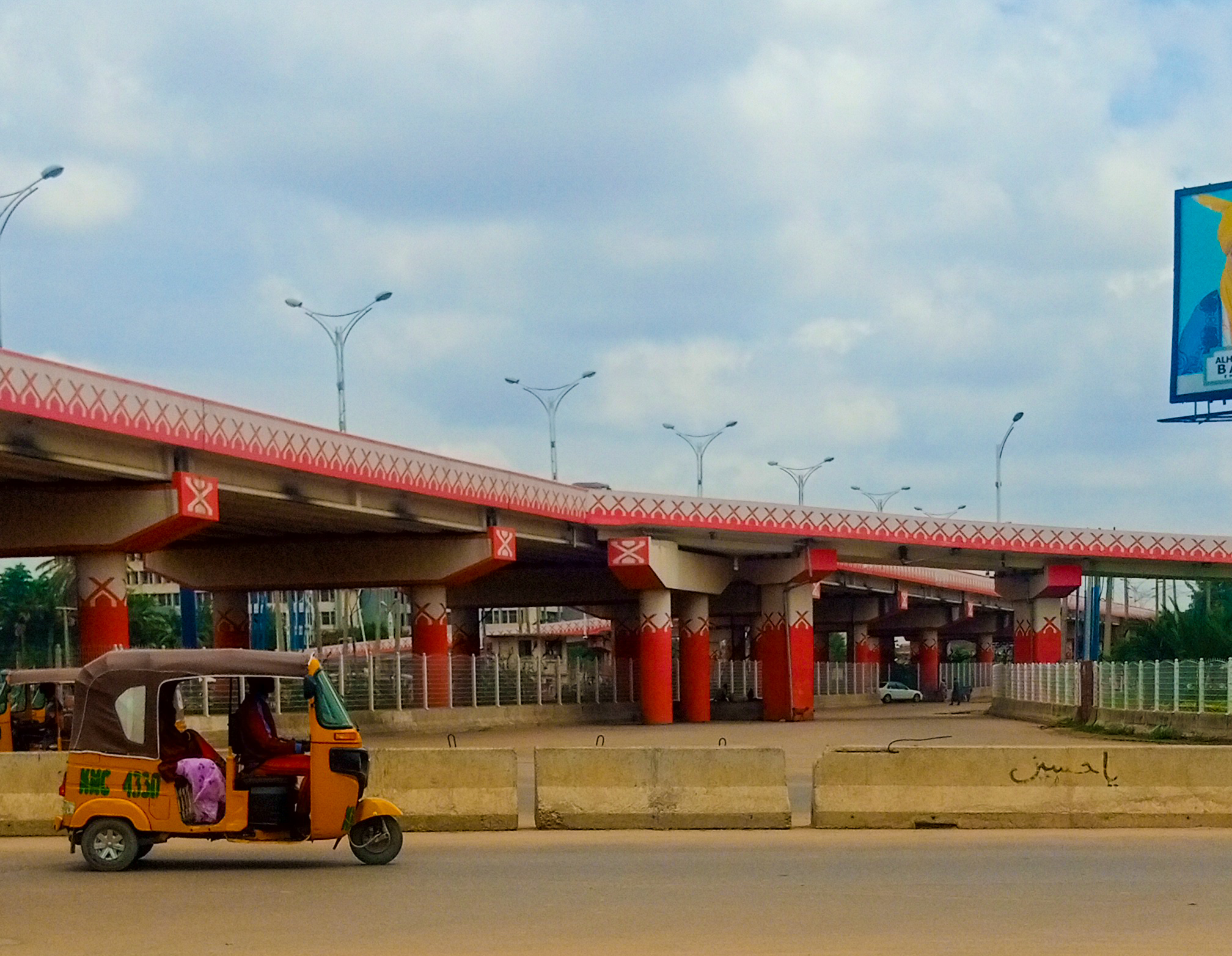
Kwankwasiyya flyover

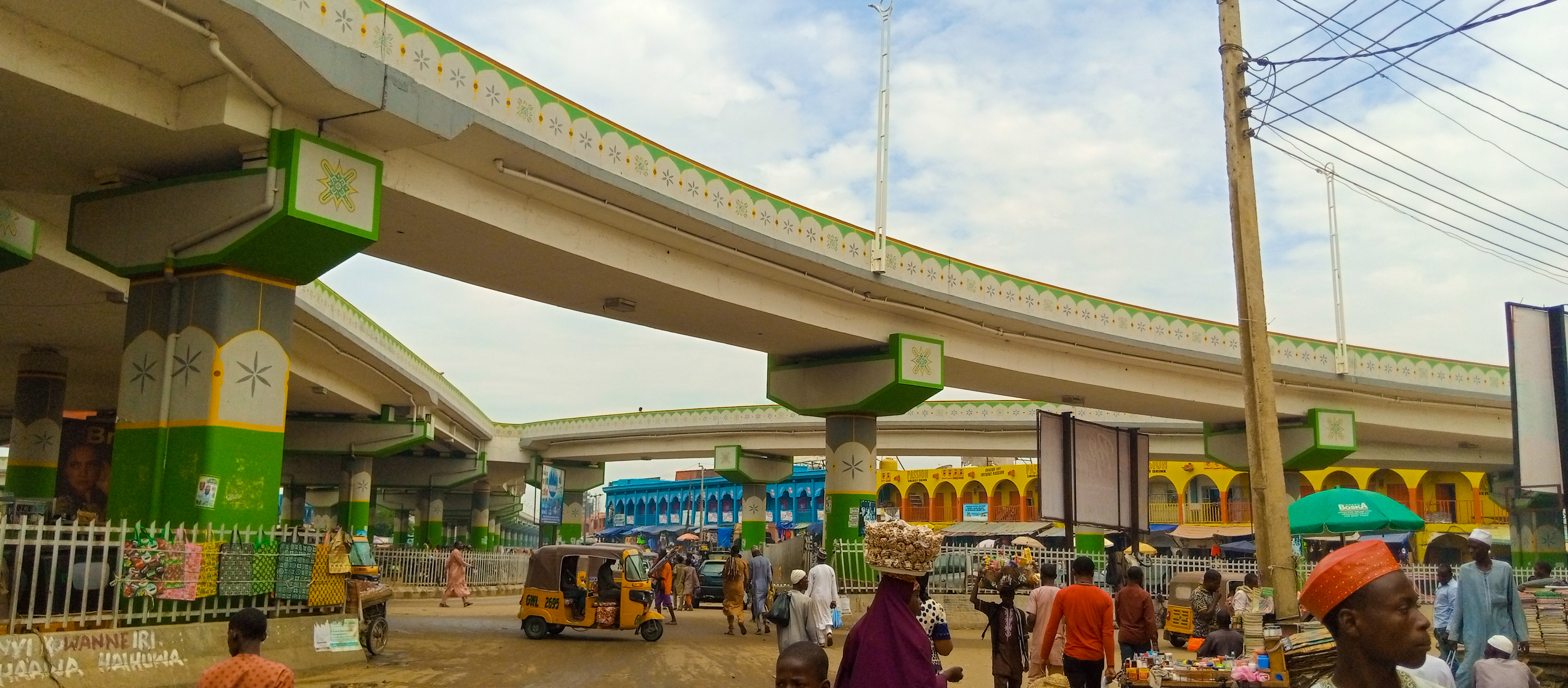
Danbatta flyover

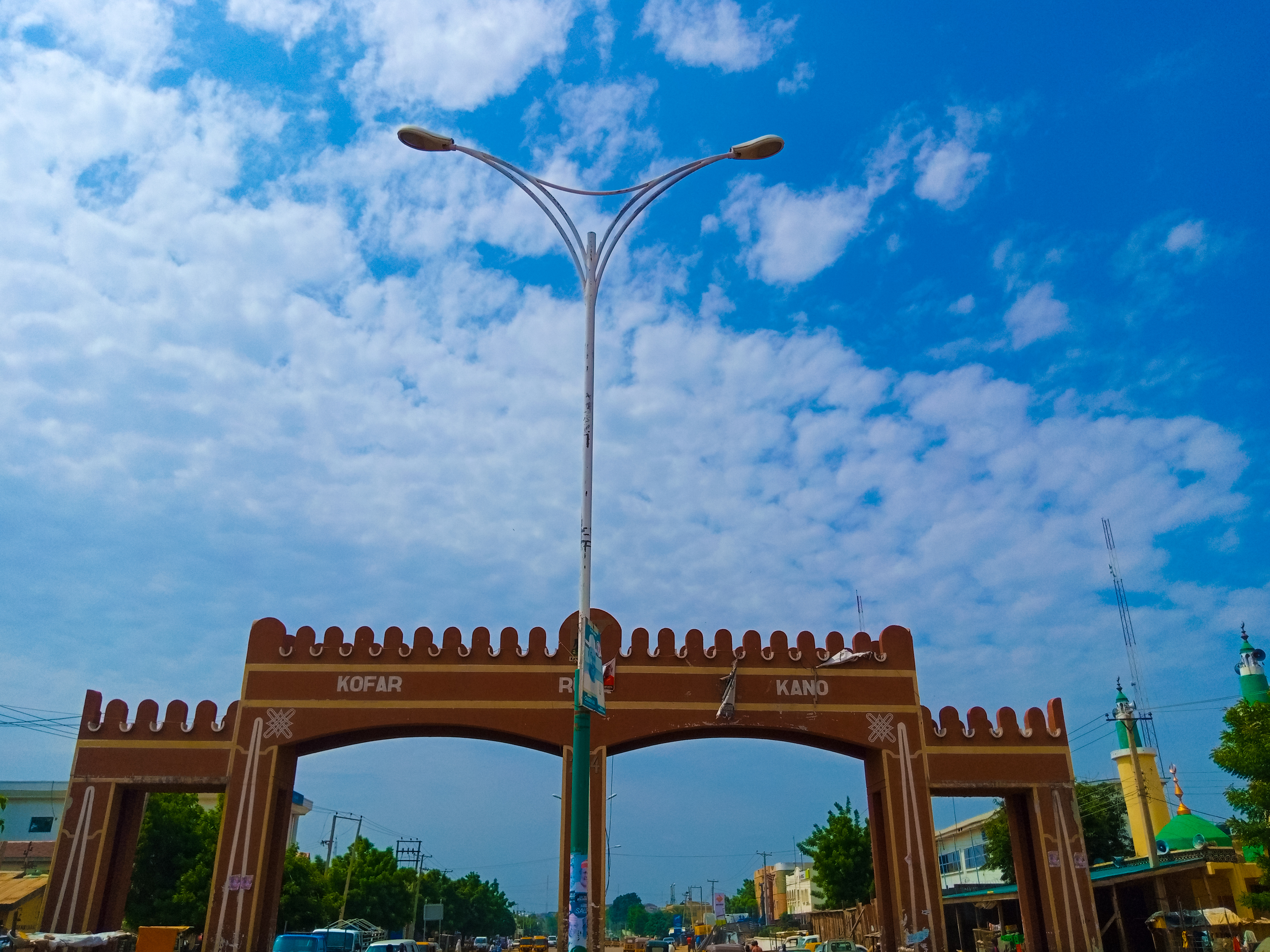
Ruwa Gate

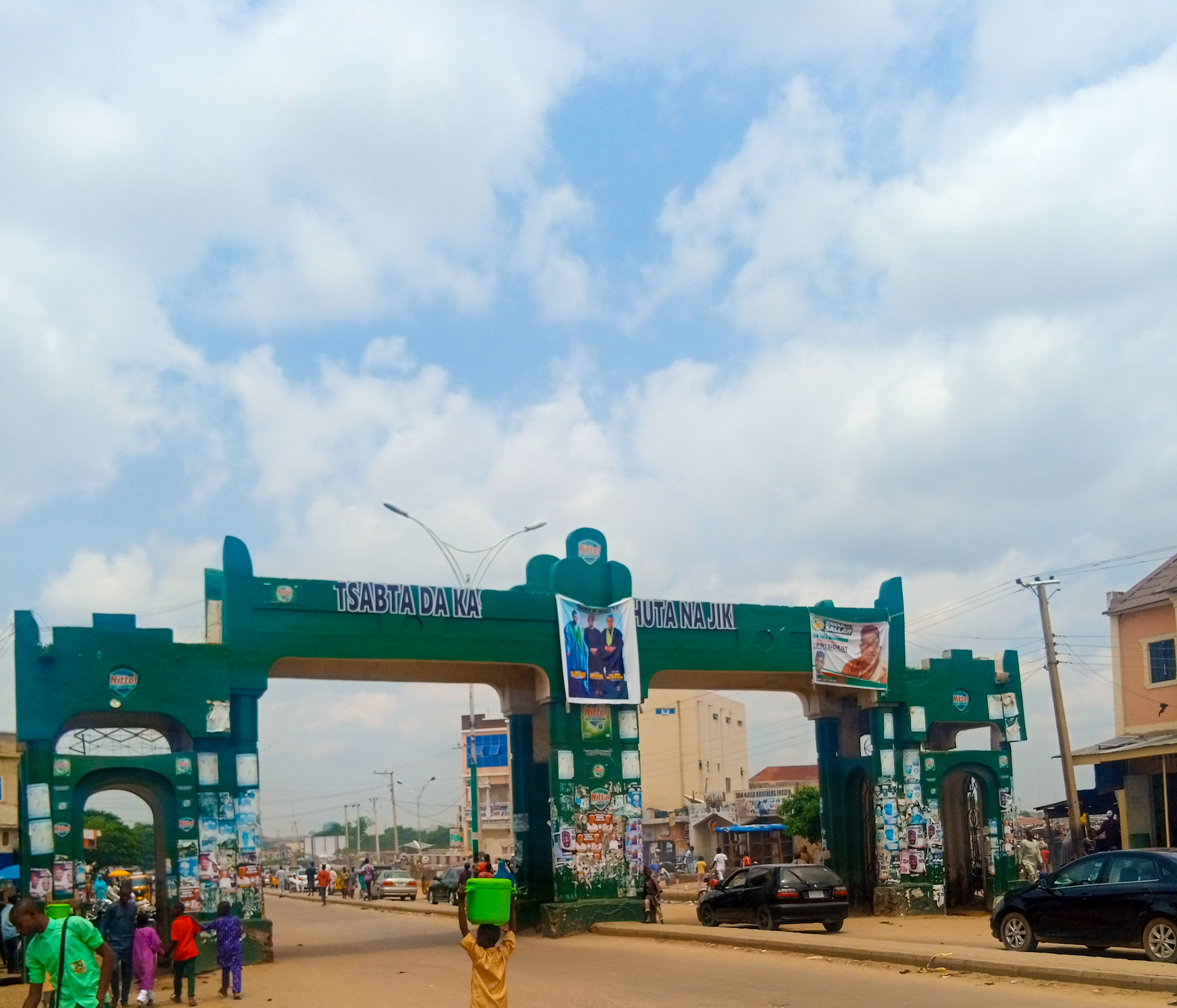
Mazugal Gate

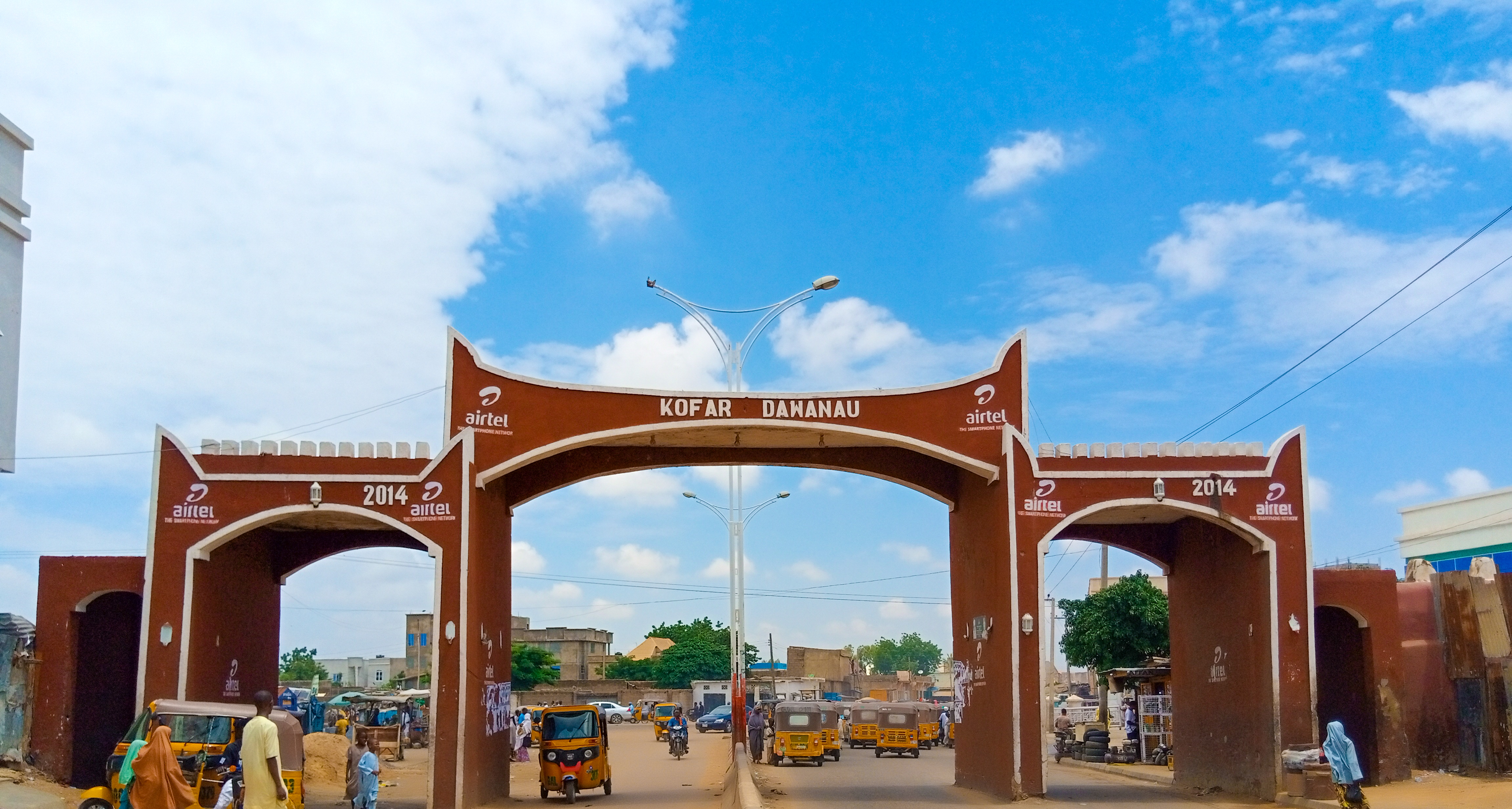
Dawanau Gate

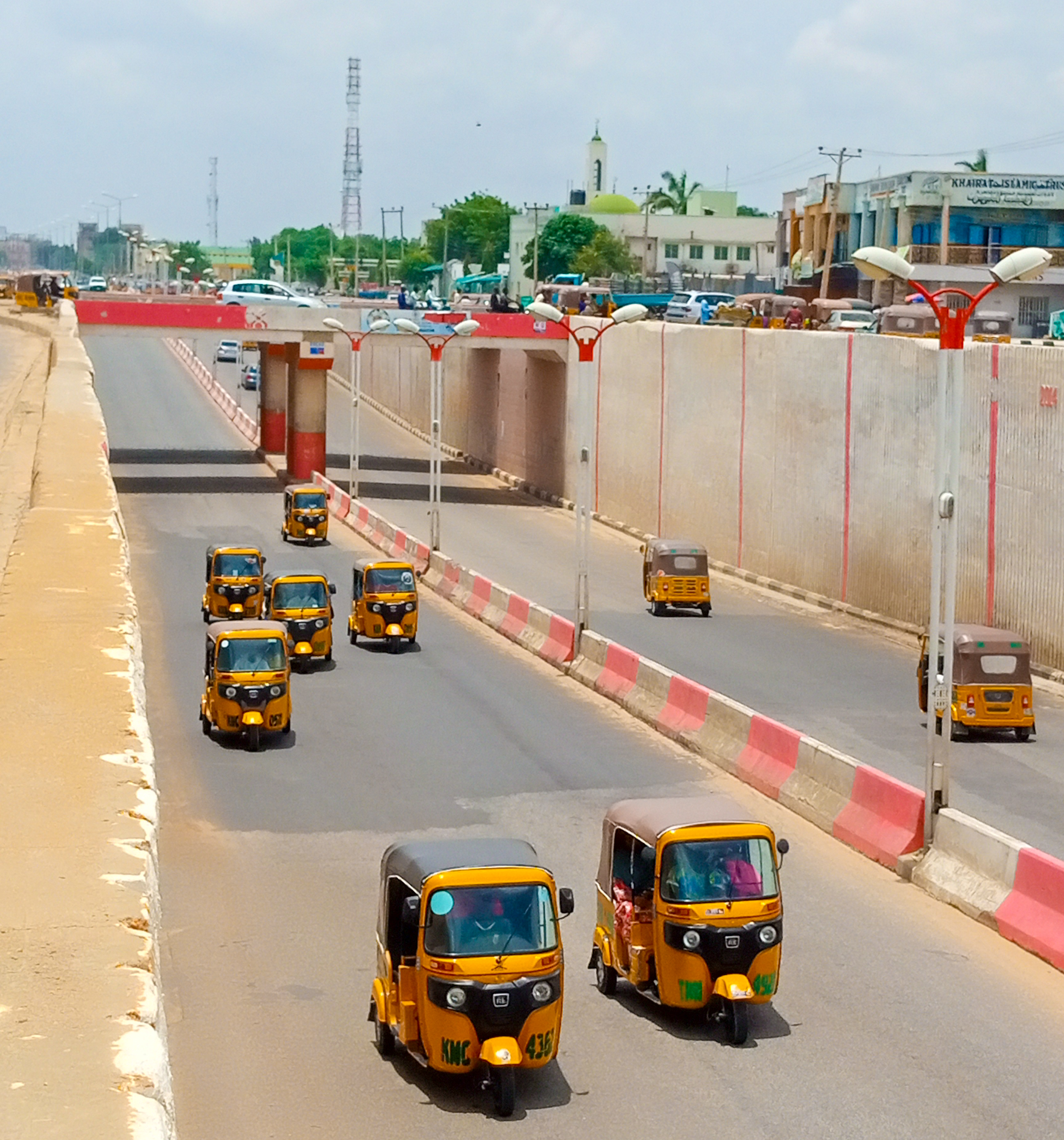
Prince Audu Abubakar underpass

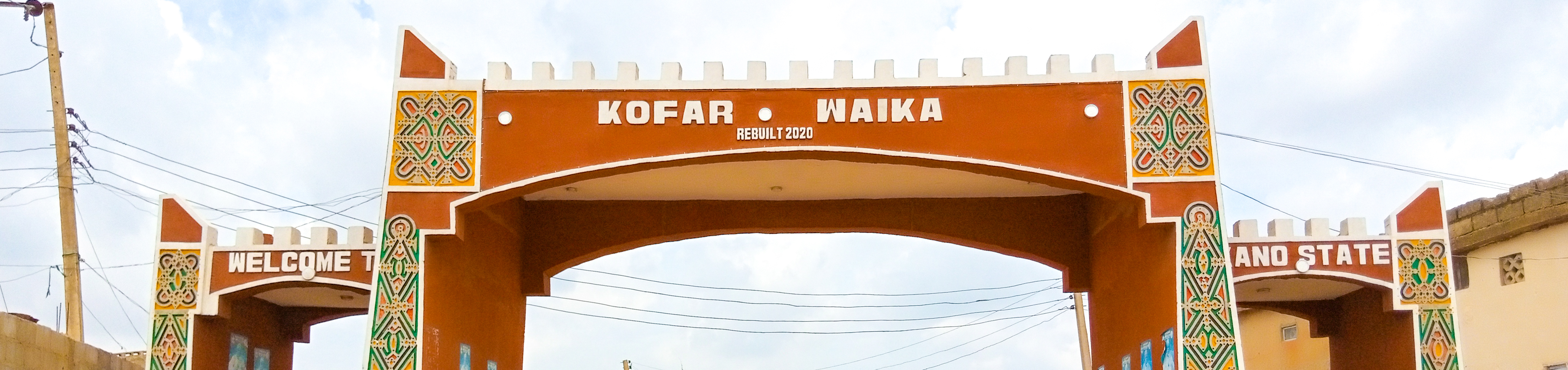
Waika Gate

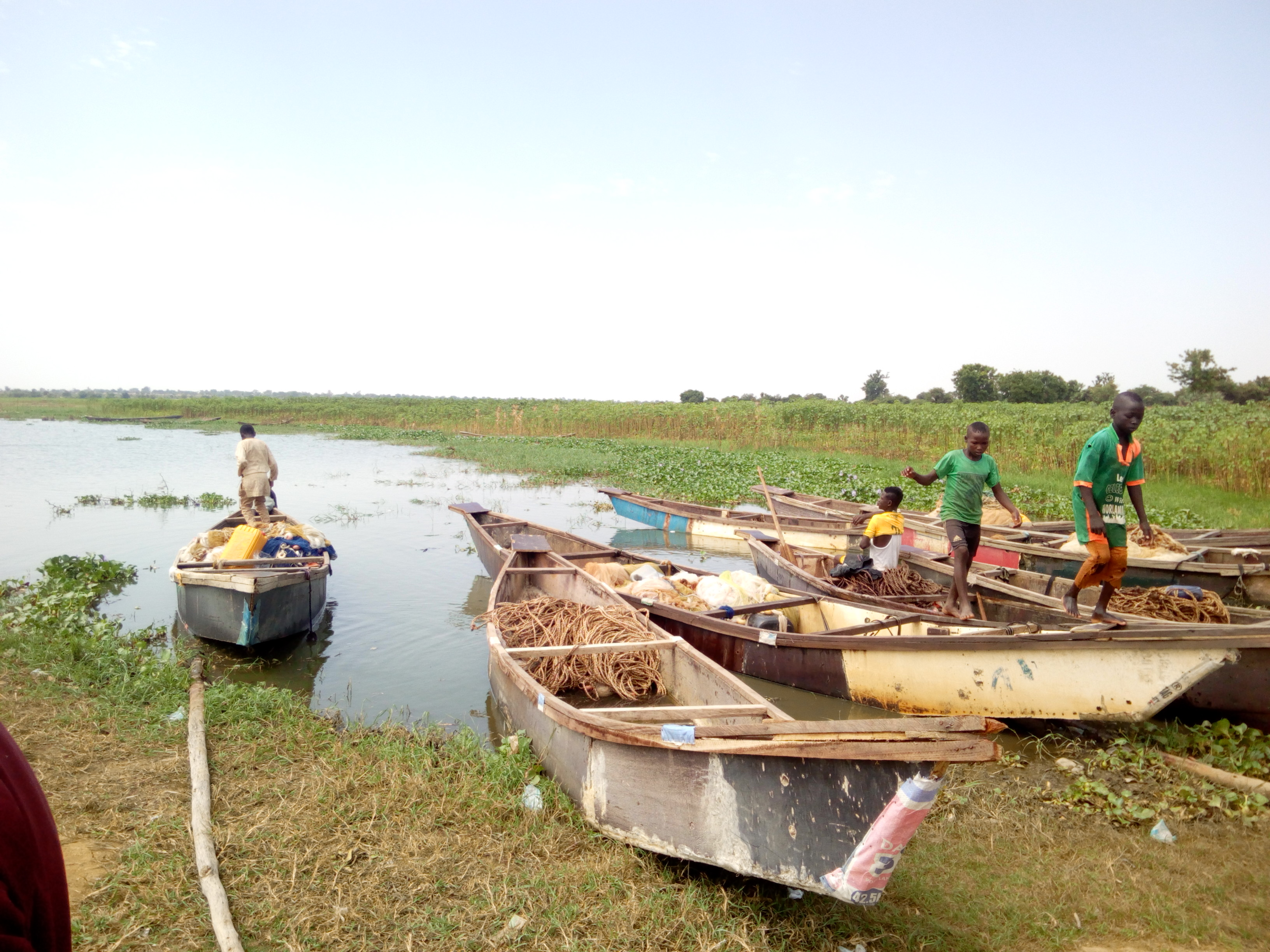
Fishermen

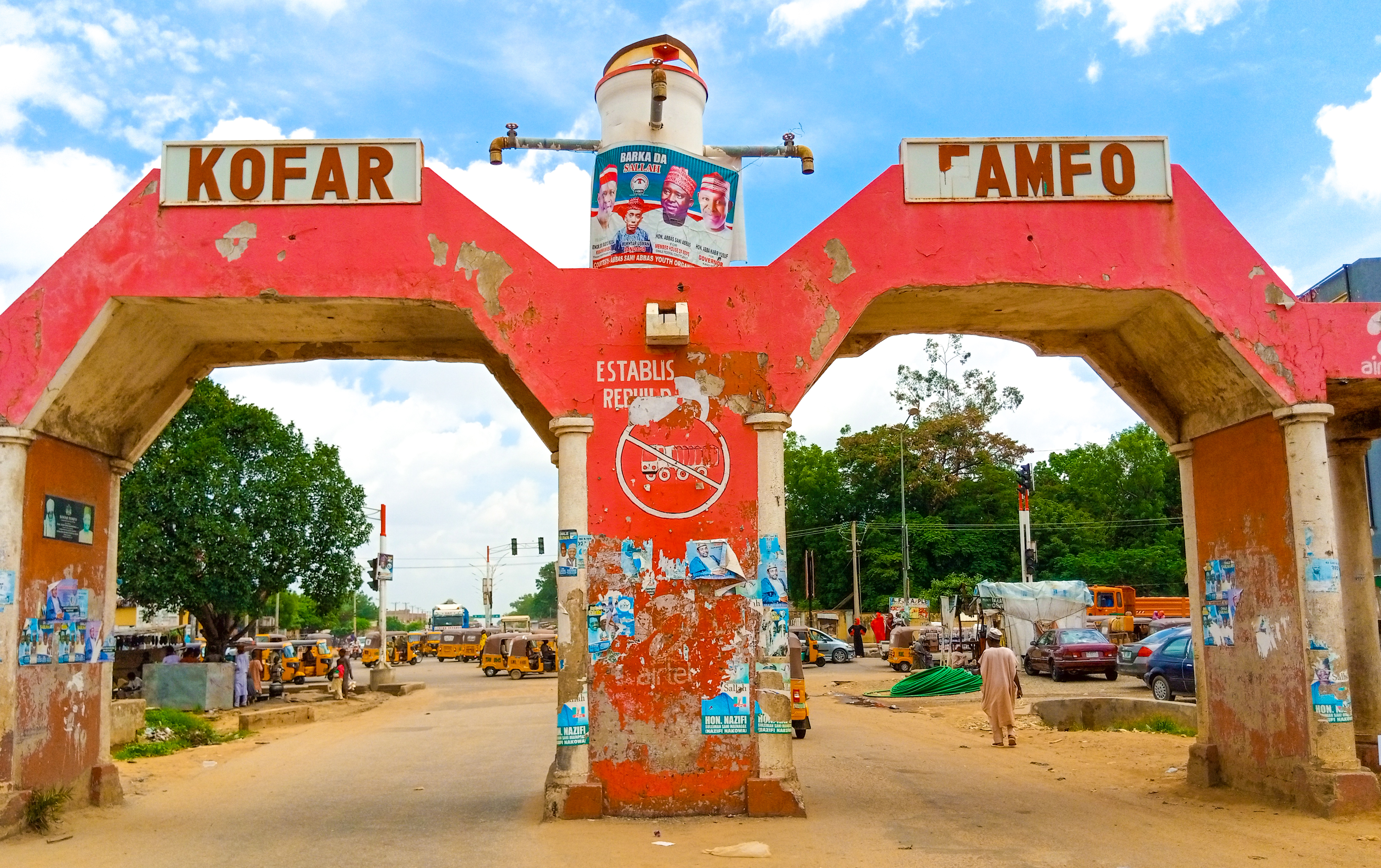
Famfo Gate

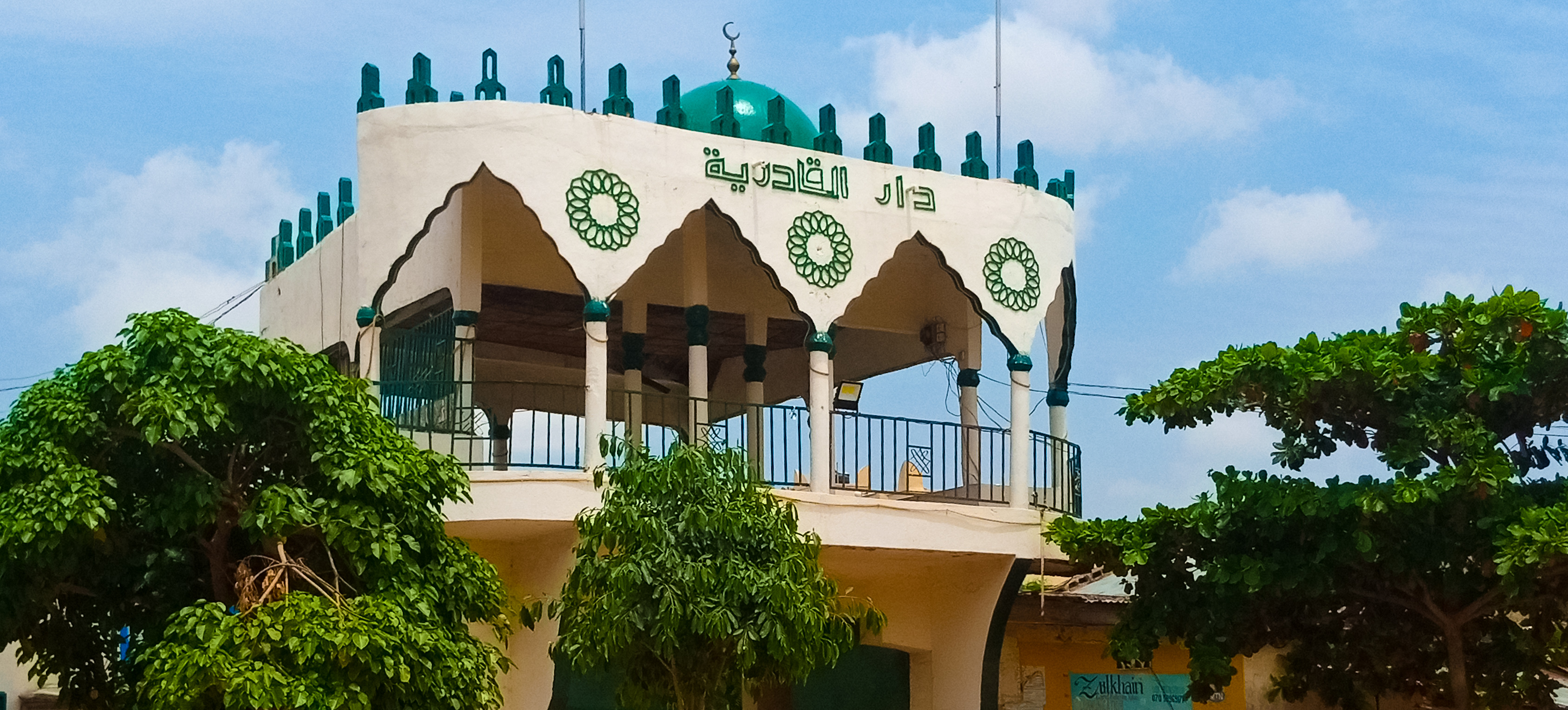
House of Kadiriyya

== See also ==
- Kano State Government
