= Kano (city) =

Capital city of Kano State, Nigeria

Kano كَنُواْ (Hausa)
- City
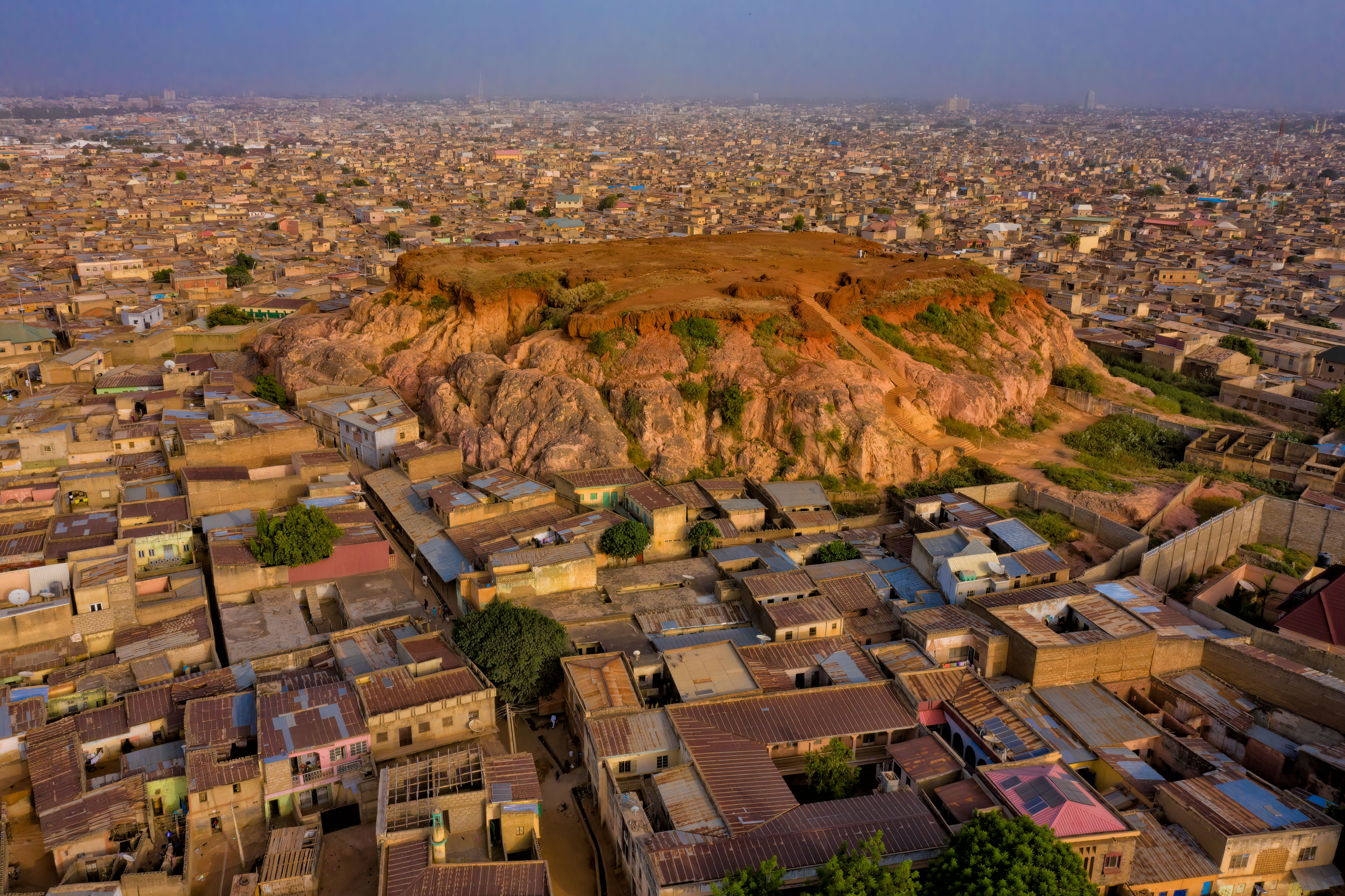
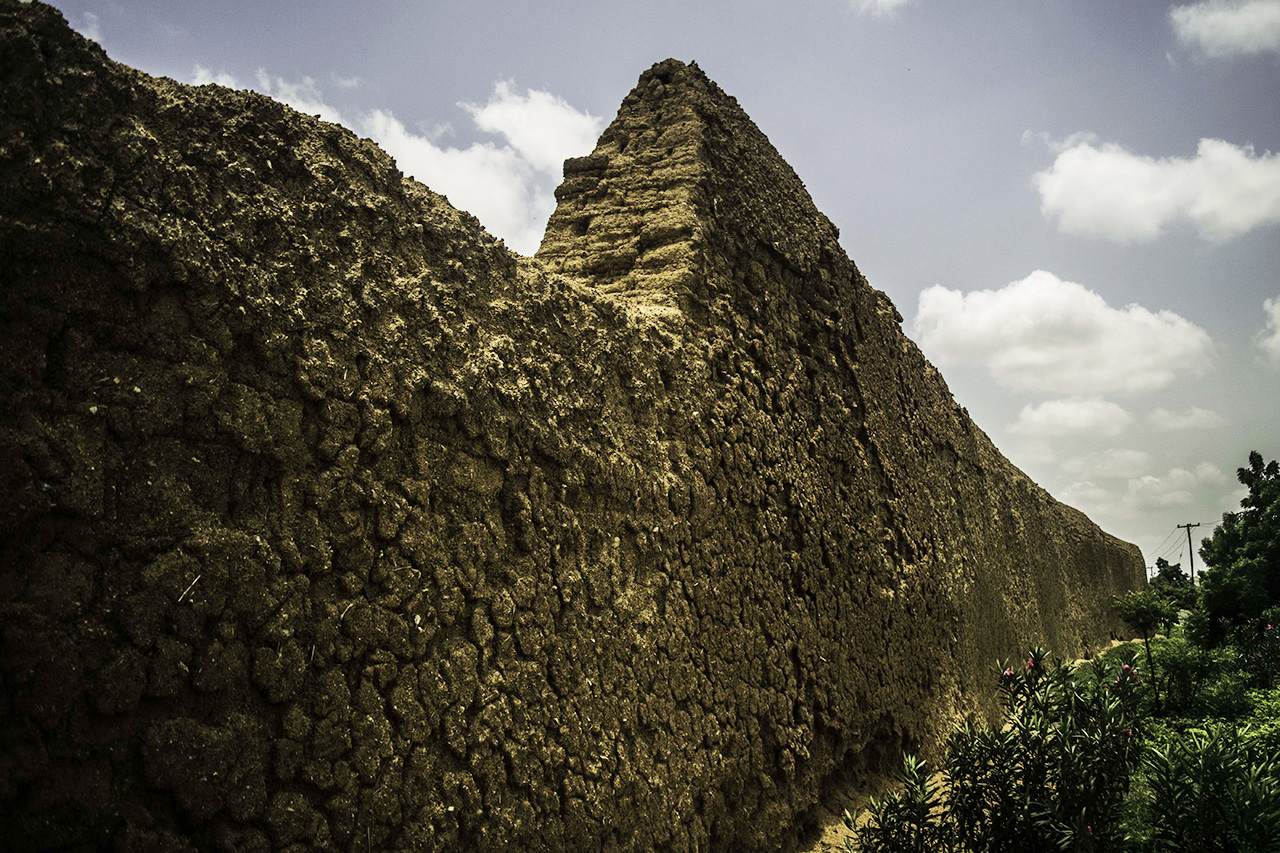
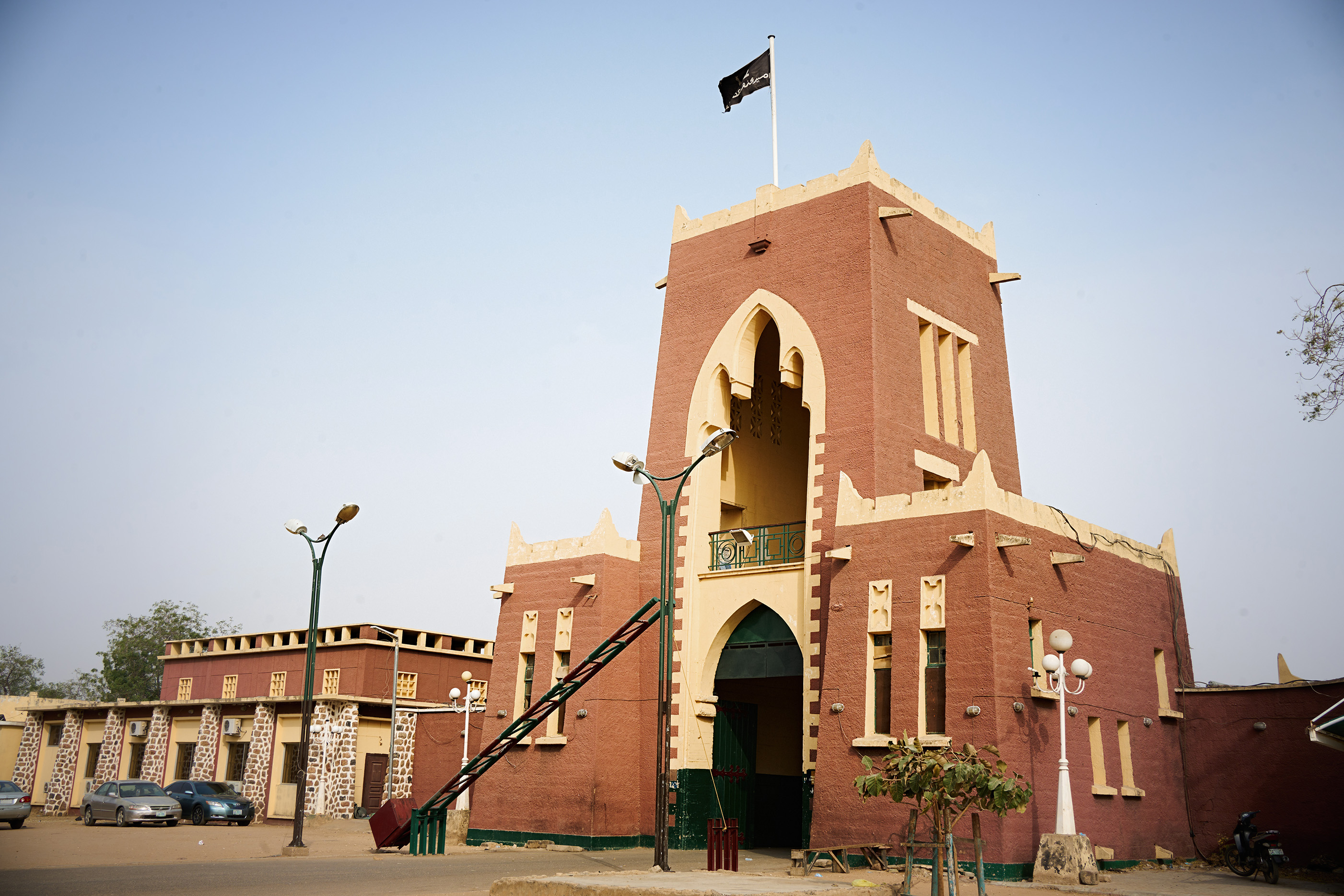
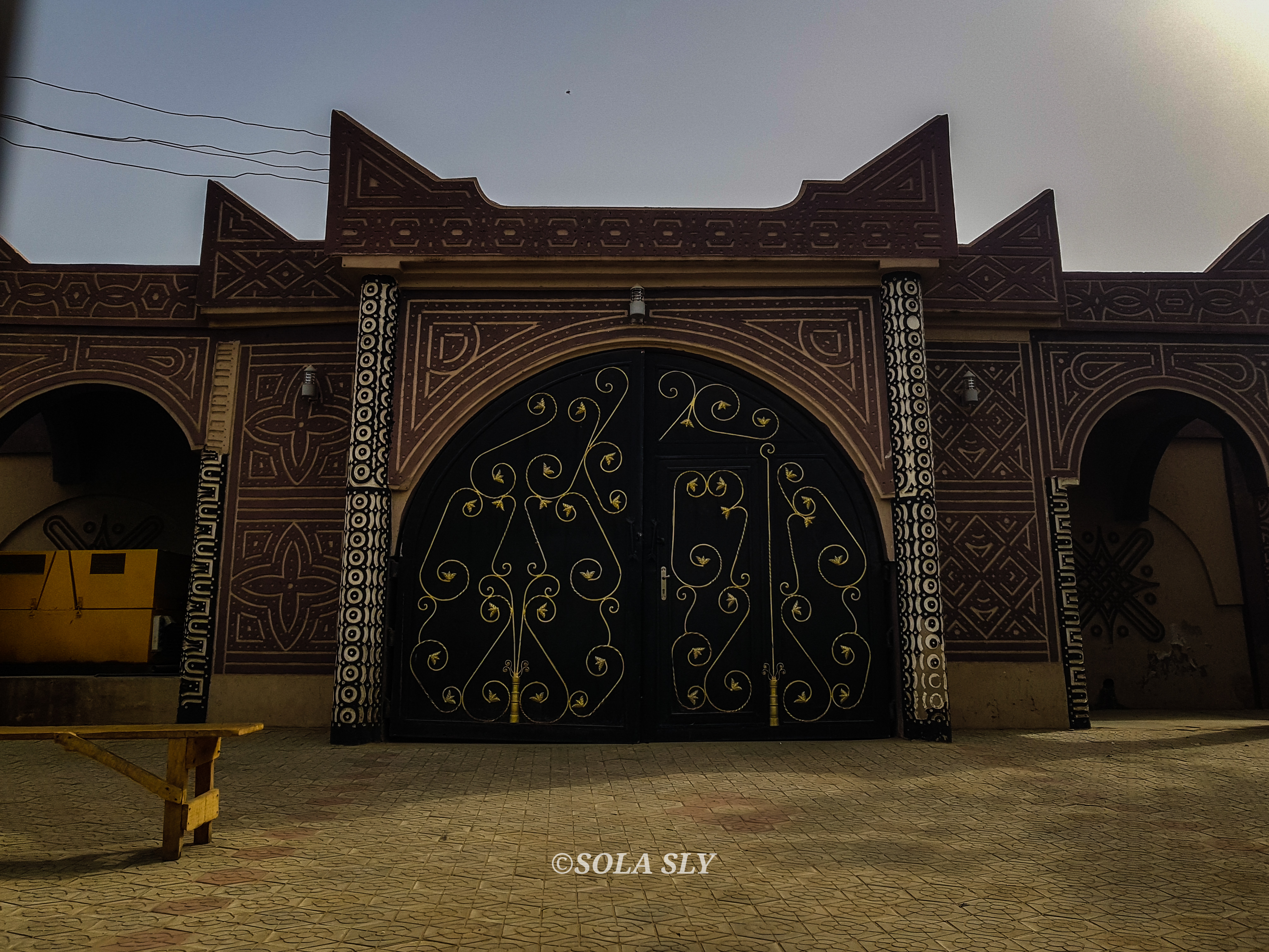
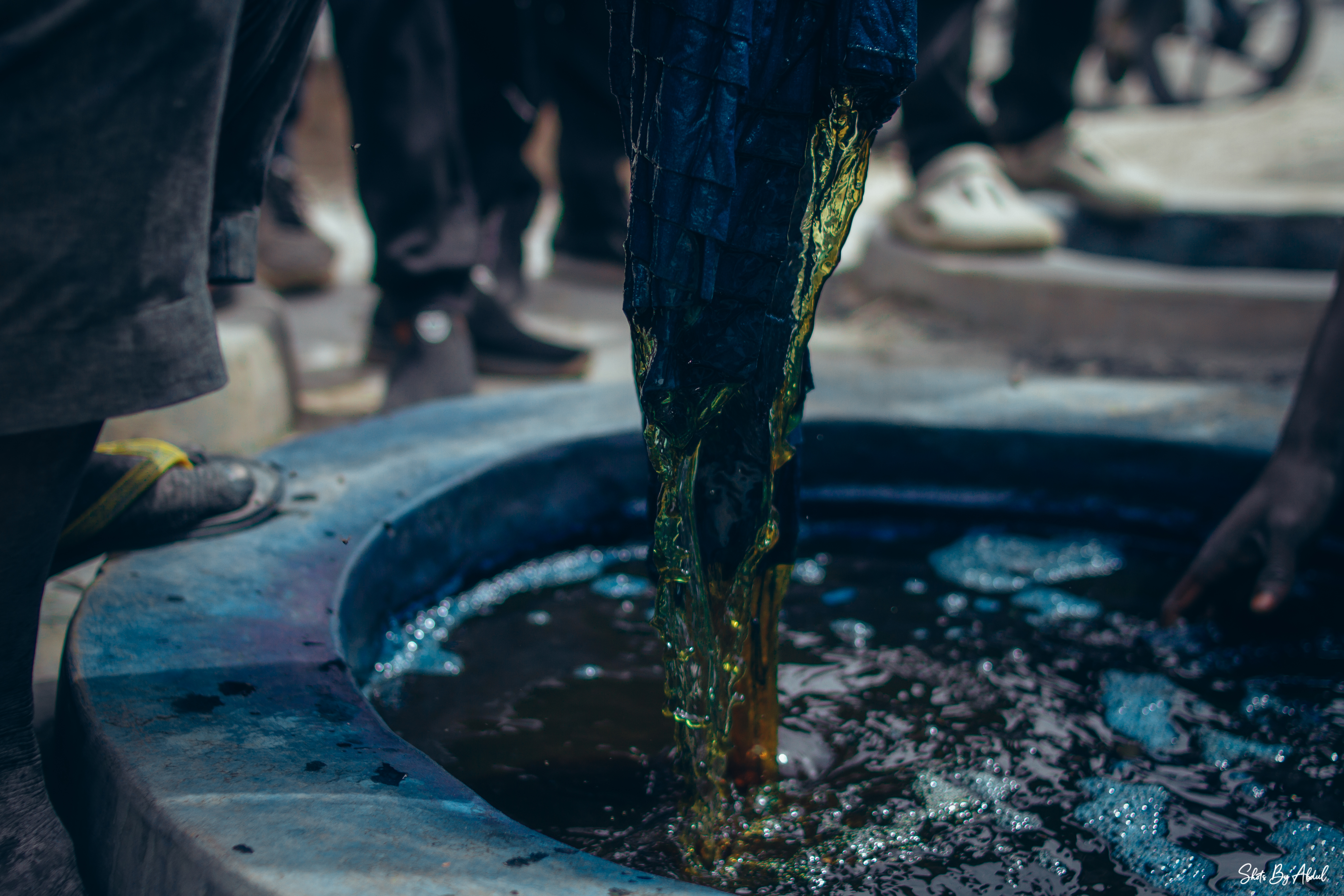
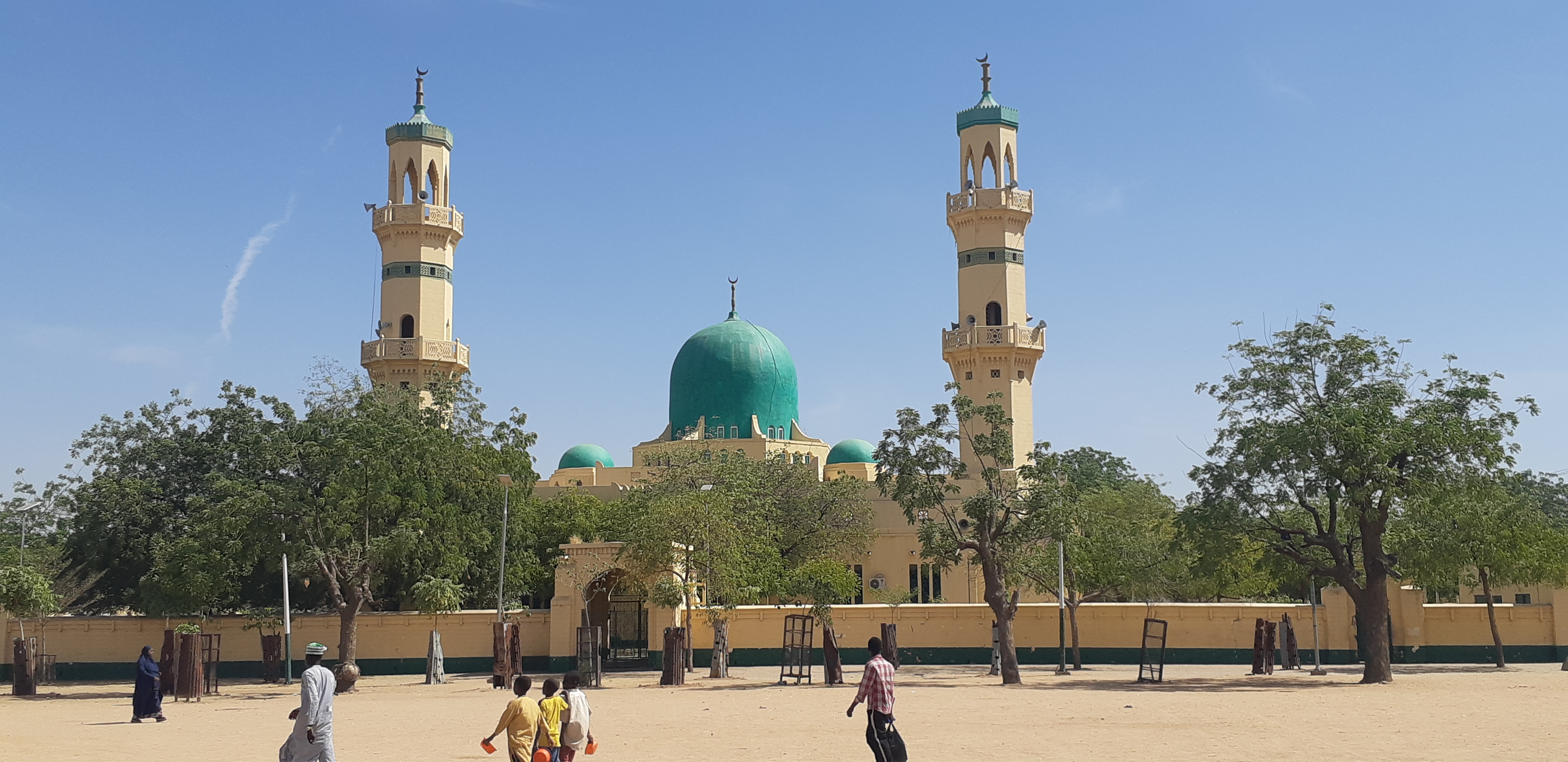
- Dalla Hill and direct view of the Old Town Ganuwa Gidan Rumfa Gidan Makama Museum Kofar Mata Dye Pits Great Mosque of Kano
- Interactive map of Kano
- Location within Nigeria Location within Africa
- Coordinates: 12°00′N 8°31′E
- Country: Nigeria
- State: Kano State
- LGAs: 8
- Founded: 999 CE
- Founder: Bayajidda

Government
  - Emir: Muhammadu Sunusi II

Area
  - City: 499 km^{2} (193 sq mi)
  - Urban: 251 km^{2} (97 sq mi)
- Elevation: 488 m (1,601 ft)

Population (2006 census)
  - City: 2,828,861
  - Estimate (2022): 4,103,000
  - Rank: 2nd
  - Density: 5,670/km^{2} (14,700/sq mi)
  - Urban: 4,224,966
  - Metro: 4,645,320

GDP (PPP, constant 2015 values)
  - Year: 2023
  - Total: $26.4 billion
  - Per capita: $6,100
- Time zone: UTC+1 (WAT)
- Climate: Aw
- Website: kanostate.gov.ng

Kano ( ; Ajami: كَنُواْ) is a city in northern Nigeria and the capital of Kano State. It is the second largest city in Nigeria after Lagos, with over four million citizens living within 449 km^{2} (173 sq mi). Located in the savanna, south of the Sahel, Kano is a major route of the trans-Saharan trade, having been a trade and human settlement for millennia. It is the traditional state of the Dabo dynasty who have ruled as emirs over the city-state since the 19th century. Kano Emirate Council is the current traditional institution inside the city boundaries of Kano, and under the authority of the Government of Kano State.

The city is one of the seven medieval Hausa kingdoms. The principal inhabitants of the city are the Hausa and Fulani people. Centuries before British colonization, Kano was strongly cosmopolitan with settled populations of Arab, Tuareg, and Kanuri and remains so with the Hausa language spoken as a lingua franca by over 70 million speakers in the region.

Islam arrived in the city in the 11th century or earlier primarily through the trans-Saharan trade. As a result, Kano became wealthy and the commercial nerve centre of the region and Northern Nigeria, and is still associated as the "centre of commerce".

== Etymology ==
Kano was originally known as Dala, after the hill, and was referred to as such until the end of the 15th century and the beginning of the 16th by Bornoan sources.

== History ==
=== Founding and Bagauda dynasty ===
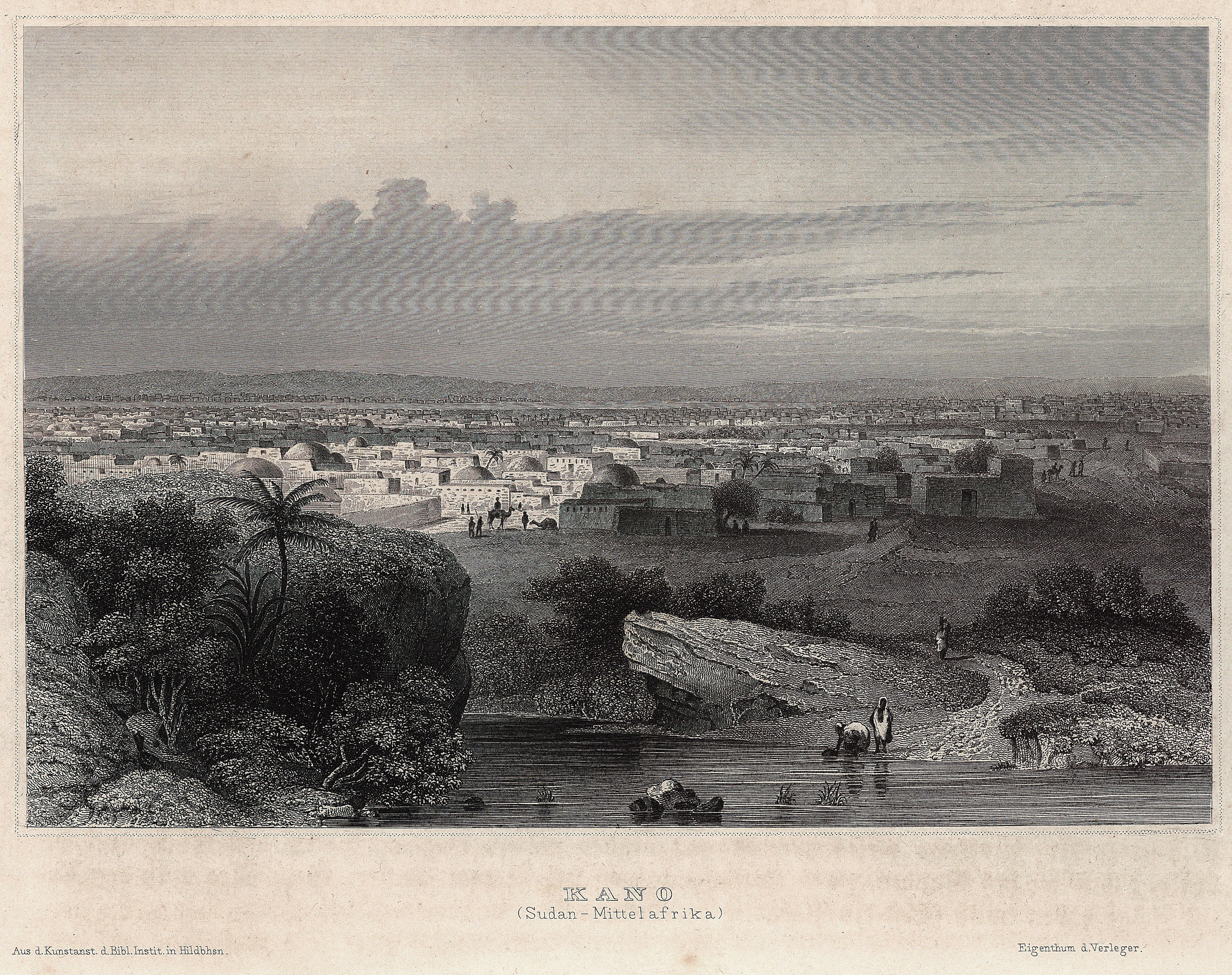
Landscape of Kano city in the 19th-century, Meyers Universum Lexikon

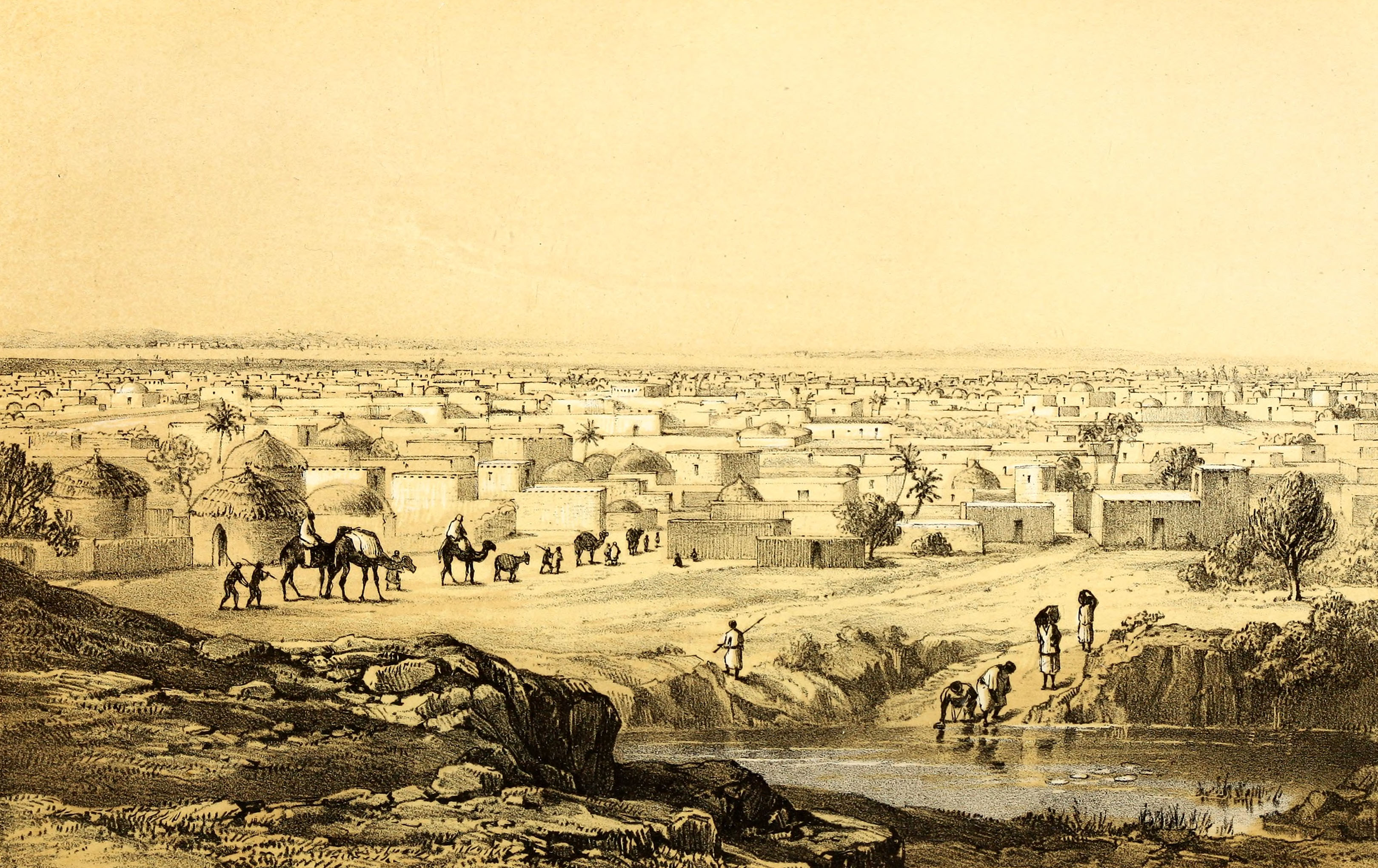
1857 lithograph of Kano, drawn after a sketch by Heinrich Barth

In the 7th century, Dala Hill, a residual hill in Kano, was the site of a hunting and gathering community that engaged in iron work (Nok culture); it is unknown whether these were Hausa people or speakers of Niger–Congo languages. The Kano Chronicle identifies Barbushe, a warrior priest of Dala Hill and a female spirit deity known as Tsumburbura. Barbushe was from the lineage of the hunter family (maparauta) who were the Maguzawa and the city's first settlers. They worshipped the deity Tsumburbura (Elizabeth Isichei notes that the description of Barbushe is similar to those of Sao people).

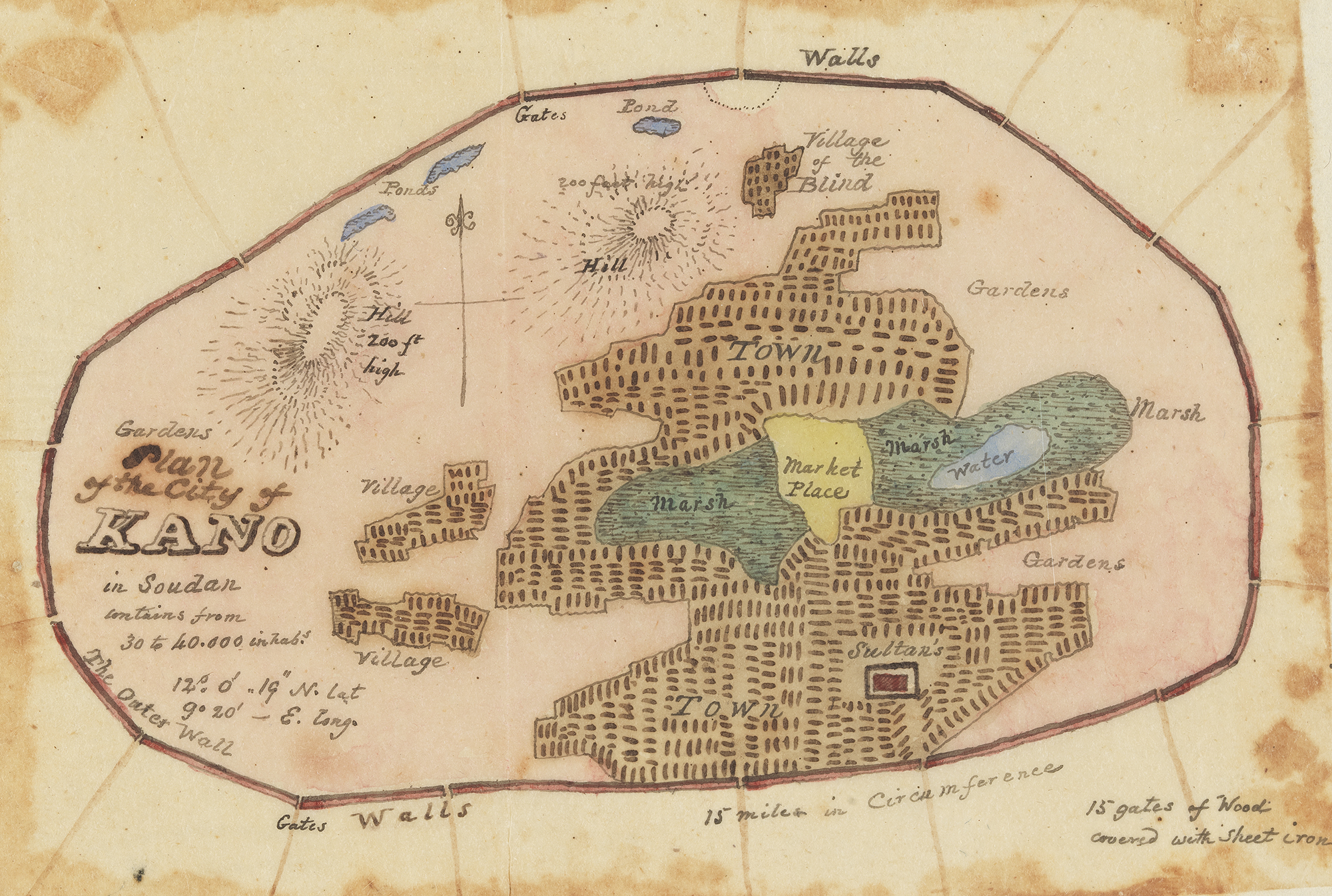
Plan of the city of Kano, Soudan, ca. 1836 by Thomas Scott

While small chiefdoms were previously present in the area, according to the Kano Chronicle, Bagauda son of Bawo and grandson of the mythical hero Bayajidda, became the first king of Kano in 999, reigning until 1063. His grandson Gijimasu (1095–1134), the third king, began building city walls (badala/ganuwa) at the foot of Dala Hill. His own son, Tsaraki (1136–1194), the fifth king, completed them during his reign.

Kano is one of the best-known historic Hausa city-states. According to the Kano Chronicle. These accounts indicate that Kano emerged early as a settlement connected to Dalla Hill and gradually developed into an urban and political center.

=== Middle Ages: spread of Islam and trade ===
In the 12th century, Ali Yaji from Kudawa lineage as King of Kano renounced his allegiance to the cult of Tsumburbura, converted to Islam and proclaimed the Sultanate that was to last until its fall in the 19th century. The reign of Yaji ensued an era of expansionism that saw Kano becoming the capital of a pseudo Habe Empire.

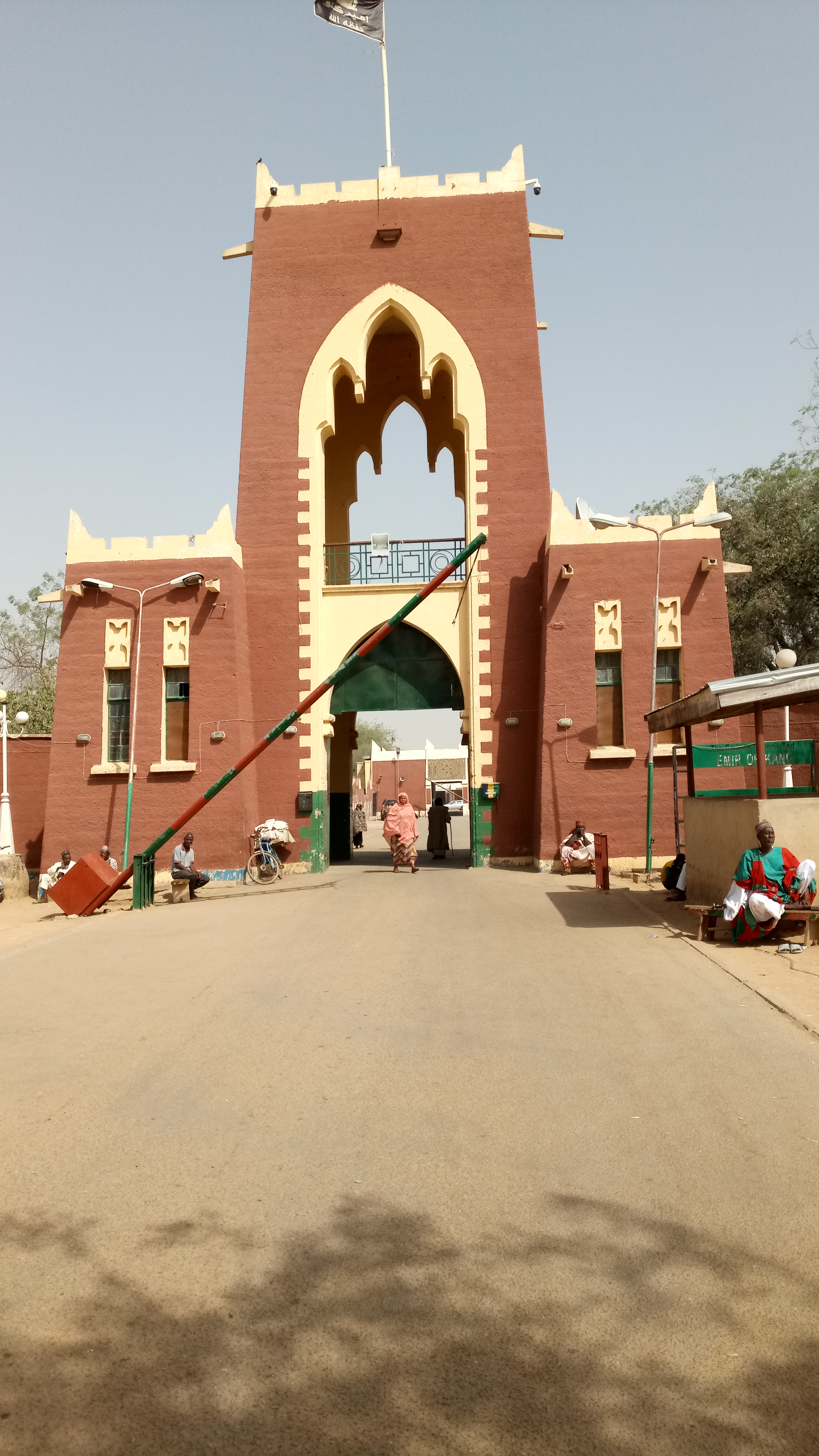
Gidan Rumfa built in the 15th century by Muhammadu Rumfa

In 1463, Muhammad Rumfa (reigned 1463–1499) ascended the throne. During his reign, political pressure from the rising Songhai Empire forced him to take Auwa, the daughter of Askiyah the Great as his wife. She was to later become the first female Madaki of Kano.

Rumfa was a rich and flamboyant king. Luxurious clothing and expensive ostrich feather shoes were common among government officials. The kakaki (a kind of trumpet) was also first used during his reign. His wealth is owed to Kano's commercial prosperity during this period. Kano arguably achieved the height of its reputation as an important trading center of the trans-Saharan trade in the Middle Ages during his reign. Leo Africanus's description of Kano is believed to be that of Rumfa's era. He described the locals as "wealthy merchants and skilled craftsmen" and commended the cavalry of the Sultan's army. He also noted the abundance of rice, corn, cotton and citrus fruits.

Rumfa reformed the city, expanded the Sahelian Gidan Rumfa (Emir's Palace), and played a role in the further Islamization of the city, as he urged prominent residents to convert and invited many prominent scholars to the city. He also built the walls of the city and the Kurmi market. The Kano Chronicle attributes a total of twelve "innovations" to Rumfa. According to the Kano Chronicle, the thirty-seventh Sarkin Kano (King of Kano) was Mohammed Sharef (1703–1731). His successor, Kumbari dan Sharefa (1731–1743), engaged in major battles with Sokoto as a longterm rivalry.

=== Kano under the Sokoto Caliphate ===
At the beginning of the 19th century, Fulani Islamic leader Usman dan Fodio led a jihad affecting much of central Sudan which demolished the Habe kingdom, leading to the emergence of the Sokoto Caliphate. In 1805 the last sultan of Kano was defeated by the Jobe Clan of the Fulani, and Kano became an Emirate of the Caliphate. Kano was already the largest and most prosperous province of the empire.

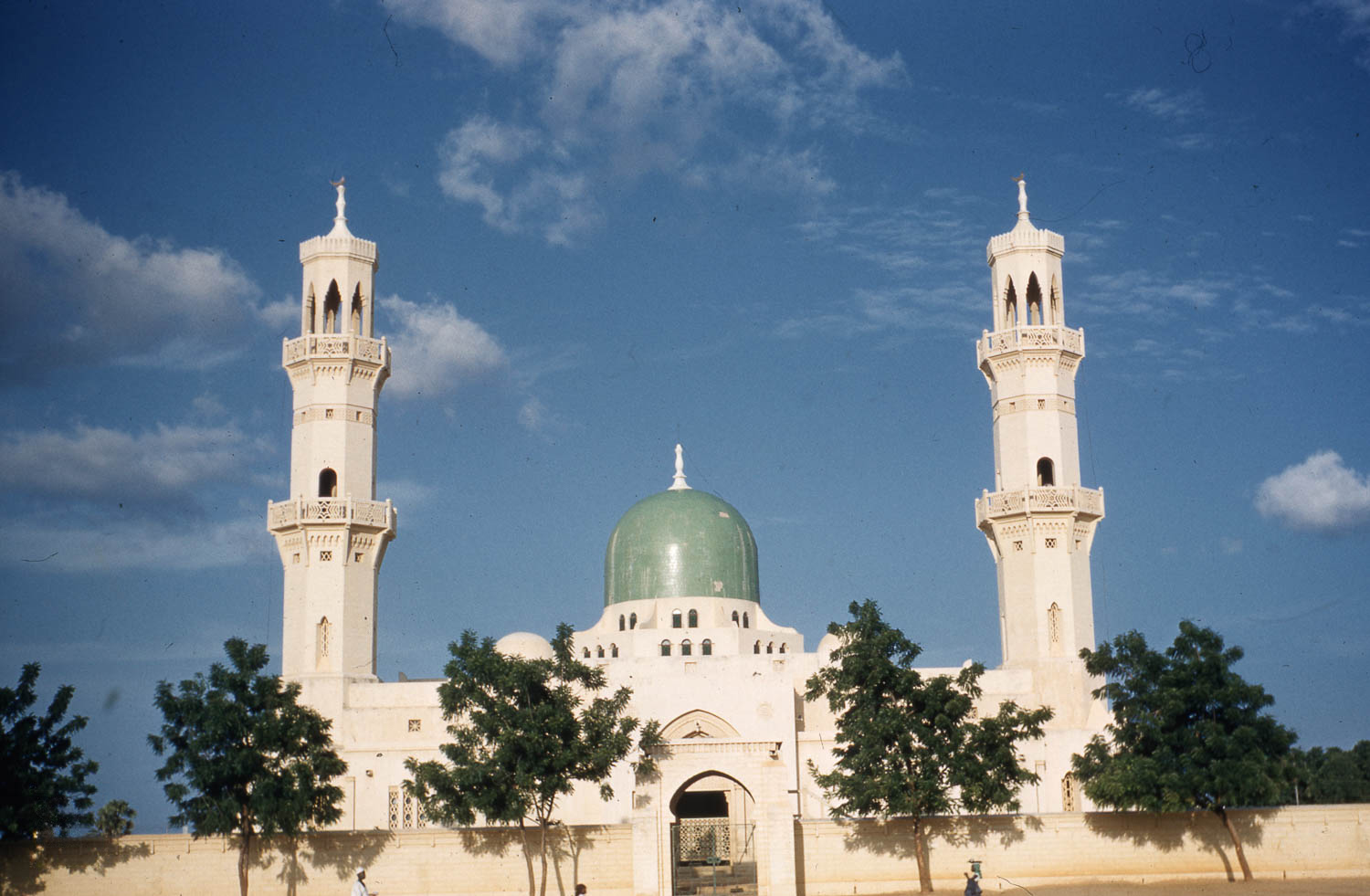
The Kano Central Mosque (1960). Constructed during the reign of Muhammad Rumfa (r. 1463–1499). Abdullahi dan Dabo (r. 1855–1883) oversaw its refurbishment in the mid-19th century, and further restoration efforts were undertaken in the 1950s.

The city suffered famines from 1807 to 1810, in the 1830s, 1847, 1855, 1863, 1873, 1884, and from 1889 until 1890.

During the 19th century when Kano came under the suzerainty of the Sokoto Caliphate, Kano prospered as the center of commercial activity. Weaving, dyeing and leatherwork were traded as far north as Morocco and thereafter to Europe. Its cotton cloth traded as far as Tripoli, Lake Chad, and Timbuktu.

In 1851, Heinrich Barth (a German scholar who spent several years in northern Nigeria in the 1850s) mentioned that Kano had a 10-mile long 30 ft high clay walls with a population of 30,000 with commerce and manufacturing abundant. He mentioned that "its huge market was a labyrinth of narrow alleys with everything sold from vegetables to slaves". He also called Kano the greatest emporium of central Africa and estimated the percentage of slaves in Kano to be at least 50%, most of whom lived in slave villages. This was one of the last major slave societies, with high percentages of enslaved population long after the Atlantic slave trade had been cut off.

From 1893 until 1895, two rival claimants to the throne fought a civil war, or Basasa. With the help of royal slaves, Yusufu was victorious over his brother Tukur and claimed the title of emir.

=== British conquest, colonial indirect rule, and independence ===
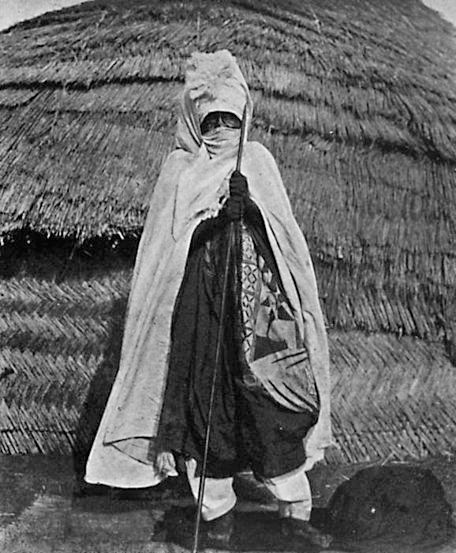
Muhammad Abbas first emir to reign after the Battle of Kano

In March 1903, the city-state was absorbed into the British Empire after the Battle of Kano, the Fort of Kano was captured by the British, It quickly replaced Lokoja as the administrative centre of Northern Nigeria. It was replaced as the centre of government by Zungeru and later Kaduna, and only regained administrative significance with the creation of Kano State following Nigerian independence.

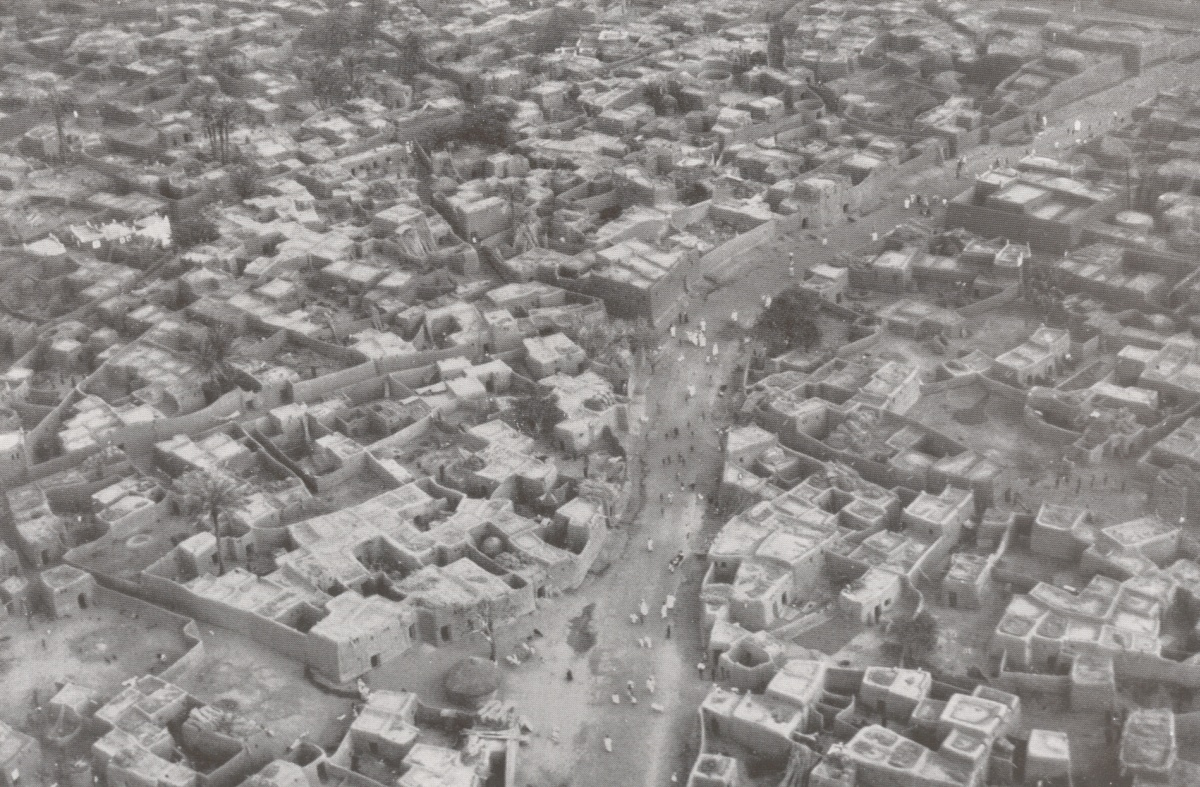
Kano in December 1930. Air photo taken by Swiss pilot and photographer Walter Mittelholzer.

A 1903 British newspaper commentary described Kano as the ‘Manchester of Nigeria’ and emphasized its reputation for textile manufacturing and indigo dyeing.

From 1913 to 1914, as the peanut business was expanding and Groundnut pyramids became more prominent in Kano City, Kano suffered a major drought, which caused a famine. Other famines broke out in the region in 1908, 1920, 1927, 1943, 1951, 1956, and 1958. By 1922, groundnut trader Alhassan Dantata had become the richest businessman in the Kano Emirate, surpassing fellow merchants Umaru Sharubutu Koki and Maikano Agogo.

In May 1953, an inter-ethnic riot arose due to southern newspapers misreporting on the nature of a disagreement between northern and southern politicians in the House of Representatives. Thousands of Nigerians of southern origin died as a result a politically sparked riot.

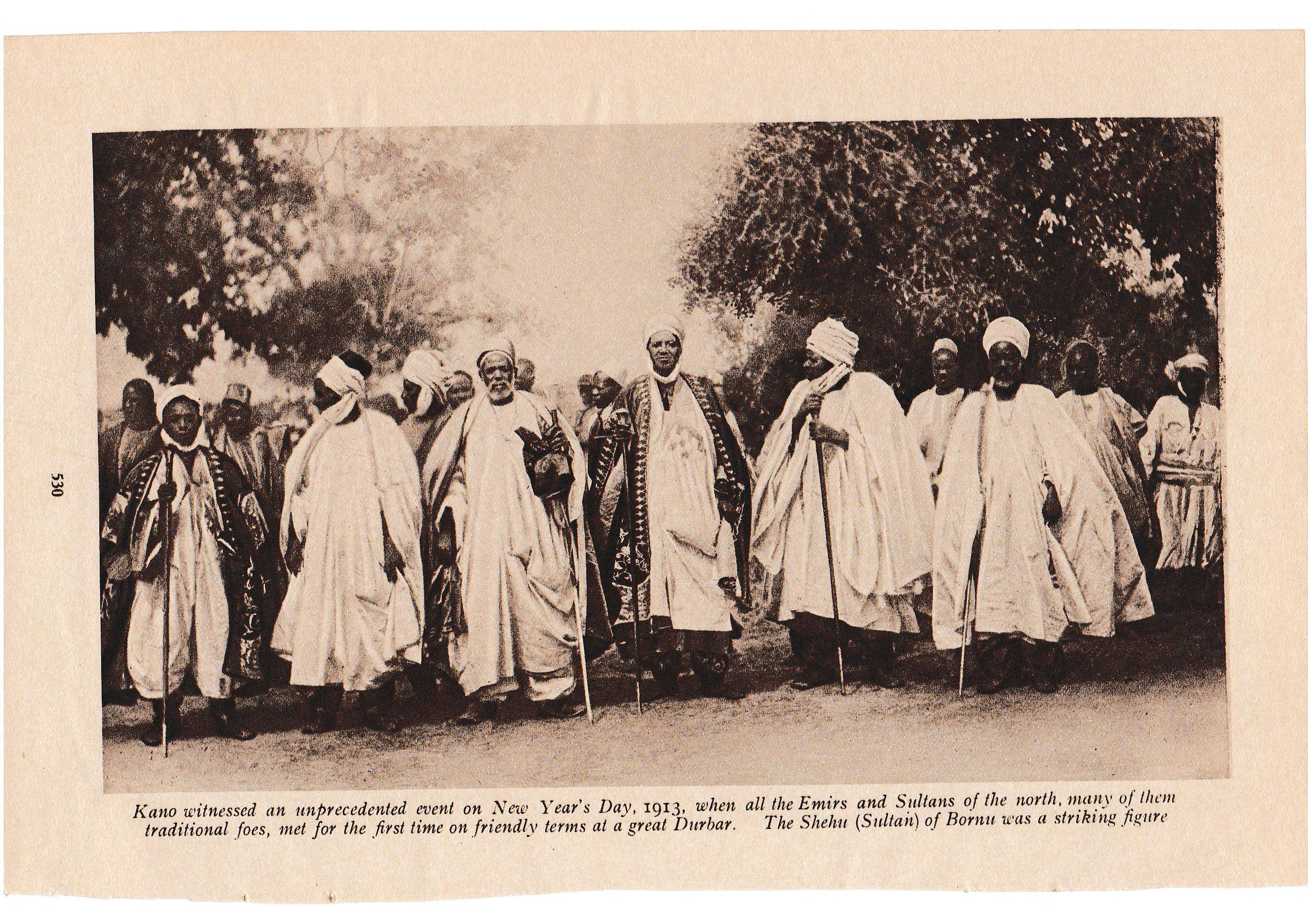
Six Emirs at a meeting in Kano (c. 1913)

Ado Bayero became emir of Kano in 1963. Kano state was created in 1967 from the then Northern Nigeria by the Federal military government. The first military police commissioner, Audu Bako, is credited with building a solid foundation for the progress of a modern society. He started a lot of development projects—network of roads, a reliable urban water supply. He was a keen farmer himself and funded construction of number of dams to provide irrigation. Thanks to his policies, Kano produced all types of produce and export it to the neighbouring states. The first civilian governor was Abubakar Rimi.

In December 1980, radical preacher Mohammed Marwa Maitatsine led a riot. He was killed by security forces, but his followers later started uprisings in other northern cities.

=== 21st century ===
After the introduction of sharia law in Kano State in the early 2000s, many Christians left the city. 100 people were killed in riots over the sharia issue during October 2001.

In November 2007, political violence broke out in the city after the People's Democratic Party (PDP) accused the All Nigeria Peoples Party (ANPP) of rigging the November 17 local government elections. (The ANPP won in 36 of the state's 44 local Government Areas.) Hundreds of youths took to the streets, over 300 of whom were arrested; at least 25 people were killed. Buildings set on fire include a sharia police station, an Islamic centre, and a council secretariat. 280 federal soldiers were deployed around the city.

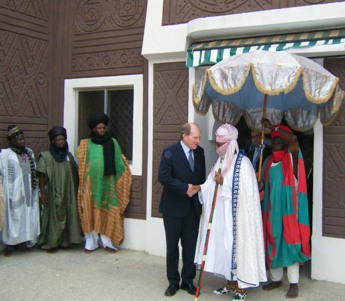
Emir Ado Bayero and Robert Dewar the British high commissioner, 2009

In January 2012, a series of bomb attacks killed up to 162 people. Four police stations, the State Security Service headquarters, passport offices and immigration centres were attacked. Jihadist insurgents Boko Haram claimed responsibility. After the bombings, Kano was placed under curfew. The Boko Haram insurgency continued with mass murders in March 2013, November 2014 and February 2015.

On 6 June 2014, Emir Ado Bayero who reigned as Emir of Kano for over five decades died, and a succession crisis loomed amongst the royal family. On 8 June 2014, Sanusi Lamido Sanusi a grandson of former Emir Muhammadu Sanusi I emerged as the new Emir of Kano. His accession led to widespread protests from supporters of Sanusi Ado Bayero the Chiroman Kano (Crown Prince) and son of the late Emir Ado Bayero, with allegations that Governor Rabiu Kwankwaso interfered with the king-making process.

In 2019, Governor Abdullahi Umar Ganduje balkanized the traditional Kano Emirate into four new emirates; Bichi, Rano, Gaya and Karaye. This unprecedented move was criticized by elders. According to the law, out of the 44 local government areas in the state, Sanusi as Emir of Kano will preside over just 10 local government areas; with the remainder carved up amongst the new emirates. On 9 March 2020, Sanusi was dethroned by Governor Abdullahi Ganduje. The emir was immediately moved to detention under heavy security escort to an apartment in awe, Nasarawa state. It took the intervention of the federal high court in Abuja to order his release from detention in Nasarawa.

=== Culture and landmarks ===
The core history of Kano contains several notable cultural and architectural landmarks, including the Gidan Makama Museum Kano, the Gidan Rumfa, Dala Hill, Kano Emirate Council, Kurmi Market, the Great Mosque of Kano, and the surviving portions of the Ancient Kano City Walls, and corresponding Gates of Hausa kingdoms. The Kofar Mata Dye Pits and the Groundnut pyramids are among the city's most famous traditional craft sites and are widely recognized in both historical and recent literature as important symbols of Kano's textile heritage.

=== Legacy ===
Kano occupies a central place in the history of Hausaland, northern Nigeria, Sahelian kingdoms, and trans-Saharan trade. Its long association with trade, urban state formation, Islamic scholarship, fortified architecture, and craft production has made it one of the most studied cities in West African history. Modern scholarship generally treats Kano not simply as a colonial conquest site, but as a major precolonial and colonial-era commercial metropolis whose influence extended far beyond present-day northern Nigeria.

== Geography ==
=== Location ===
The city lies south of the Sahara Desert in the Sudanian Savanna region that stretches across the south of the Sahel. The city lies near where the Kano and Challawa rivers flowing from the southwest converge to form the Hadejia River, which eventually flows into Lake Chad to the east.

=== Climate ===
Kano is 481 metres (1,578 feet) above sea level. Kano has a tropical savanna climate (Köppen Aw). The city has on average about 980 mm (38.6 in) of precipitation per year, the large majority of which falls from June through September. Like the vast majority of Nigeria, Kano is very hot for most of the year, peaking in April. From December through February, the city is less hot, with morning temperatures during the months of December, January and February averaging between 14 and 16 °C (57.2 and 60.8 °F).

Climate data for Kano (1991–2020)
Month	Jan	Feb	Mar	Apr	May	Jun	Jul	Aug	Sep	Oct	Nov	Dec	Year
Record high °C (°F)	39.0 (102.2)	41.0 (105.8)	42.4 (108.3)	44.0 (111.2)	44.8 (112.6)	41.6 (106.9)	38.5 (101.3)	34.2 (93.6)	39.0 (102.2)	39.0 (102.2)	39.0 (102.2)	37.3 (99.1)	44.8 (112.6)
Mean daily maximum °C (°F)	29.4 (84.9)	33.1 (91.6)	37.0 (98.6)	39.5 (103.1)	38.2 (100.8)	34.8 (94.6)	31.7 (89.1)	30.3 (86.5)	32.1 (89.8)	34.5 (94.1)	33.7 (92.7)	30.3 (86.5)	33.7 (92.7)
Daily mean °C (°F)	21.3 (70.3)	24.7 (76.5)	28.8 (83.8)	32.0 (89.6)	31.8 (89.2)	29.2 (84.6)	26.9 (80.4)	25.9 (78.6)	27.1 (80.8)	27.7 (81.9)	25.0 (77.0)	21.9 (71.4)	26.9 (80.4)
Mean daily minimum °C (°F)	13.2 (55.8)	16.4 (61.5)	20.5 (68.9)	24.6 (76.3)	25.4 (77.7)	23.7 (74.7)	22.2 (72.0)	21.5 (70.7)	22.0 (71.6)	20.9 (69.6)	16.3 (61.3)	13.5 (56.3)	20.0 (68.0)
Record low °C (°F)	5.0 (41.0)	8.0 (46.4)	10.0 (50.0)	12.5 (54.5)	18.3 (64.9)	14.1 (57.4)	15.0 (59.0)	14.5 (58.1)	14.1 (57.4)	13.0 (55.4)	6.5 (43.7)	4.9 (40.8)	4.9 (40.8)
Average precipitation mm (inches)	0.0 (0.0)	0.0 (0.0)	0.3 (0.01)	14.0 (0.55)	70.1 (2.76)	160.4 (6.31)	306.9 (12.08)	400.4 (15.76)	175.2 (6.90)	21.8 (0.86)	0.0 (0.0)	0.0 (0.0)	1,149.2 (45.24)
Average precipitation days (≥ 1 mm)	0.0	0.0	0.1	0.8	4.0	7.7	11.4	14.2	8.4	1.6	0	0	48.2
Average relative humidity (%)	25.3	20.3	18.8	29.7	46.1	56.8	66.2	75.6	72.5	56.0	35.6	30.3	44.4
Mean monthly sunshine hours	245	232	239	234	264	261	229	220	240	267	264	260	2,955
Mean daily sunshine hours	8	8	8	8	9	9	7	7	8	9	9	8	8
Source: NOAA (sunshine 1961–1990)

=== LGAs ===
Metropolitan Kano has eight local governments:

Local Government Area	Area (in km^{2})	Population (2006 Census)	Population (2022 estimate)	Density (2022, per km^{2})
Dala	13.90	418,759	688,700	49,547
Fagge	35.27	200,095	329,100	9,331
Gwale	36.09	357,827	588,500	16,306
Kano Municipal	14.90	371,243	610,600	40,980
Kumbotso	186.7	294,391	484,200	2,593
Nasarawa	48.72	317,614	980,900	20,133
Tarauni	23.16	221,844	364,900	15,756
Ungogo	214.5	365,737	601,500	2,804
Metropolitan Kano	573.24	2,828,861	4,648,400	8,109

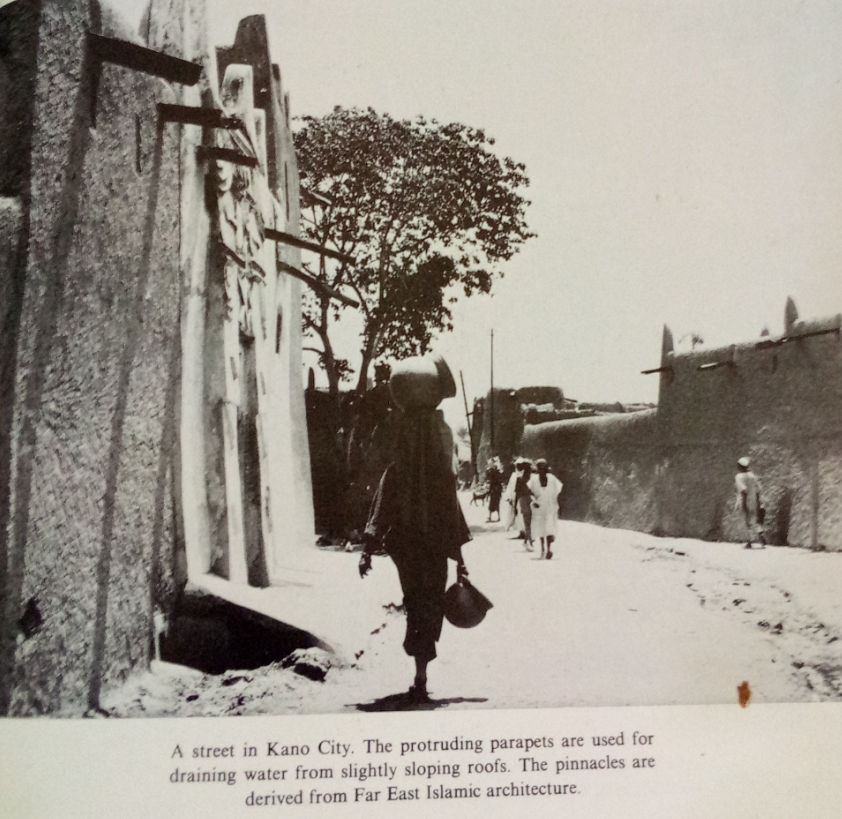
Ancient street in Kano

== Economy ==
The economic history of Kano dates back to the Middle Ages when the city served as the southernmost point of the famous trans-Sahara trade routes. Kano was well connected with many cities in North Africa and some cities in southern Europe. By 1851, the city of Kano produced 10 million pairs of sandals and 5 million tanned hides annually for export, with other products including textile materials, leather and grains. Kano was connected with trans-Atlantic trade in 1911 when a railway line reached Kano. Kano is a major centre for the production and export of agricultural products like hides, skins, peanuts, and cotton.

The city maintains its economy and business even in the 21st century, with it producing the richest man in Africa—Aliko Dangote—whose great-grandfather Alhassan Dantata was the richest West African in the mid 20th century. Over the years, inconsistent government policies and sporadic electricity supply hampered manufacturing and industry, so that Kano's economy relies primarily on trade, retail and services. There are plans to establish an information technology park in the city.

== Culture ==
=== Equestrianism ===
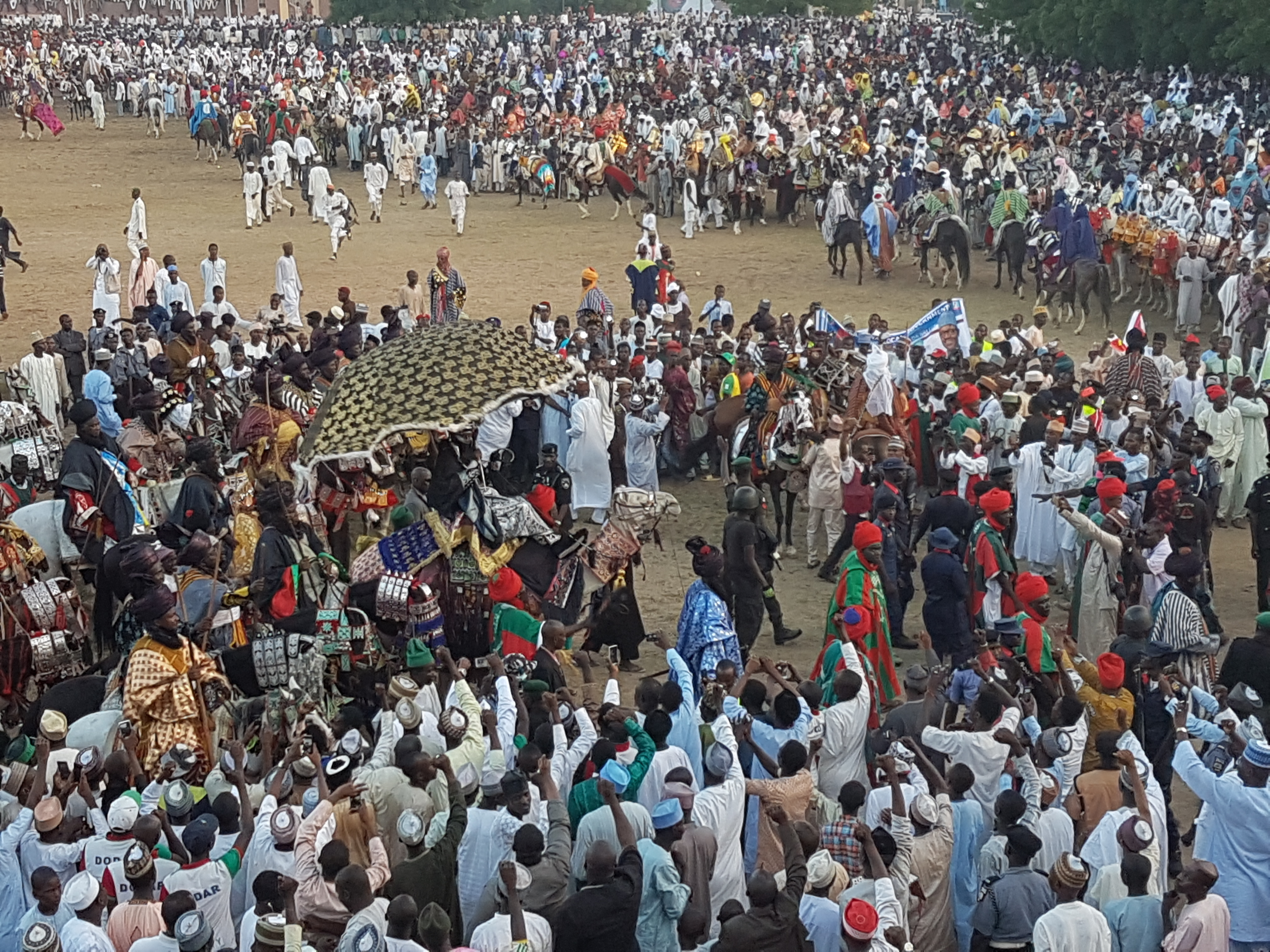
Durbar Festival in Kano

Kano is traditionally an equestrian society and this is manifested during the annual Durbar festival to mark and celebrate the two annual Muslim festivals Eid al-Fitr (to mark the end of the Holy Month of Ramadan) and Eid al-Adha (to mark the Hajj Holy Pilgrimage). Kano Durbar Festival is the Nigeria's Most Spectacular Horseparade that marks a celebration of northern Nigeria's cultural treasure. The festival begins with skilled horsemen from the royal court and aristocrats being accompanied by musicians, artillerymen, and traditional circus in a procession of highly rich and colorful style through the city on the way to the emir's palace. Once assembled near the palace, the horsemen separate into their respective groups, each under the banner of district head (hakimai) or a titled nobleman from the emir's court (masarauta), take it in turns to charge toward the emir, pulling up just feet in front of the seated dignitaries to offer their respect and allegiance. During the festival, the emir makes a beautiful appearance in different colors dressed and adorned with the attire of a king.

For the first time in 200 years, the durban horse festival was cancelled in 2012 due to the bad health condition of the Emir of Kano. Some analysts suggested that the cancellation could also be attributed to the rising deadly Boko haram attacks in the northern part of Nigeria at that time.

=== Architecture ===
Kano's architecture over the years has seen wide variations, especially from the traditional architecture to modern architecture. The city is a leading axis of Sudano-Sahelian architecture, developing the local Tubali style which manifested in mosques, walls, common compounds, and gates.

The design exteriorization of building façades was and is still widely used in Kano architecture, with the city harboring several skilled artisans.

== Landmarks ==
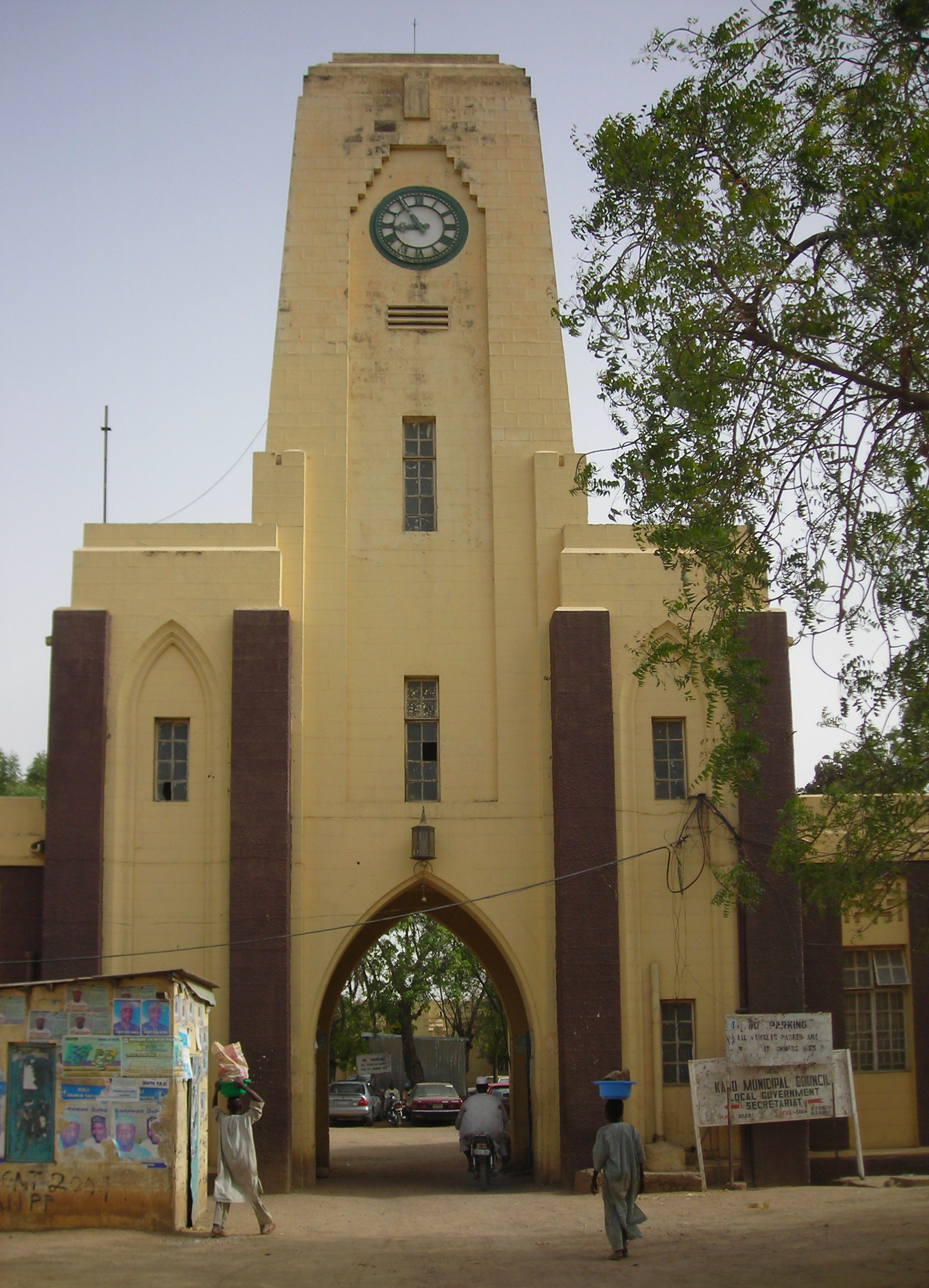
Kano municipal council gate (2009)

=== Old City ===
Formerly walled, most of the gates to the Old City survive. The Old City houses the vast Kurmi Market, known for its crafts, while old dye pits—still in use—lie nearby. In the Old City are the Emir's Palace, the Great Mosque, and the Gidan Makama Museum.

=== Places of worship ===
Among the places of worship, they are predominantly Muslims mosques.

There are also Christian churches for several denominations including :

- Church of Nigeria (Anglican Communion);
- Roman Catholic Diocese of Kano (Catholic Church);
- Nigerian Baptist Convention (Baptist World Alliance);
- Presbyterian Church of Nigeria (World Communion of Reformed Churches);
- Pentecostal megachurches including; Assemblies of God, Living Faith Church Worldwide; Redeemed Christian Church of God

=== Fortifications ===
The Ancient Kano City Walls were built as a defensive wall with the construction of the foundation laid by Sarki Gijimasu (r. 1095–1134), the third king of the Kingdom of Kano in the Kano Chronicle. In the mid 14th century during the reign of Zamnagawa, the wall was completed before it was further expanded during the 16th century. According to historians, the then General-Governor of the Colony and Protectorate of Nigeria, Fredrick Lugard, wrote in a 1903 report about the Kano Walls that he had "never seen anything like it in Africa" after capturing the ancient city of Kano along with British forces.

=== Old palaces and residences ===
Many old royal residences have also survived to this day, mainly within the old city and its surroundings. Such private houses include the Gidan Chiroma, Filin Chiranchi, and others. Larger palaces, include the Gidan Rumfa, Gidan Makama, and winter retreat for the emir.

== Education ==
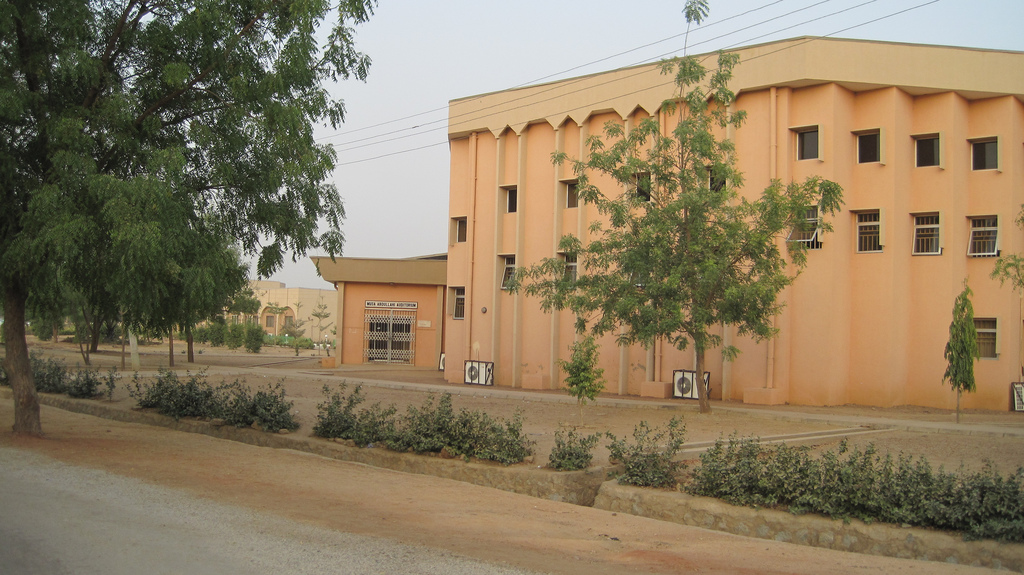
Bayero University Kano campus

=== Universities ===
- The Bayero University Kano is the oldest university in the city. The seed of the university was the Ahmadu Bello College set up in 1962 by Isa Kaita. It was raised to the status of University College in 1975, with the right to award degrees on behalf of Ahmadu Bello University until 1980. It became a federal university in 1977, and remains an important institution of learning today.
- Sa'adatu Rimi University of Education Kano
- Skyline University Nigeria (SUN), founded in 2018.
- Yusuf Maitama Sule University, Kano (YUSMUK), founded in 2012.

=== Colleges ===
- Kano State Polytechnic was founded in 1975.
- Federal College of Education, Kano
- Aminu Kano College of Islamic Legal Studies, Kano

== Transport ==
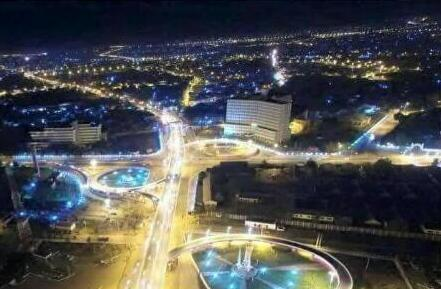
Kano at night

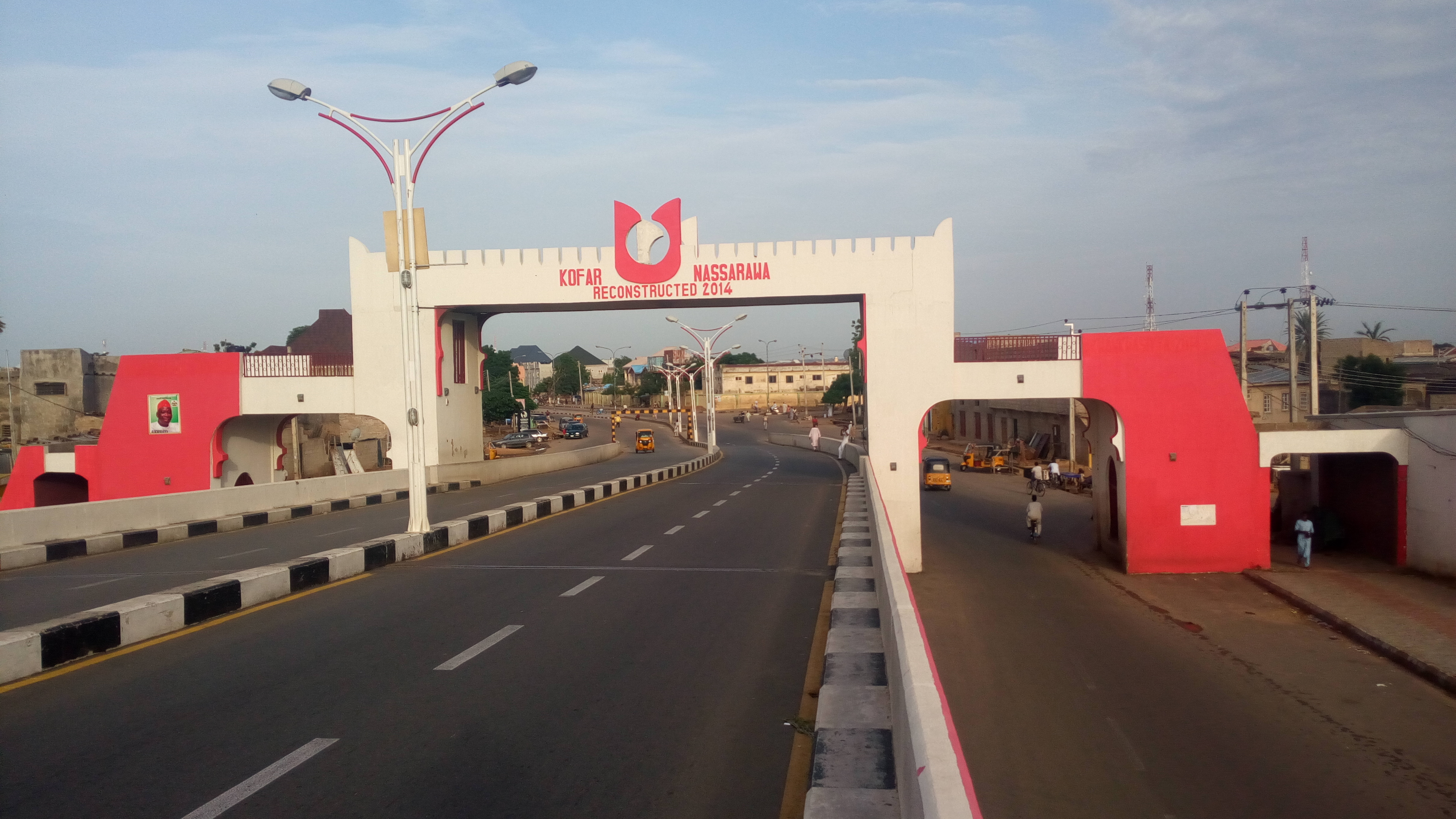
Ancient City Gate of Kano City rebuilt in 2014

Kano houses a railway station with trains to Lagos routed through Kaduna, while Mallam Aminu Kano International Airport lies nearby. The city is supplied with water by the nearby Challawa Gorge Dam, which is being considered as a source of hydro power. Because Kano is north of the rail junction at Kaduna, it has equal access to the seaports at Lagos and Port Harcourt.

The airline Kabo Air had its head office in the city. Kano was also headquarters of Azman Airlines and is the headquarters city of Max Air. Egypt Air, Ethiopian Airlines, Saudia and Qatar Airways serve as International airlines for both cargo and Passenger trips and various independent travel agencies. After a hiatus of many years, the railway line from Kano to Lagos was rehabilitated by 2013. The train trip to Lagos takes 30 hours and costs the equivalent of US$12, only a quarter of the equivalent bus fare.

In 2014, a new double track, standard gauge line is under construction from Lagos.

In 2017, a 74-km, four-line light rail network was announced by the Kano State Ministry of Works, Housing & Transport; with a US$1.8 billion contract signed with China Railway Construction Corporation.

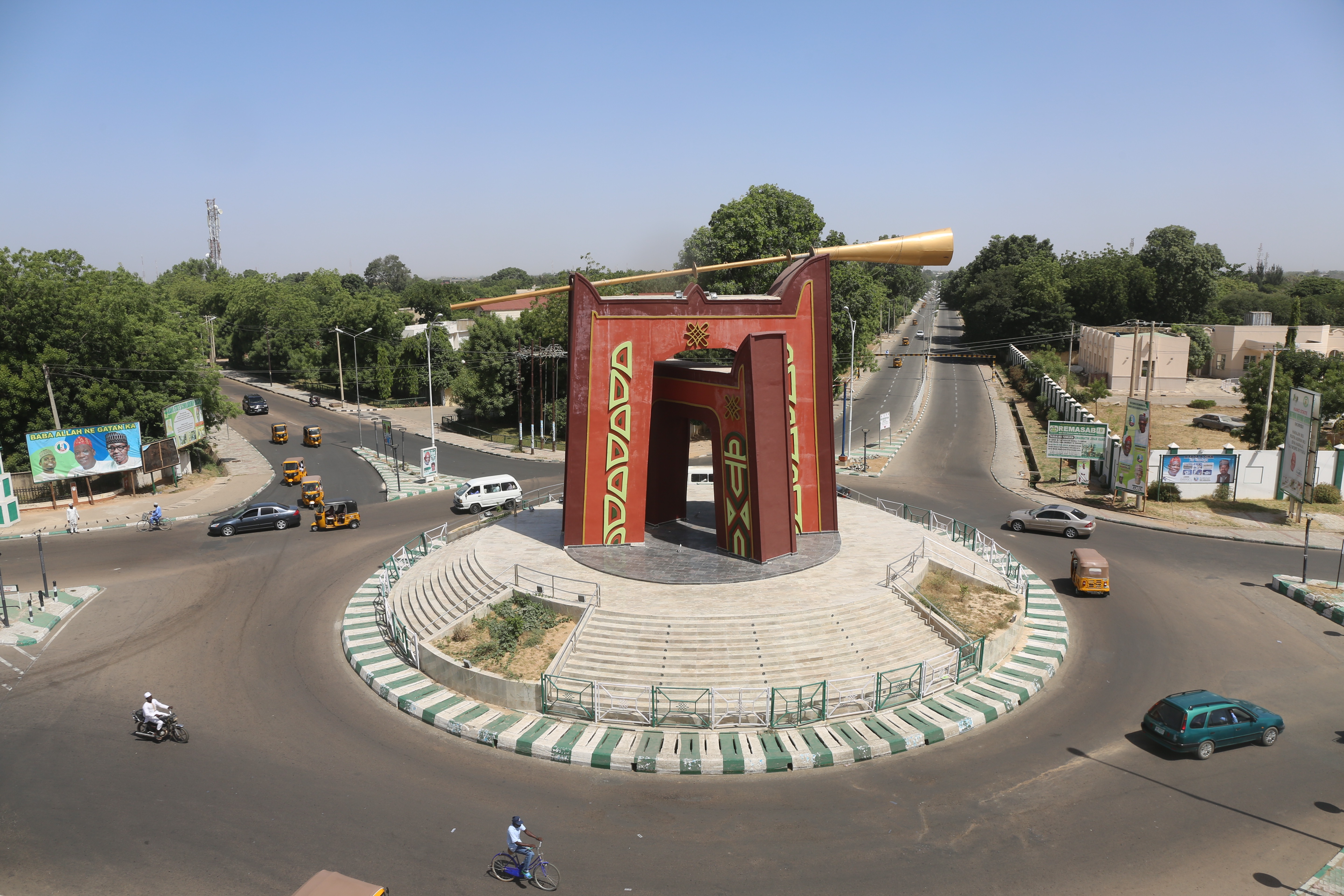
Kano Golden Jubilee Roundabout designed by Kaltume Gana

Two trans-African automobile routes pass through Kano:

- Algiers-Lagos Highway
- Dakar-Ndjamena Highway

From 2006 to 2015, backed by high oil prices, major highways, overhead bridges and other transportation infrastructure were built by the state government. The most notable of these are the Silver Jubilee flyover bridge at Kofar Nassarawa, the Kofar Kabuga underpass and various 6-lane highways in the city. In 2020, the Vice president of Nigeria Yemi Osibanjo was in Kano to commission the Alhassan Dantata flyover along Murtala Muhammad Way and Tijjani Hashim underpass way, Kofar Ruwa.

== Notable people ==
- Sani Abacha, former Nigerian Head of State
- Lawan Musa Abdullahi, lawyer and politician
- Ado Bayero - Emir of Kano from 1963 to 2014
- Aminu Ado Bayero - Emir of Kano from 2020 to 2024
- Aliko Dangote, entrepreneur.
- Alhassan Dantata, businessman
- Abdullahi Umar Ganduje, former Kano State Governor and former APC party chairman
- Aminu Kano, teacher, politician and reformer
- Rabiu Kwankwaso, politician, former Governor of Kano State, Senator in the Nigerian Senate and Minister of Defense
- Sussan Ley, Leader of the Opposition of Australia from 2025 to 2026
- Murtala Muhammed, former Head of State, Federal Republic of Nigeria.
- Abdul Samad Rabiu, entrepreneur
- Isyaku Rabiu, businessman
- Auwalu Abdullahi Rano, Businessman and entrepreneur
- Abubakar Rimi, former Governor of Kano state.
- Sanusi Lamido Sanusi, banker
- Ibrahim Shekarau, politician, former Governor of Kano State, Minister of Education, and Nigerian Senate
- Abdullahi Aliyu Sumaila, bureaucrat and politician.
- Alhassan Yusuf, footballer, currently plays for New England Revolution

== See also ==
- Gwagwarwa
- Kano Emirate Council
