= Auwalu =

Auwalu may refer to:

== People ==
=== First name ===
- Auwalu Abdullahi Rano (born 1974), Nigerian businessman
- Auwalu Sani, Nigerian politician

=== Last name ===
- Sarki Auwalu (born 1955), Nigerian chemical engineer
