= Kumbari dan Sharefa =

Kumbari dan Sharefa (reigned 1731–1743) was a Hausa King (Sarkin) of Kano. He succeeded Mohammed Sharef and is remembered for his high taxation on the Kurmi Market.
