= Gwagwarwa =

Gwagwarwa is a slum in Nigeria. It is a suburb of Kano in Kano State, Nigeria. It is East of the old city of Kano. It is ethnically mixed. To an extent there was spillover from the Sabon Gari in the early 1960s. In the 1960s, it exceeded 10,000 residents. At least at that point, it had a low status. It was inhabited by Haussa and Ibo. The name means brigade.
