= Great Mosque of Kano =

Mosque in Kano, Nigeria

- الجامع الكبير في كانو
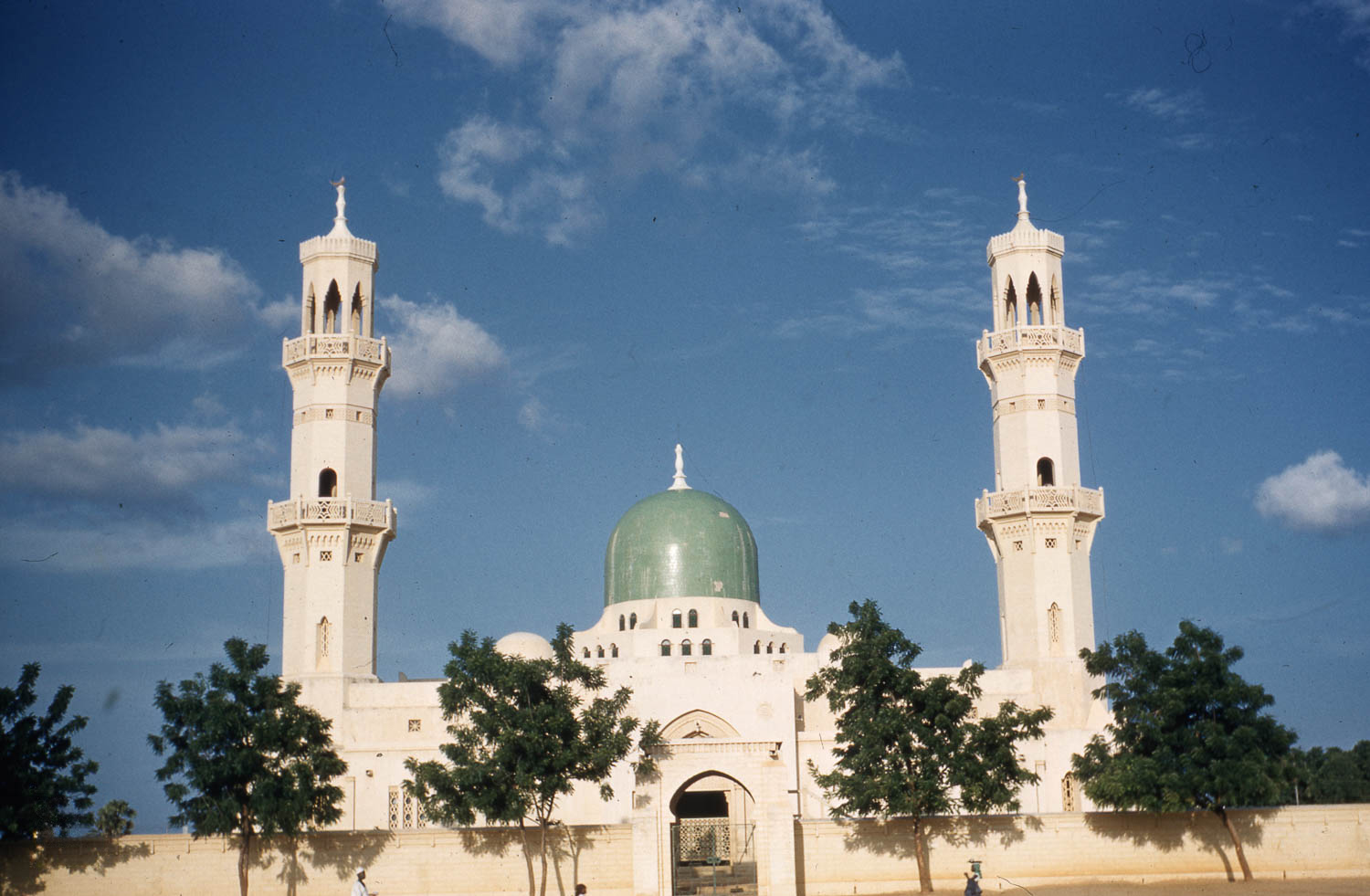
- The Kano central mosque in 1960. Taken by Dr. Mary Gillham

- Location within Nigeria

Religion
- Affiliation: Sunni Islam
- Ecclesiastical or organisational status: Mosque
- Status: Active

Location
- Location: Kano, Kano state
- Country: Nigeria
- Interactive map of Great Mosque of Kano
- Administration: Emirate Council
- Coordinates: 11°59′41″N 8°31′03″E

Architecture
- Type: Mosque
- Founder: Muhammad Rumfa
- Established: 15th century

Specifications
- Dome: 7
- Minaret: 2
- Minaret height: 20 m (66 ft)

The Great Mosque of Kano (Arabic: الجامع الكبير في كانو) is a general Jumaat mosque in Kano, the capital city of Kano State and the second most populous city in Nigeria. The mosque is situated at the heart of the city.

== History ==
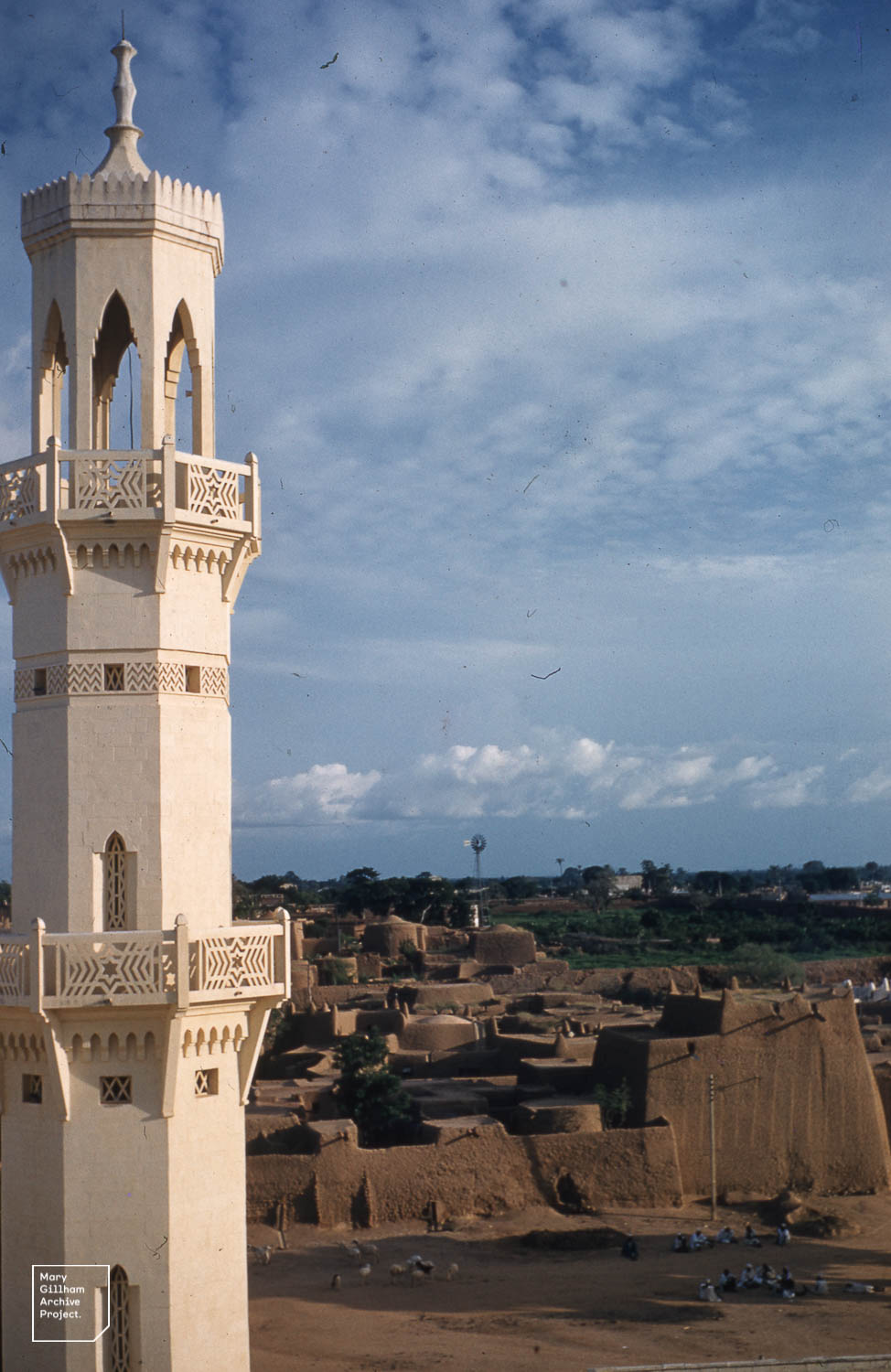
View from the minarets of the mosque in 1960.

The Great Mosque of Kano with a wall around it with a gate, two tall minarets and a large dome - Kano, North Nigeria - 13–15 January 1962

The great mosque of Kano is the oldest mosque in Nigeria and was built for Muhammad Rumfa in the 15th-century. It was made of mud, and was of the soro, or tower, variety. Prior to Rumfa's reign and conversion to Islam, the location of the central mosque of Kano is not known, but was likely in one of two places. The first possibility is the Sharifai quarter, inhabited by the descendants of the 15th-century Berber scholar al-Maghili. The second possibility is the Yan Doya quarter, inhabited by Wangara muslims from the Mali empire.

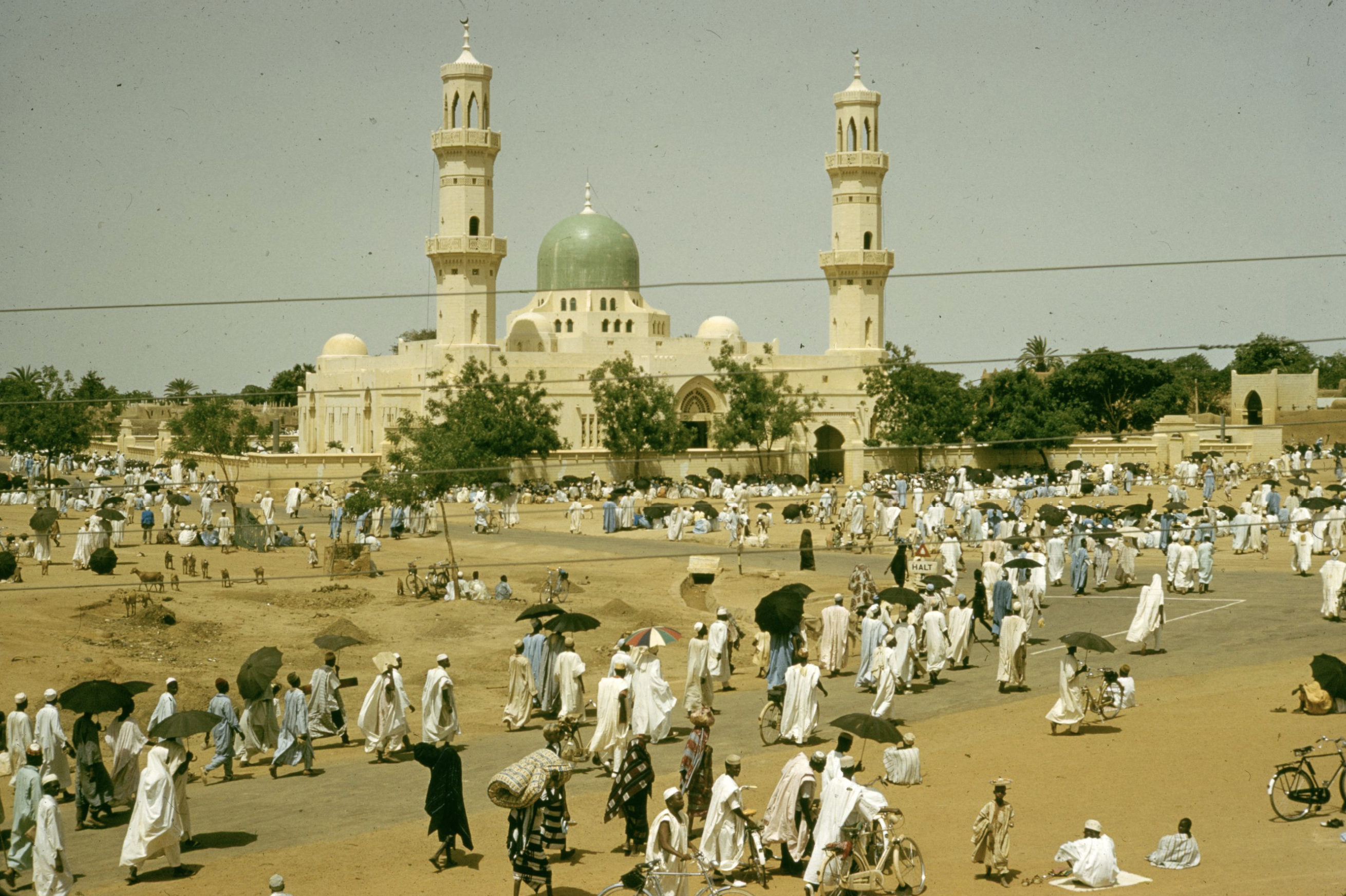
Muslims at prayer at Central Mosque of Kano, 1961

It was moved to a new site by Muhammad Zaki in 1582, and rebuilt in the mid 19th century by Abdullahi Dan Dabo. After the Sokoto jihad, Emir Suleiman, who was regarded as the Imam of Kano, led Friday prayers himself in the mosque. Subsequent emirs have delegated the authority to an appointed Imam.

It was destroyed in the 1950s, and rebuilt with British sponsorship.

=== 1980 Kano riot ===
In December 1980, adherents of the preacher Maitatsine, known as Yan Tatsine, launched an assault on the mosque's attendees during Friday prayers in an attempt to seize control of the mosque. The conflict persisted for eleven days, initially engaging with the police and later escalating to involve the army. The intense confrontation concluded only after Maitatsine and his followers were killed defending their headquarters. The officially reported death toll surpassed 4,000, although other sources indicate a higher toll.

== See also ==
- Islam in Nigeria
- List of mosques in Nigeria
