= Kofar Mata Dye Pits =

Kofar Mata Dye Pits are a group of traditional indigo dyeing pits located in the ancient city of Kano, Kano State, Nigeria. The site is regarded as one of the oldest continuously operating dyeing centers in West Africa and is closely associated with the cultural and economic history of the Hausa people.

The dye pits are situated near the historic Kofar Mata gate of the Kano city walls and have been in use for several centuries, producing hand-dyed textiles using natural indigo.

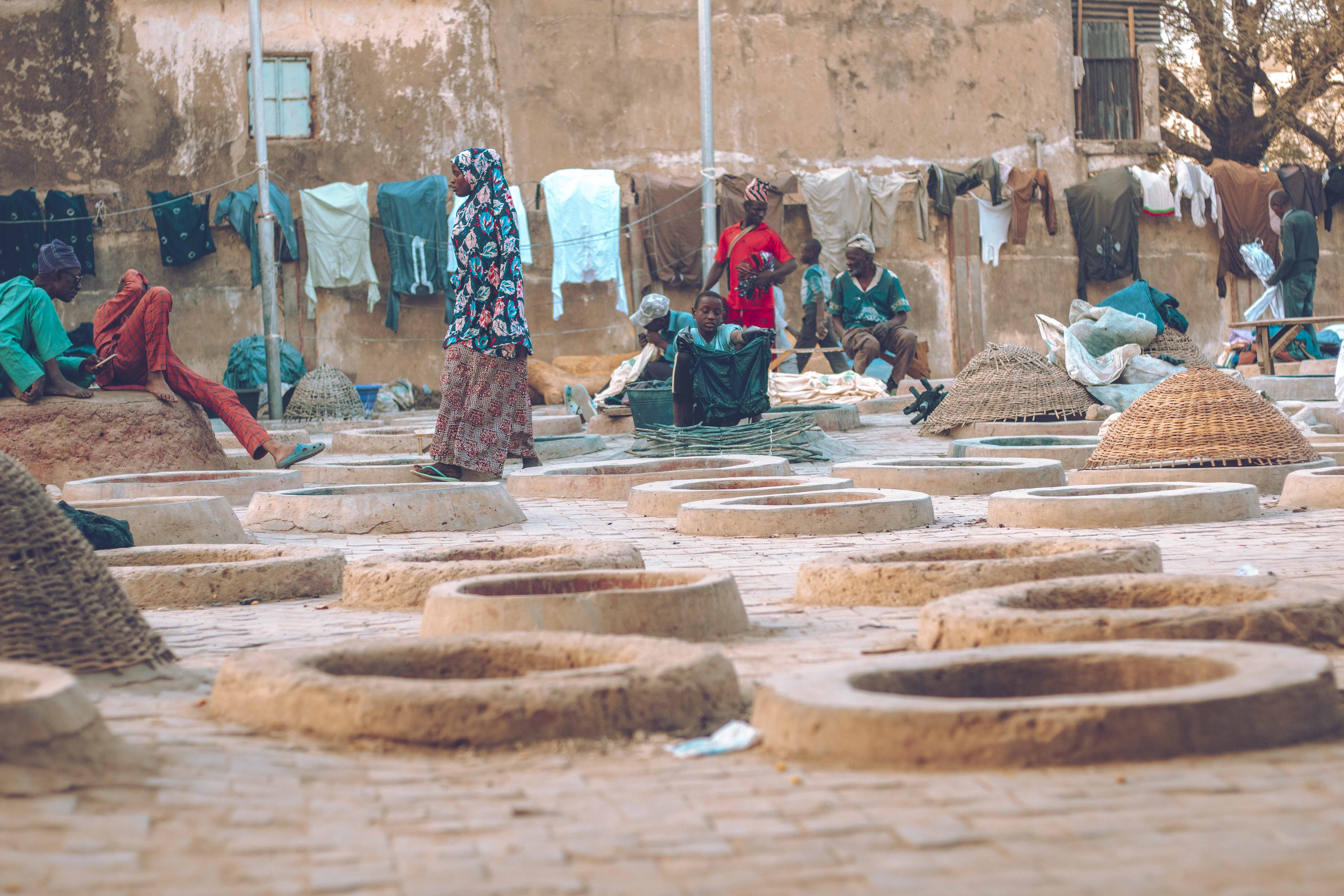
Dye pits in the Sahara

== History ==
The origins of the Kofar Mata Dye Pits are commonly traced back more than 500 years, to the period when Kano was a major commercial center within the Trans-Saharan trade networks. Indigo dyeing developed alongside the growth of textile production in the city, serving both local consumption and long-distance trade.

During the pre-colonial era, dyed cloth from Kano was widely traded across present-day northern Nigeria and beyond, contributing to the city's reputation as a center of craftsmanship and commerce. The dye pits continued to operate during the colonial period and remain active into the 21st century.

== Traditional dying process ==
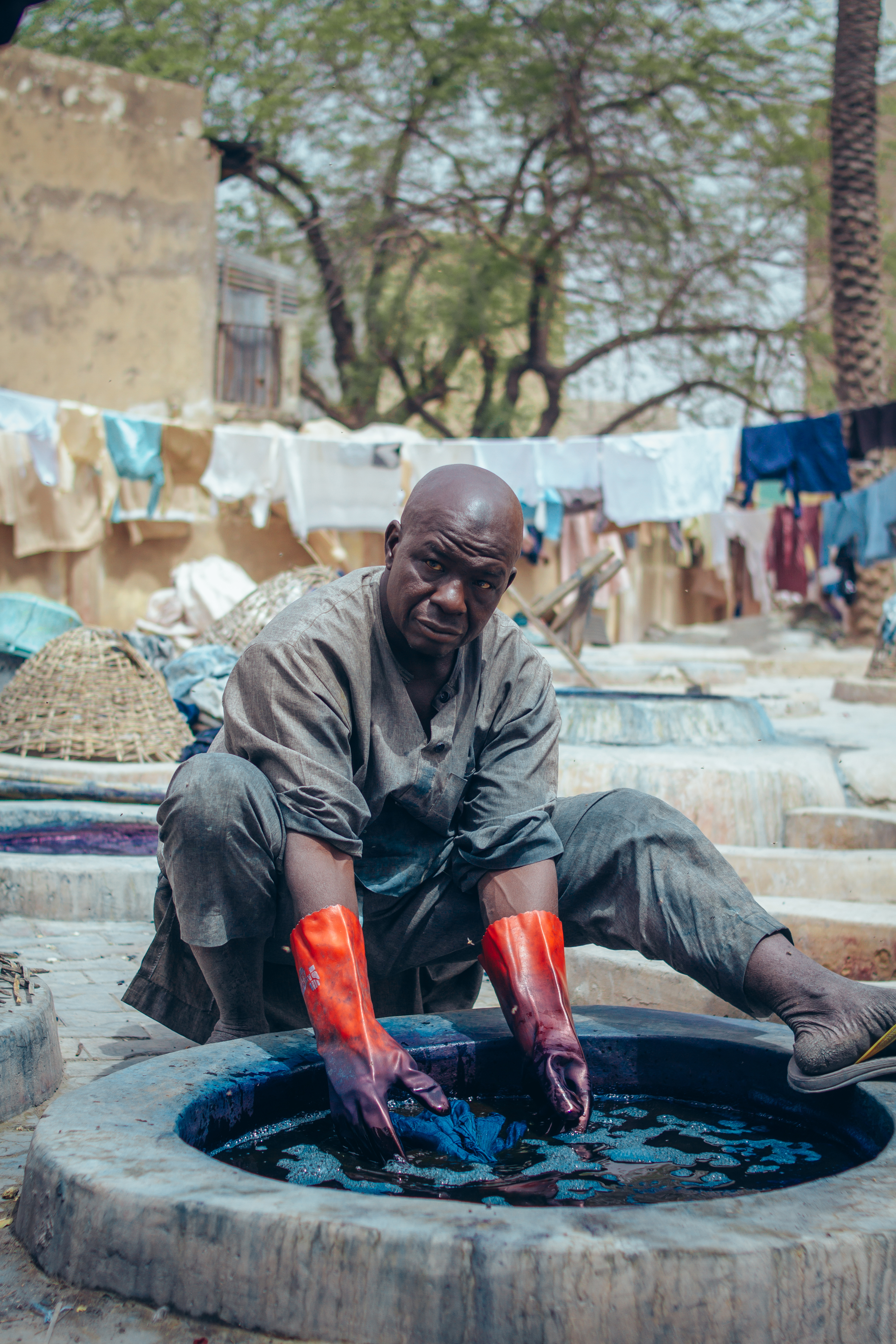
This is the oldest of its kind in west Africa, a dye pit were clothes are being dyed into indigo or blue with use of chemicals and it is all done by hand.

The dyeing process at Kofar Mata relies on natural indigo extracted from local plants. The pits are deep, circular vats dug into the ground, each containing a fermented indigo solution. Cloth is repeatedly dipped into the vats and exposed to air, allowing oxidation to produce the characteristic deep blue color.

The knowledge of dye preparation and textile treatment is traditionally passed down through families, and the work is primarily carried out by male dyers using techniques that have changed little over generations.

== Cultural significance ==
Kofar Mata Dye Pits are widely regarded as a symbol of Kano's cultural heritage. The site represents indigenous knowledge systems, traditional industry, and continuity of craftsmanship in Hausa society.

The dye pits are also associated with traditional clothing styles, including hand-dyed robes and fabrics worn during cultural and religious ceremonies. As such, the site holds both historical and social importance for local communities.

== Tourism and preservation ==
The dye pits are a recognized cultural landmark in Kano and attract visitors, researchers, and tourists interested in traditional African crafts. Concerns have been raised about environmental pressures, urban development, and declining interest among younger generations, prompting calls for preservation and heritage protection.

Various cultural advocates and organizations have highlighted the importance of safeguarding the site as an example of living heritage.
