= Muhammad Rumfa =

- Sarkin Kano
- Reign: 1463 - 1499
- Predecessor: Yakubu
- Successor: Abdullahi dan Rumfa
- Born: Muhammad
- House: Bagauda (Rumfawa)
- Father: Yakubu
- Mother: Fasima Berana
- Religion: Islam

Muhammad dan Yakubu, known as Muhammad Rumfa was the sultan of Kano from 1463 until 1499. His reign was characterized by wealth and opulence and signaled the rise of the Kano's commercial dominance in the region.Under the guidance of famed Berber Scholar, Muhammad Al-Maghili, he was also responsible for much of the Islamization of Kano.

In total, the Kano Chronicle attributed twelve innovations to him, including; extending the city walls, building a large palace, the Gidan Rumfa, promoting slaves to governmental positions and establishing the Kurmi Market. The Great Mosque of Kano was also built during his reign. Rumfa’s reforms also proved to be the catalyst that would propel Kano to its political peak, resulting in the first Kanoan Empire under his grandson, Muhammad Kisoki..

He was the first Sarki (Hausa title for chief) who used "Dawakin Zaggi" in the war with Katsina Emirate. He was also the first sarki who practised "Kame". He appointed Durman to go round the dwellings of the Indabawa and take every first-born virgin for him. He was the first sarki to have a thousand wives. His era of oligarchs came to be eponymously known as the "Rumfawa", and would last until their replacement by the "Kutumbawa" in 1623. Muhammad Rumfa is considered by historians to be Kano's greatest ruler due to the reforms executed during his reign.

== Lineage and accession ==
The lineage of Muhammad Rumfa and his two predecessors is the subject of much debate. The Kano Chronicle lists Rumfa as the son of Yakubu, the nineteenth ruler of Kano and Fasima Berana (a Kanuri name). However, some sources list Rumfa, Yakubu, and Abdullahi Burja as paternal half brothers and others list Yakubu as the first of the Rumfawa. These sources state Rumfa's mother to be Fatima, a woman from Rano.

Furthermore, some historians theorize that he came from Daura by way of Gaya or from Kula in Northern Gaya. It is believed that while the Rumfawa were likely descendants of Bagauda, their faction were primarily based in or ceased power with the aid of Gaya and possibly the backing of Bornu. The events that transpired in the reign of his predecessor signified the full assimilation of Gaya into Kano and saw the men of Gaya come into prominence in the state. The Kano chronicle states that after Yakubu's accession, the King of Gaya, Agalfati, who was also the son of the King of Machina, came to Kano and his kin assumed stewardship of various important towns in Kano, mainly, the historic Hadejia, Gayam, and Dal. The new ruler of Hadejia was also bestowed the stewardship of Garin Gabas. Dal was located strategically between Burum Burum, Rano and the pagans of Southern Kano. This could be seen as a reward for Gaya's role in the Rumfawa's accession or part of the terms for their submission to Kano. Gaya was one of the last major provinces to be fully incorporated into Kano.

== Sultan of Kano ==
“He was a good man, just and learned. He can have no equal in might, from the time of the founding of Kano, until it shall end...surely there was no Sarki more powerful than Rumfa”

Rumfa succeeded his father in 1463. His reign was characterized by unprecedented economic growth, numerous administrative reforms and great infrastructural development. Rumfa inherited a booming economy which saw a wave of migration of scholars and traders, mostly of Arab, Kanuri, Berber and Fula descent. The most notable of these migrants was popular Berber scholar Muhammad Al-Maghili who claimed to be a Mujaddid. He had a brief stop in Katsina before coming to Kano. It is said Al-Maghili was implored by the Islamic Prophet Muhammad in a dream to go west and spread Islam. He then took the soil of Medina as a sample and set out comparing the soil sample to each place he visited until he came to Kano where he saw a resemblance between the soils. There he concluded that he had found his destination. He came with many Islamic books and sought to teach the people about the Islamic faith. When he felt that he had accomplished his goal and learned men were ubiquitous, he left Kano for Masr (Egypt), leaving Sidi Fari to carry on his work.

Under the tutelage of Al-Maghili, Rumfa made numerous Islamic reforms and encouraged the pure practice of Islam in the Sultanate, humbling the pagans (Abagayawa in particular) in the process and banning their practices. He built a minaret on the site of the pagan sacred tree after cutting it down. Rumfa also built numerous mosques and during his reign Eid al-Fitr was first celebrated in Kano. Rumfa granted slaves positions in his government, some of whom he entrusted with the treasury. He is also said to have formed the "Taran Kano" (Council of Nine) who were meant to be advisers and Kingmakers. Kulle (Purdah) was first practiced by him. The Sultan established the Kurmi Market to improve trade and also installed an Ombudsman for better governance.

Al-Maghili wrote the book "On the Obligation of Princes" as a guide for the Kano Sultan and for a time was an influential figure in his court. Some of Maghili's descendants and that of his entourage (Sharifai) are still in Kano.

=== Wealth ===
Luxurious clothing and expensive ostrich feather shoes were common among government officials. The kakaki was also first used during his reign. His wealth is owed to Kano's commercial prosperity during this period. Kano arguably achieved the height of its reputation as a trading center in the Middle Ages during his reign. Leo Africanus's description of Kano is believed to be that of Rumfas era. He described the locals as "wealthy merchants and skilled craftsmen" and commended the cavalry of the Sultan's army. He also noted the abundance of rice, corn, cotton and citrus fruits.

=== Feuds ===
Though Kano experienced growth and opulence under Rumfa's reign, the sultanate was engaged in a war with Katsina and was reportedly the victim of an invasion by the powerful Songhai Empire though the latter is historically dubious.

=== War with the Katsina Emirate ===
Rumfa's war with Katsina marked the first time a war ensued between the two states. It lasted for eleven years with no decisive victor. During this war, the Sultan was said to be the first ruler to utilize the "Dawakan Zagi", a form of psychological warfare.

=== Alleged Songhai Empire invasion ===
The army of Askiya the Great, in alliance with his hausa Aide de camp Muhammad Kanta Kotal of Kebbi, was said to have subdued most Hausa States. The Songhai marched into Kano on the invitation of Kano's sister states Zazzau and Katsina who sought for Askiya's intervention in dealing with Kano but ended up being the first casualties of his conquest. After a long siege, Kano fell to Songhai forces. Askiya had some of his men, reside in kano to collect the imposed tax and exhorted Rumfa to marry his daughter believed to be Madaki Auwa to solidify his position.

==== Historical accuracy of the Songhai invasion ====
The conquest of the Songhai in Hausa land was mainly drawn from the accounts of Leo Africanus. But his venture into Hausaland is the subject of debate. His account is believed to be based on hear-say in Gao or Timbuktu about events that may have transpired around Rumfa's era and sort to glorify the exploits of the Askiya. Other historians have argued that the Songhai authority over Hausaland was "at best ephemeral and perhaps non-existent". Humphrey J Fisher argued that while the invasion may have happened it had no lasting impact and the effects were over-inflated while being open to the possibility that the invasion never happened at all. Furthermore, the Songhai and Hausa Chronicles make no mention of this event. The Kano Chronicle while fair enough to mention Kano's misfortunes at various times made no mention of the Songhai Conquest. Others like Lady Lugard, have argued that the omission of the Songhai Invasion from the Hausa Chronicles is due to the indifference of the Hausa States when it came to non Hausa States. It is widely accepted that if the Songhai Conquest in Hausaland happened, it was merely a paltry event. Rumfa's supposed marriage to Askiyas daughter may have been diplomatic. Some attribute the conquest entirely to Kanta Kotal.

== Personal life ==
Muhammad Rumfa was said to have taken every first born virgin for himself and had a thousand concubines. His most notable spouse is the influential Madaki Auwa, with whom he sired his successor, Abdullahi dan Rumfa and Abubakar Kado, the twenty fifth ruler of Kano with.

=== Name ===
Oral traditions dictate that his epithet "Rumfa" came because during his time, wild dogs were rampant and feasted on the food of Kano's inhabitants. When they came to the Sultan for a solution, his grandson Muhammad, who was playing in his court, suggested they build rumfa (sheds) where they could keep the food out of the dogs' reach. At first, the Sultan was dismissive of the child's advice but his advisers saw the wisdom of the child's statement and compelled the Sultan to consider it. The child's advice worked and the people prayed that he would one day become Sultan. Muhammad would later become the twenty second ruler of Kano and the first Emperor of the Kanoan Empire.

== Legacy ==
Rumfa is widely considered to be Kano's greatest king. Some of the structures he built and the administrative reforms during his reign are still being used in Kano today. The Kings palace, Gidan Rumfa, is named after him. So is the prestigious Rumfa college, Kano.

== Biography in the Kano Chronicle ==
Below is a full biography of Muhammad Rumfa (or Muhammad Rimfa) from Palmer's 1908 English translation of the Kano Chronicle.

The 20th Sarki was Mohamma, son of Yakubu, commonly called Rimfa. His mother’s name was Fasima Berana.

He was a good man, just and learned. He can have no equal in might, from the time of the founding of Kano, until it shall end.

In his time the Sherifs came to Kano. They were Abdu Rahaman and his people. There is a story that the Prophet appeared to Abdu Rahaman in a dream and said to him, “Get up and go west and establish Islam.” Abdu Rahaman got up and took a handful of the soil of Medina, and put it in a cloth, and brought it to Hausaland.

Whenever he came to a town, he took a handful of the soil of the country and put it beside that of Medina. If they did not correspond he passed that town. So he journeyed until he came to Kano. And when he compared the soil of Kano with Medina soil they resembled one another and became as one soil. So he said, “This is the country that I saw in my dream.”

And he took up his abode at Panisau. Then he sent in to the Sarkin Kano. The Sarkin Kano Rimfa went out together with his men, and escorted Abdu Rahaman back to the city together with his men, of whom the chief were Hanatari, Gemindodo, Gadangami, Fokai and others, 10 in all.

Abdu Rahaman lived in Kano and established Islam. He brought with him many books. He ordered Rimfa to build a mosque for Friday, and to cut down the sacred tree and build a minaret on the site. And when he had established the Faith of Islam, and learned men had grown numerous in Kano, and all the country round had accepted the Faith, Abdu Karini returned to Massar, leaving Sidi Fari as his deputy to carry on his work.

Rimfa was the author of 12 innovations in Kano.

1. He built the Dakin Rimfa.
2. The next year he extended the walls towards the Kofan Mata from the Kofan Dagachi and continued the work to Kofan Gertawasa and Kofan Kawayi, and from the Kofan Näissa to the Kofan Kansakali.
3. The next year he entered his house. He established the Kurmi Market.
4. He was the first Sarki who used “Dawakin Zaggi” in the war with Katsina.
5. He was the first Sarki who practised “Kama.”
6. He appointed Durman to go round the dwellings of the Indabawa and take every first-born virgin for him.
7. He was the first Sarki to have a thousand wives.
8. He began the custom of “Kulle.”
9. He began the “Tara-ta-Kano.”
10. He was the first to have “Kakaki” and “Figinni,” and ostrich-feather sandals.
11. It was in his reign that the Sallam Idi was first celebrated in Kano at Shadakoko.
12. He began the custom of giving to eunuchs the offices of state, among them, Dan Kusuba, Dan Jigawa, Dan Tarbana, Sarkin Gabbas, Sarkin Tudu, Sarkin Eua, Maaji, Sarkin Bai, Sarkin Kofa. There were four eunuchs left without a title. He said to them, “I make you chiefs of the Treasury.” The name of one was Turaki, another was Aljira; the names of the other two were Al-Soro and Kashe Kusa.

The Galadima Dabuli built a house at Goda, and the Madawaki Badosa built a house at Hori. Chiroma Bugaya built a house at Dabazaro.

Surely there was no Sarki more powerful than Rimfa! He was sung as: “The Arab Sarki, of wide sway.”

In his time occurred the first war with Katsina. It lasted 11 years, without either side winning.

He ruled 37 years.

— Kano Chronicle

Preceded by Yakubu	Sarkin Kano; 1463-1499	Succeeded by Abdullahi
