= Lawan Musa Abdullahi =

Nigerian lawyer and politician

Barr. Lawan Musa Abdullahi

Attorney-General and Commissioner of Justice
- Incumbent
- Assumed office 15 July 2020
- Preceded by: Ibrahim Mukhtar

Commissioner of Housing Transportation
- In office 2019–2020

Chairman Nigerian Bar Association, Kano State
- In office 2018–2019

Personal details
- Born: 25 March 1970 (age 56) Fagge, Kano State, Nigeria
- Party: All Progressives Congress
- Education: Bayero University Kano
- Profession: Lawyer and politician

Lawan Musa Abdullahi, also known as M. A. Lawan, (born 25 March 1970) is a Nigerian lawyer and politician. He is the Attorney-General and commissioner for justice in Kano State. He is a former chairman of Nigerian Bar Association, Kano State branch.

== Early life and background ==
Abdullahi was born in Fagge LGA, Kano State, the son of Alhaji Musa Abdullahi. He started his primary school education at Festival Primary School and completed it at Magwan Primary School when his family moved from Fagge to Tarauni LGA. He obtained his senior secondary school certificate at St. Thomas Secondary School before preceding to Bayero University Kano, where he studied law and he was called to the Nigerian Bar in 2001.

== Legal career ==
Abdullahi began his legal practice with S. H. Garun Gabas & Co in 2001. In 2006, he left the firm as head of the chamber to team up with Muhammad Umar & Co.. In 2010, he moved to establish his firm, M. A. Lawn & Co. In 2018, he was elected as the chairman of the Nigerian Bar Association, Kano State branch.

== Political career ==
In 2019, he was appointed as commissioner for housing and transport by the governor of Kano State Abdullahi Umar Ganduje. In 2020, he was deployed to Ministry of Justice to serve as the state's Attorney-General and commissioner for justice.
