= Kurmi Market =

Coordinates: 12°00′N 8°31′E

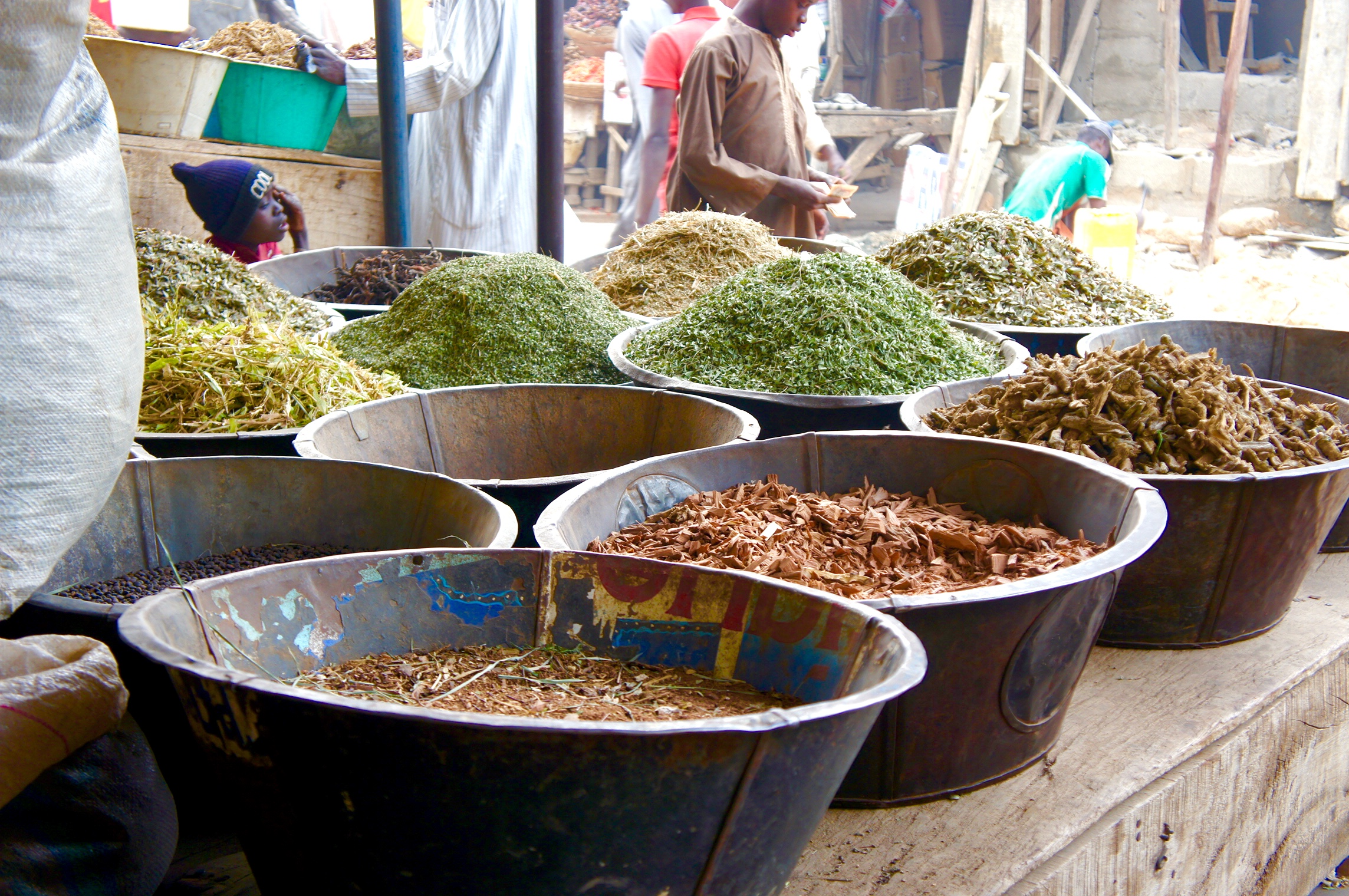
Sandalwood and incense materials at Kurmi Market.

The Kurmi Market is a large market in the city of Kano, Kano State, Nigeria. It was founded by Muhammad Rumfa, a King of Kano, in the 15th century. As of 2003, Sale Ayagi was chairman of the market's unions.

Kurmi Market has lent its name to a football team.

== History ==
Kurmi market was established in the fifteenth century as a trading and warehousing center for the growing commercial activities in the city, a result of expanding regional and Trans-Saharan trade. It was built within the Jakara district of the city. At the time of its development, Kano had become a regional center of trade in agricultural products with a functional industry in weaving, cloth dyeing, leather making and potter, this contributed to the attraction of the city to itinerant traders from Western Sudan, Tripoli and Ghadames who came to buy goods. Prior to the pre-colonial period, the market structure was organized in a quadrangle shape with bamboo stalls forming rows like an irregular street; within the market, particular quarters served distinct products and the cattle trade was located in the westernmost parts and outskirts of the market. The market was administered by individuals who supervised specific quarters or produce sections.The market had served as a major slave market where slaves were bought and sold during slave trade era.

=== Colonial and post-colonial period ===
In 1904, the old market was demolished and a new one was built so as to improve revenue generation for the Kano Native Authority. The new market opened in 1909 and was composed of 755 stalls made of clay, and had a mosque and a courthouse. Over the years incremental improvements took place, the streets were widened and some livestock sellers were asked to relocate. The surrounding of the market, in particular the Jakara area also witnessed expanded development. However, the direction of trade changed away from the city's northern neighbors and Trans-Saharan trade to trade with the Southern neighbors and Europeans.

In 1969, the administration of the market fell into the hands of the Kano Local Government. Since then, the local government has encouraged specialized markets within the city such as Yan Kaba for vegetables and Kantin Kwari Market for textiles, some traders also moved to new emerging growth centers in the city such as Fagge and the Sabon Gari Market. Currently, the market has lost some of its lore as a centre of regional trade and caters mostly to local consumer interests.

== Sources ==
- Naniya, Tijjani (2001). "A History of Kurmi Market, Kano 1463-1999". Kano: FAIS Journal of Humanities, Vol 1, No 3.
