= Kaltume Bulama Gana =

Nigerian artist and cultural administrator

- Born: December 25, 1964 (age 61); Kano State, Nigeria
- Education: Ahmadu Bello University (BA, MFA)
- Occupations: Visual artist; cultural administrator
- Years active: 1985–present
- Known for: First female Artistic Director and CEO of the National Troupe of Nigeria; founder of Herwa Heart of Art Initiative
- Father: Alhaji Bulama Gana (Late)
- Relatives: Ambassador Mohammed Lawan Gana (brother)
- Awards: Outstanding Leadership Award in Arts, Culture & Women Empowerment (Yunus Emre Enstitüsü, 2025)

Kaltume Bulama Gana is a Nigerian visual artist, cultural administrator, and advocate for arts‑led development. She is the first female Artistic Director and CEO of the National Troupe of Nigeria (NTN), appointed in January 2024. She is also the founder of the Herwa Heart of Art Initiative, focusing on arts‑based support for women and children affected by conflict. Her work spans painting, murals, mosaics, public monuments, arts therapy, and cultural innovation.

== Early life and education ==
Born in Kano State, Gana hails from Yobe State and is the daughter of Alhaji Bulama Gana (Late) and the younger sister of Nigerian Ambassador Mohammed Lawan Gana. She earned a Bachelor of Arts in Fine Arts (Painting) in 1985 and a Master of Fine Arts in 1990 from Ahmadu Bello University, Zaria. She also studied Islamic Arts at Mimar Sinan University in Istanbul.

== Career ==
=== Early roles ===
Gana began her career at Kano State Television (CTV67) from 1985–1986, for her youth service, then joined the Kano State History & Culture Bureau in 1987 as Assistant Director in the Creative Arts Department. She is a Fellow of the Society of Nigerian Artists.

=== Artistic practice ===
Gana is an artist with over 47 global exhibitionas and awards. She has participated in multiple solo exhibitions, including at the British Council (Kano, April 1987), Alliance Française (Kano, December 1987), and International Women’s Day (Kano, March 1988), as well as numerous group shows at ABU, Zaria and the National Theatre in Lagos. Her works include the painting Queen Amina (commissioned for Zumunta Association, Washington DC).

=== Public art & cultural stewardship ===
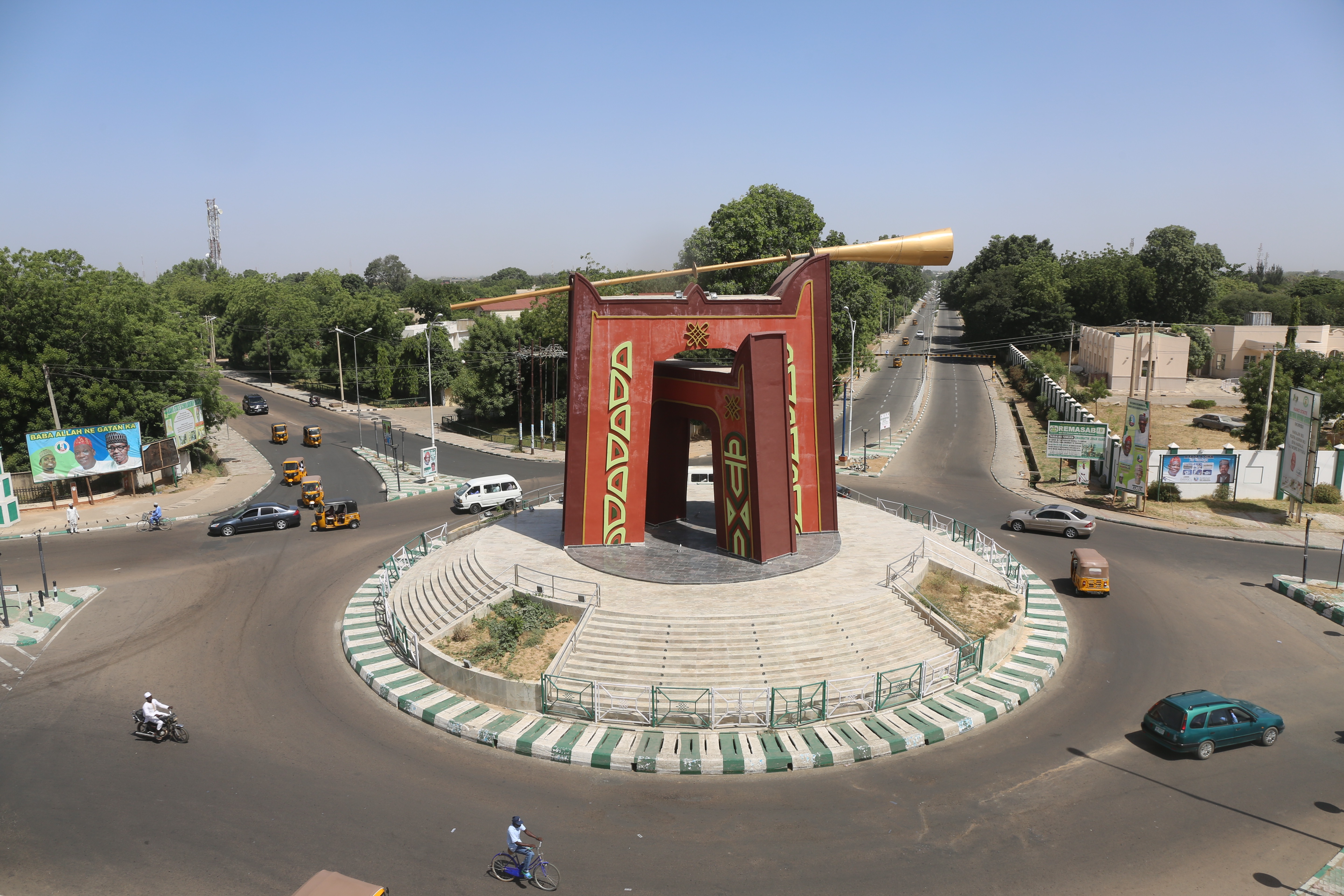
New Kano Golden Jubilee Round About designed by Kaltume Bulama Gana

She designed the notable Kano Golden Jubilee Monument—built in 2017 to mark Kano State’s 50th anniversary—incorporating Hausa cultural motifs. She publicly criticized its demolition, calling it a loss to the cultural heritage of Kano. Gana also served as Curator at the National Art Gallery in Kano in 2011. In 2023, she became the zonal coordinator North-West, National Gallery of Arts.

=== National Troupe of Nigeria (NTN) ===
In January 2024 she was appointed Artistic Director/CEO of the National Troupe of Nigeria, becoming the first female to hold the position. Under her leadership, the troupe launched the “Reimagining the National Troupe of Nigeria through Innovation” initiative in December 2024 at the National Theatre, Lagos, blending traditional dance with virtual reality and digital games. The troupe represented Nigeria at the 2025 World Expo in Osaka, performing traditional folklore and dance forms to global acclaim.

== Advocacy and social impact ==
Gana founded the Herwa Heart of Art Initiative, which provides arts‑based vocational training to children and young women traumatized by Boko Haram conflict. Through cultural diplomacy and creative empowerment, the initiative promotes mental health and economic independence.

== Awards and recognition ==
On International Women’s Day, March 2025, she received the Outstanding Leadership Award in Arts, Culture & Women Empowerment from the Yunus Emre Enstitüsü in recognition of her contributions to cultural preservation, gender inclusion, and transformative leadership in Nigeria’s creative sector.
