= Yusufu =

Yusufu can be a masculine given name, a middle name, or a surname. Notable people with the name include:

- Yusufu Bala Usman, Nigerian historian and politician
- Tukur Yusufu Buratai, Nigerian lieutenant general
- Amadu Yusufu (fl. 1984), Malawian cyclist
- Muhammadu Dikko Yusufu, Nigerian policeman and politician

== See also ==
- Yusuf, Arabic masculine given name
- Joseph, English, French, and German masculine given name (equivalent to "Yusuf")
