= Auwalu Abdullahi Rano =

Nigerian businessman and philanthropist

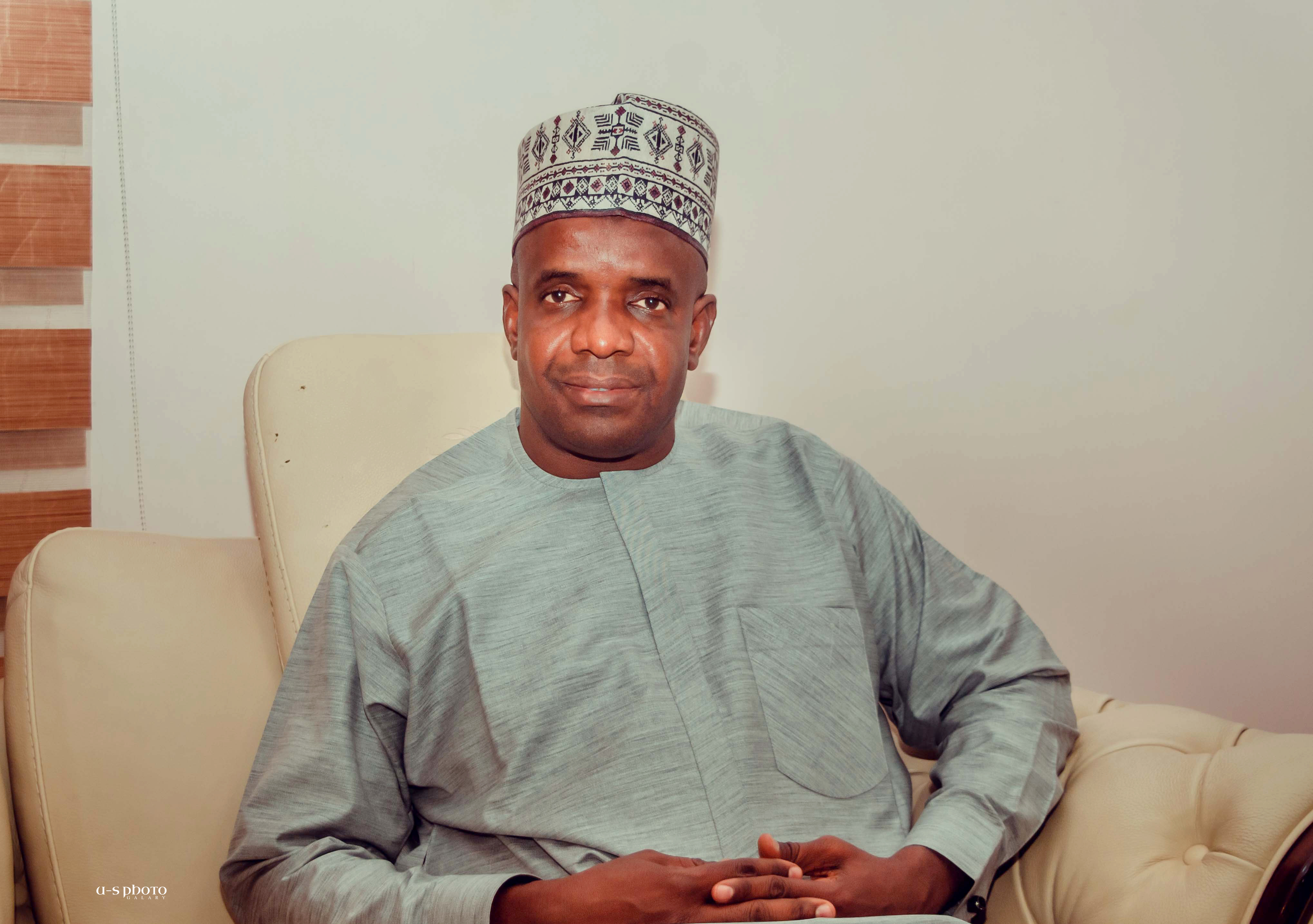
- Born: February 7, 1974 (age 52); Kano State, Nigeria
- Occupations: Businessman, philanthropist
- Known for: AA Rano Industries, Rano Air Limited
- Spouse: Hajia Asma'u Auwalu Abdullahi Rano

Auwalu Abdullahi Rano OON (born 7 February 1974), also known as AA Rano, is a Nigerian businessman who founded AA Rano Nigeria Limited, a company involved in various industries including oil and gas, airlines, and agriculture.

Rano is from the Rano Local Government Area of Kano South, in the northern part of Nigeria.

== Early life ==
Rano was born in Lausu town in the Rano Local Government Area of Kano State, Nigeria. He is a member of Fulani ethnic group. His business career began with the sale of ice blocks, groundnut oil, and other local items.

== Philanthropy ==
Rano established the AA Rano Foundation, a non-governmental and non-profit organisation. The foundation carries out community development projects in areas such as health, education, water provision, and empowerment initiatives for youth and women.

== Recognition ==
- The Nigerian government awarded him the national honour of Officer of the Order of the Niger (OON).
- In 2021, he was named The Sun Industrialist of the Year.
