= Samuel Oboh =

Canadian architect

Samuel Óghalé Oboh
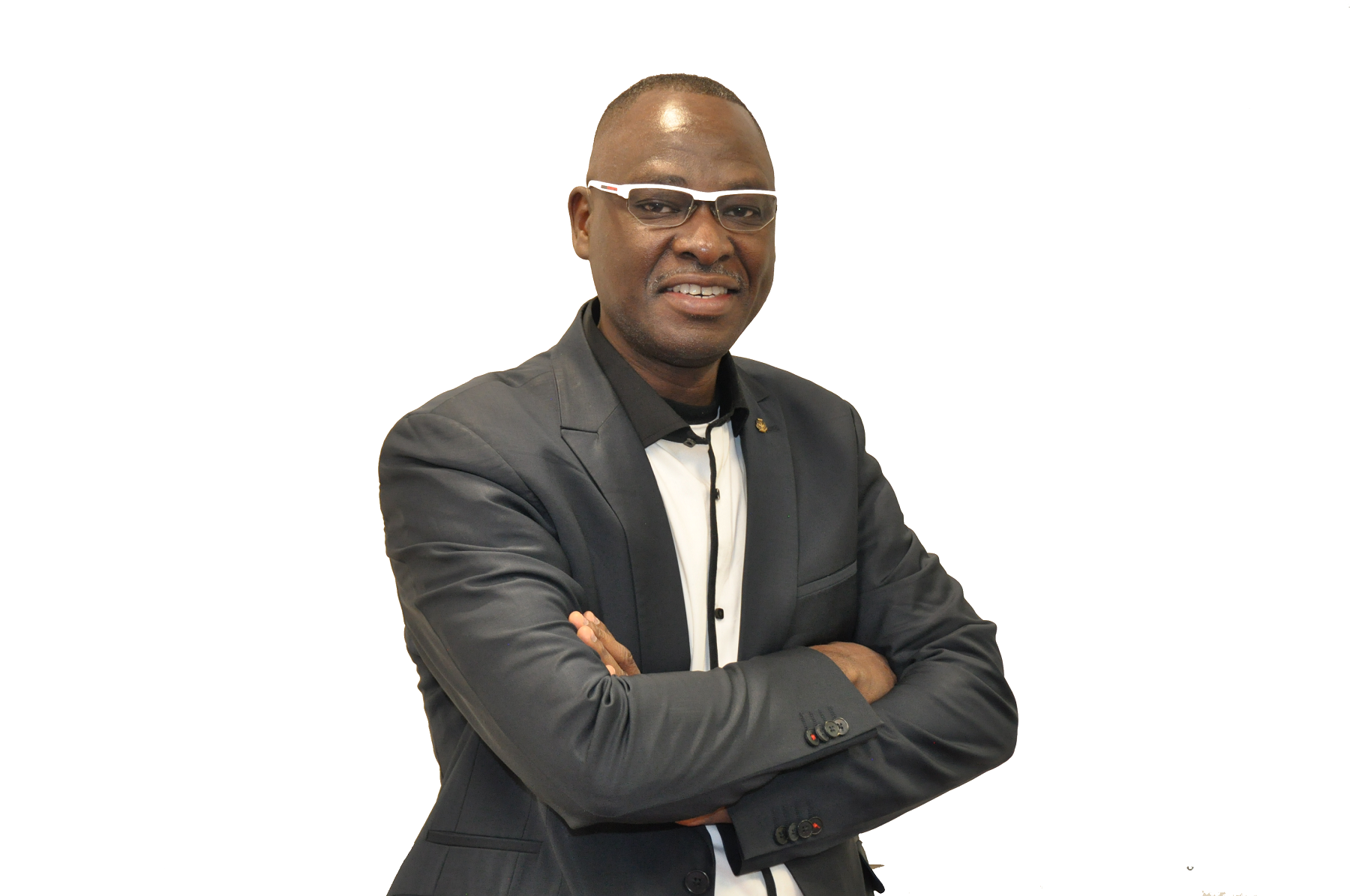
- 2015 President of the Royal Architectural Institute of Canada, Architect, 2021-2023 Vice President of UIA and Consul for the Republic of Botswana in Canada
- Born: March 27, 1971 (age 55); Lagos, Nigeria
- Education: University of Alberta Ahmadu Bello University Ambrose Alli University
- Occupation: Architect
- Children: Noora, Rhiannon, and Oreva
- Parent: Eunice + Johnson Oboh
- Awards: 2024 recipient of the King Charles III Coronation Medal (for contributions to the field of Architecture); 2024 BOND Awards (Trailblazer in Architecture), Toronto, Canada; 2023 recipient of the Tom Sutherland Architecture Award in Canada; 2023 Honorary Fellow, Nigerian Institute of Architects (Hon. FNIA); 2022 honorary award recipient, Colegio de Arquitectos de Bolivia; Recipient of the 2016 Excellence Awards for Leadership; IBI Group Team member, LEED Gold Award for South East Division Police Station Project in Edmonton; 2018 Distinguished Fellow of the American Institute of Architects (FAIA); Named: One of Canada’s Leadership and Innovation Visionaries -commemorating Canada’s 150th anniversary 2015 - American Institute of Architects Presidential Medal Recipient 2015 - Honoree, Royal Australian Institute of Architects; 2015 - Named: One of Alberta’s 50 Most Influential People in Alberta by Alberta Venture Magazine
- Practice: Ensight+ Architecture
- Buildings: Alberta Legislature Centre Redevelopment Project - site of Queen Elizabeth II Building in Edmonton; Red Deer Civic Yards; Villa Caritas; International Law Enforcement Academy; Consulate of Botswana in Edmonton, Canada.
- Projects: Diplomacy by Design: A Design Excellence Framework for Canadian Embassies and Missions Abroad; Repeatable Laboratory Design Framework for LabsCanada; International Law Enforcement Academy Gaborone; Red Deer Civic Yards; Botswana Police College; Maun District Hospital; Alberta at the Smithsonian Folklife Festival, Washington DC; Alberta Legislature Centre Redevelopment Master Plan Royal Alberta Museum of History Development on the Legislature Grounds, Edmonton.

Samuel Óghalé Oboh (born March 27, 1971) is a Canadian architect. He was the former Vice President - Architecture at AECOM Canada Architects Ltd and the 2015 President of the Royal Architectural Institute of Canada (RAIC). Sam Oboh is the first Canadian of African descent to be elected as president of this Canadian Royal Institute. In 2021, at the Rio General Assembly, Oboh was elected as the Vice President for Region 3 of the Paris-based International Union of Architects (UIA) Oboh, a 2024 recipient of the King Charles III Coronation Medal, was elevated to the College of Fellows of the American Institute of Architects in June 22, 2018. With his investiture, Oboh qualified to use the FAIA designation.

Oboh is the 2023 recipient of the Tom Sutherland Award in Architecture in Canada. He is also the recipient of the NCBN Professional Excellence of the Year Award in 2018, and the 2016 Excellence Magazine Award for Leadership. He was named as one of the 150 Extraordinary Canadians - Visionaries who Inspire the Next Generation Canadians (in commemoration of the sesquicentennial of Canadian Confederation); and also named one of the Top 50 Most Influential People in Alberta by Alberta Venture. Since late 2015, Oboh assumed a diplomatic role - serving as the highest ranking representative and Consul for the Republic of Botswana in Canada.

== Early life and education ==
Oboh was born in Lagos, Nigeria, in 1971, the third of six children. His father, Johnson Oboh, was a mechanical engineering technician for a Swiss company - UTC whose work made them live in various parts of the country - Lagos, Maiduguri, and Yola, among other places. Oboh graduated high school at the head of his 1987 class with the best result of his set at Government Day Secondary School, Army Barracks, Yola in North Eastern part of Nigeria. He was immediately accepted to the Bendel State University (now Ambrose Alli University) in the South at the age of 16 to study architecture. Oboh completed his bachelor's degree (B.Sc.) earning the highest grades of all architectural students in his 1992 graduating class with an Upper Second-Class Honours. He then proceeded to the Ahmadu Bello University, Zaria to complete his Master of Science degree in architecture in 1996.

As a graduate student at the Ahmadu Bello University, Sam Oboh attended the Africa 2000 Conference on Architecture in 1995 at the University of Cape Town, convened by the Erstwhile Director of the School of Architecture, Planning & Geomatics, Professor Ivor Prinsloo. The Cape Town stint represents a springboard for Oboh's architectural career with the chance meeting between Oboh and Wouter Gildenhuys - a fellow architect and the then Head of Department of Architecture at ML Sultan Technikon (now Durban University of Technology) in Durban, Kwazulu Natal - leading to Oboh's first job in South Africa. Oboh will later complete a second master's degree - a Master of Arts in Communication & Technology (with focus on Architectural Communication) in 2010 from the University of Alberta - where he was a recipient of the Herbert Marshall McLuhan Graduate Student Award in the Faculty of Extension.

== Career ==
Following his graduation from the Ahmadu Bello University in Zaria where he obtained his Master of Science degree in architecture in 1996 and the subsequent completion of his national youth service program in Katsina (near the border with Niger Republic), Oboh joined F&A Services - a design and construction firm - as a design architect, where he was part of the team responsible for the refurbishing of the Victoria Island-based Federal Palace Hotel, the site of the signing of Nigeria's Declaration of Independence. Shortly after in 1998, Oboh was appointed as an adjunct lecturer at the ML Sultan Technikon (now Durban University of Technology) teaching African Architecture. He will later join FMA Architects Southern Africa in the later part of 1998 as a design architect in their Gaborone Botswana office working on various institutional projects. Oboh become FMA's Resident Architect on the Botswana Police College project in Otse and the International Law Enforcement Academy - which he led and designed (following the enactment of the project from a bilateral agreement signed on July 24, 2000 between the Festus Mogae - led Government of Botswana and the Government of the United States of America - under the Bill Clinton administration. From Otse, Oboh headed northwards to become the Resident Architect on a $150-million District Hospital in Maun, ‘gateway’ to the Okavango Delta. The Maun District Hospital was designed to serve the entire North-West District of Botswana (Ngamiland) which includes the Okavango Delta - an area so lush and vibrant with wildlife that in June 2014, it became the 1000th site inscribed on the UNESCO World Heritage List and many consider the area to be a true paradise.

Oboh emigrated to Canada in December 2003 and immediately joined IBI Group Architects - where he obtained his LEED Accredited Professional designation and commenced working on projects such as the Edmonton Police Service - Southeast Division Station with Peter Bull and Peter Semchuk. Specifically, Oboh worked on the sustainability aspect of the Southeast Division Police Station project and led the LEED documentation / submission component that enabled the 4,300 m^{2} police station project achieve LEED Gold status. The South East Division Station became the first project in the City of Edmonton to achieve a LEED Gold status and also the first police station in North America to achieve the LEED Gold standard. Working closely with Peter Bull, Oboh was also IBI Group's Project Architect for the $118-million City of Red Deer Civic Yard (made up of a number of institutional, industrial-type buildings), constructed on a 28.1 hectares (69 acres) industrial site. Oboh and the IBI Group Team approached the Civic Yards Project with sustainability in mind - with three buildings on the site (the Administration Block, the Warehouse / stores / transit garages and the Vehicle car Wash have been designed to LEED standards.

Oboh joined Kasian Architecture as an associate in 2007 and he became a Principal of the firm in 2016. Through his work, Oboh believes design excellence can be achieved through the integration of architectural practice with research and academia. He exemplified his beliefs on projects such as the Alberta Legislature Centre Redevelopment Master Plan where he was the Lead Architect. Oboh led business development efforts - championing, securing and working on projects such as the redevelopment of the Alberta Legislature Grounds, Royal Alberta Museum of History, and the LEED Gold Edmonton Federal Building project (preserved to demonstrate Government of Alberta's commitment to sustainable buildings. From 2010 to 2016, Oboh joined the Department of Public Works and Government Services Canada (now Public Services and Procurement Canada) as prime architect and Regional Manager of the Architecture and Engineering Centre of Expertise in the Western Region - composed of Manitoba, Saskatchewan, Alberta, Nunavut and the Northwest Territories. He led the establishment of a new Architecture and Engineering Centre of Expertise, encompassing over 50 professionals, administrative staff and technical experts. Oboh created initiatives such as the Stewardship Excellence Protocol, aimed at fostering a culture of excellence on federal government projects and facilities.the Government of Canada.

Licensed as an architect in multiple jurisdictions including the state of Texas, United States, and the Canadian provinces of Alberta, Ontario, and British Columbia, Oboh is the International Region Representative to the American Institute of Architects' College of Fellows and a Fellow of the Royal Architectural Institute of Canada (RAIC). He was previously licensed in Botswana and South Africa and was a Chartered Architect member of the Royal Institute of British Architects (RIBA) from 2000 to 2007. On May 16, 2015, Oboh was awarded the Presidential Medal by the American Institute of Architects in Atlanta Georgia and a Presidential honour from the Australian Institute of Architects (RAIA) as an honorary Member. Oboh is a thought leader and regular speaker at several international conferences and forums around the world. - including Canada and the United States, Brazil, London - England, Paris - France, Brussels - Belgium, Berlin - Germany, Singapore, Seoul - South Korea, Lahore - Pakistan, Tokyo - Japan, Brisbane, Sydney and Melbourne Australia, N'djamena - Chad, Lagos - Nigeria, Kampala - Uganda, Gaborone - Botswana, Maseru - Lesotho, and various cities in South Africa. He has held an adjunct lecturer / visiting studio critic role with various universities including the University of Calgary, University of Toronto, Carleton University, and South Africa's University of Pretoria and Durban University of Technology. In 2006 he jointly led the establishment of Canada's first local chapter of the RAIC in Alberta, where he served as president in 2007/2008. During his tenure, Oboh led and championed a number of architectural advocacy initiatives including the curation of Alberta Architecture as part of the Government of Alberta presentation at the 2006 Smithsonian Folklife Festival in Washington, DC. In 2017, Oboh collaborated with Berlin-based architect Francis Kéré to lead the design of the proposed multimillion-dollar African Cultural Centre in Alberta – Canada.

== See also ==
- List of Nigerian architects
- List of Canadians
- List of architects
