= Majekodunmi =

Nigerian Given Name

- Gender: Male

Origin
- Origin: Nigeria
- Meaning: Do not let it pain/hurt me
- Region of origin: South-west Nigeria

Other names
- Short form: Majek

pronunciation

Majekodunmi is a masculine Yoruba name from Nigeria. Morphologically, it breaks down into má-jẹ́-kí-ó-dùn-mí, meaning "Do Not Let It Pain/hurt Me" (má - do not, jẹ́ - let, kí - that, ó - it, dùn - pain, mí - me). This name conveys a desire for protection and comfort.

Notable people with the name include:

- Kaelan Majekodunmi, Australian soccer player
- Moses Majekodunmi, Nigerian obstetrician and gynaecologist
- Ola Majekodunmi, Nigerian-Irish presenter, writer and producer
- Desmond Majekodunmi, Nigerian climate activist
- Josiah Majekodunmi, Nigerian high jumper
- Olufemi Majekodunmi, British-Nigerian architect
- Benedict Majekodunmi, Nigerian sprinter
- Majek Fashek, Nigerian musician
