= LUFASI Park =

Park in Lagos Nigeria

Coordinates: 6°27′50″N 3°39′17″E

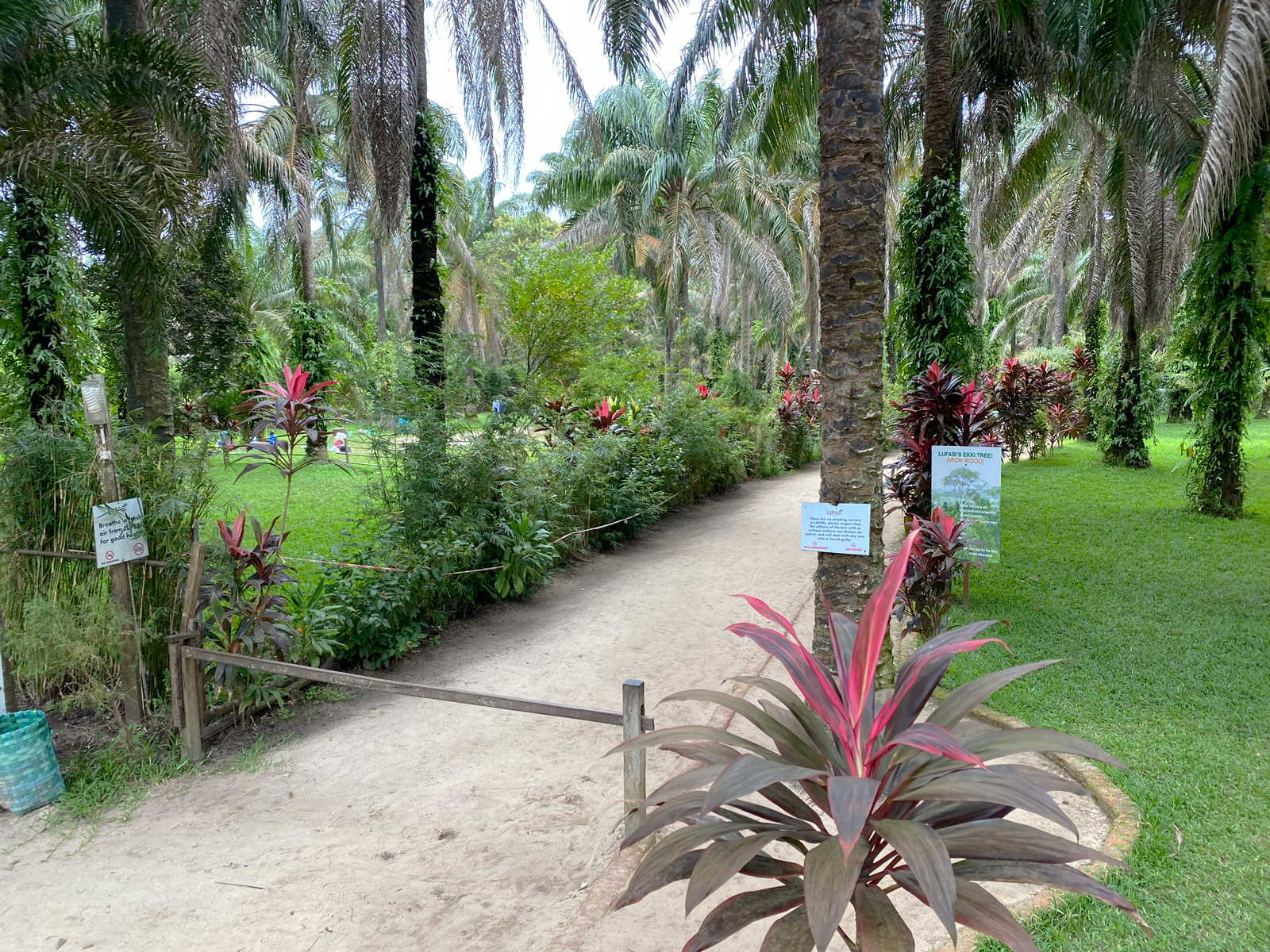
Entrance area

LUFASI Park is a 20-hectare nature park on the outskirts of Lagos, Nigeria, that specialises in eco-tourism.

LUFASI stands for Lekki Urban Forestry and Animal Shelter Initiative and is situated at KM41 on the Lekki-Epe Expressway. LUFASI was established in 2013 by an NGO under its founder Desmond Majekodunmi. It is "dedicated to the preservation of natural habitats in urban areas for use as a field laboratory to interact with and learn from nature". It "serves as an urban hub for learning, recreation and awareness on climate change and the natural environment".

There is a wildlife park and a children's playground; one can hire bikes to go trail cycling or follow the paths through the jungle on foot. You can spend the night in a ‘Geo-Dome’ surrounded by nature, take part in a painting or pottery workshop, or practise yoga. Further activities are kayaking and fishing at lake Nora, picnicking and bird watching.

Photographers, content creators and filmmakers appreciate the picturesque backdrop of the nature park.

The place is not overcrowded and offers a tranquillity that is rare in Lagos. It is opened from 9 am to 6 pm.

== Gallery ==
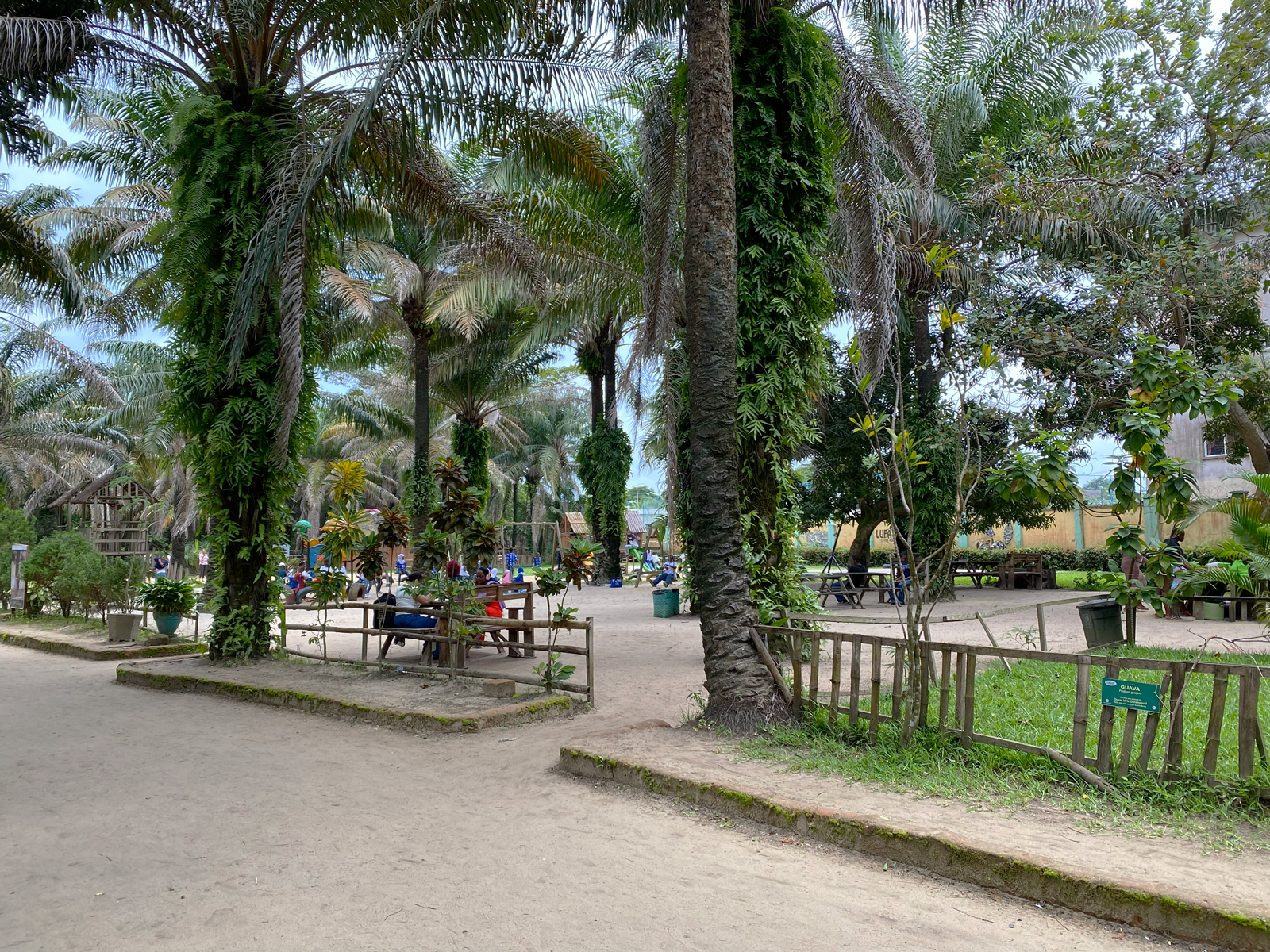

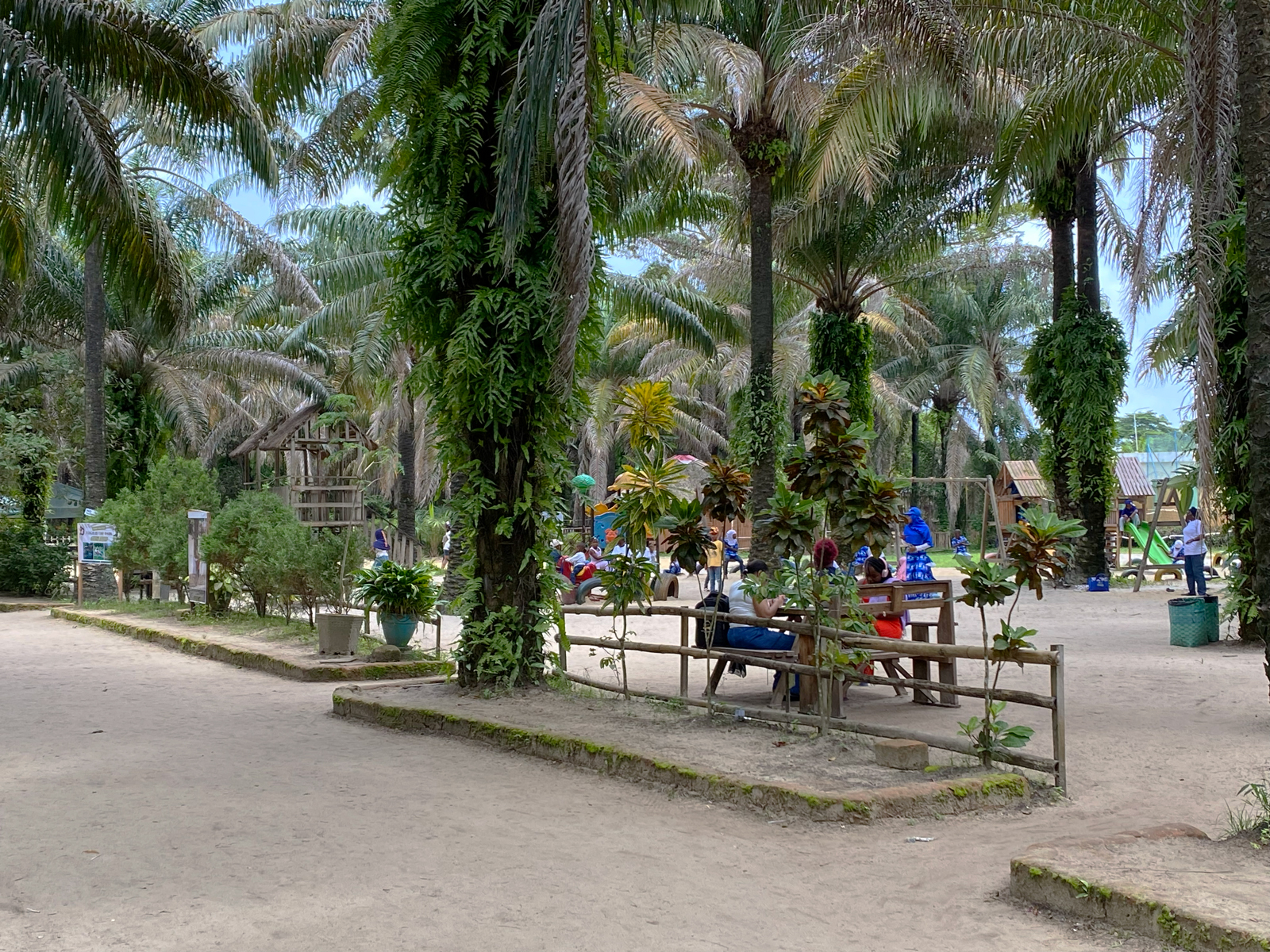

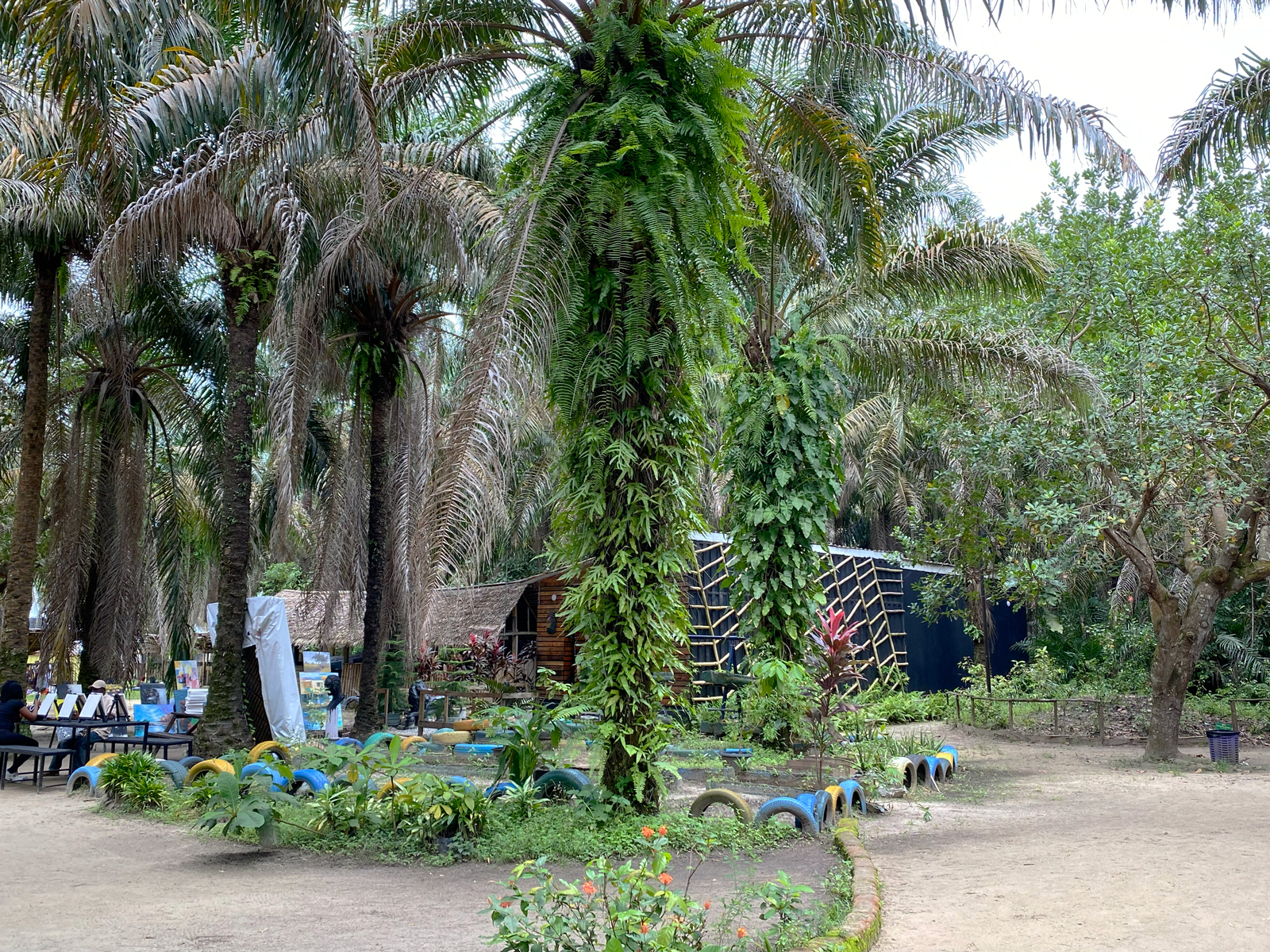

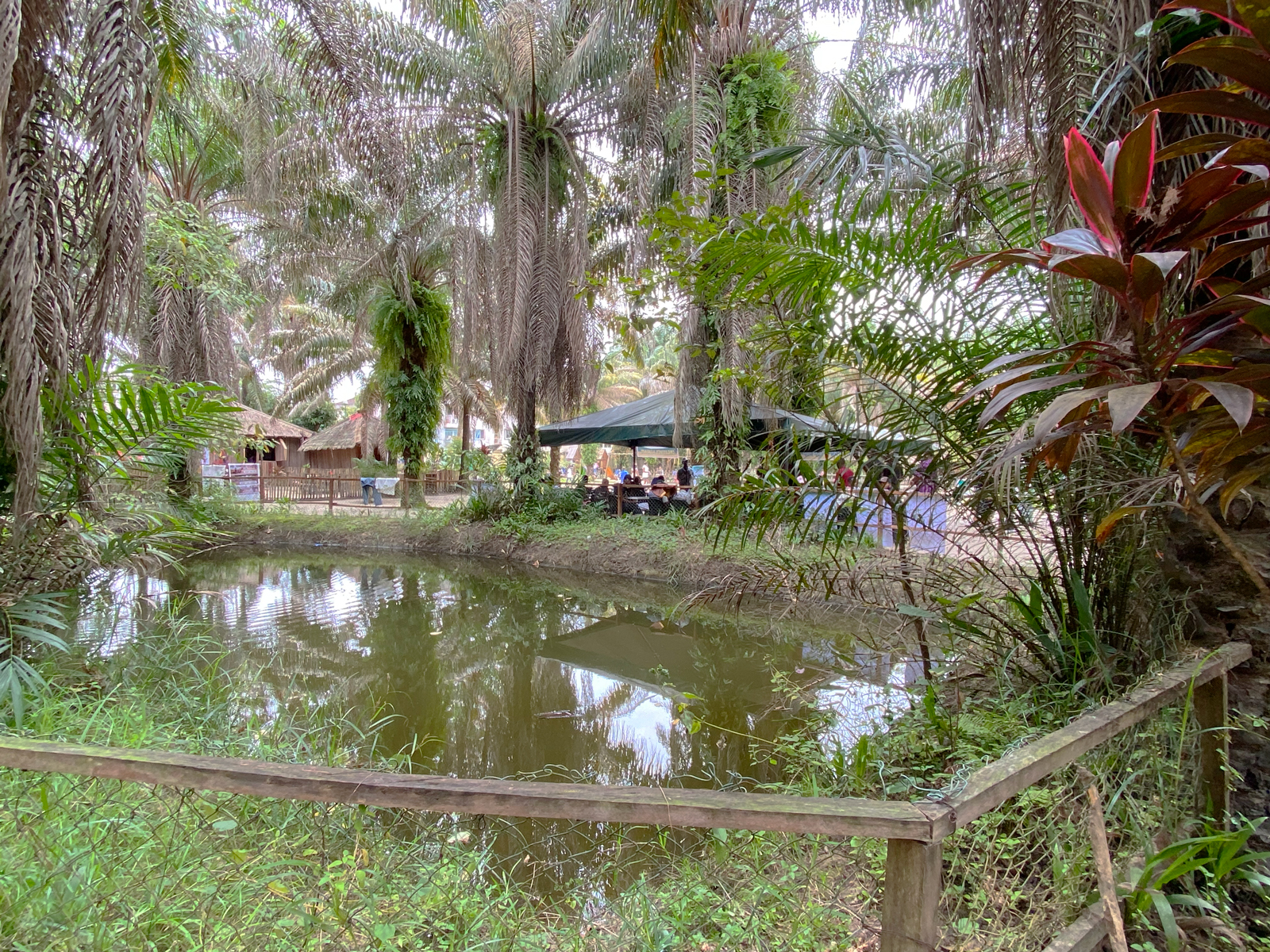

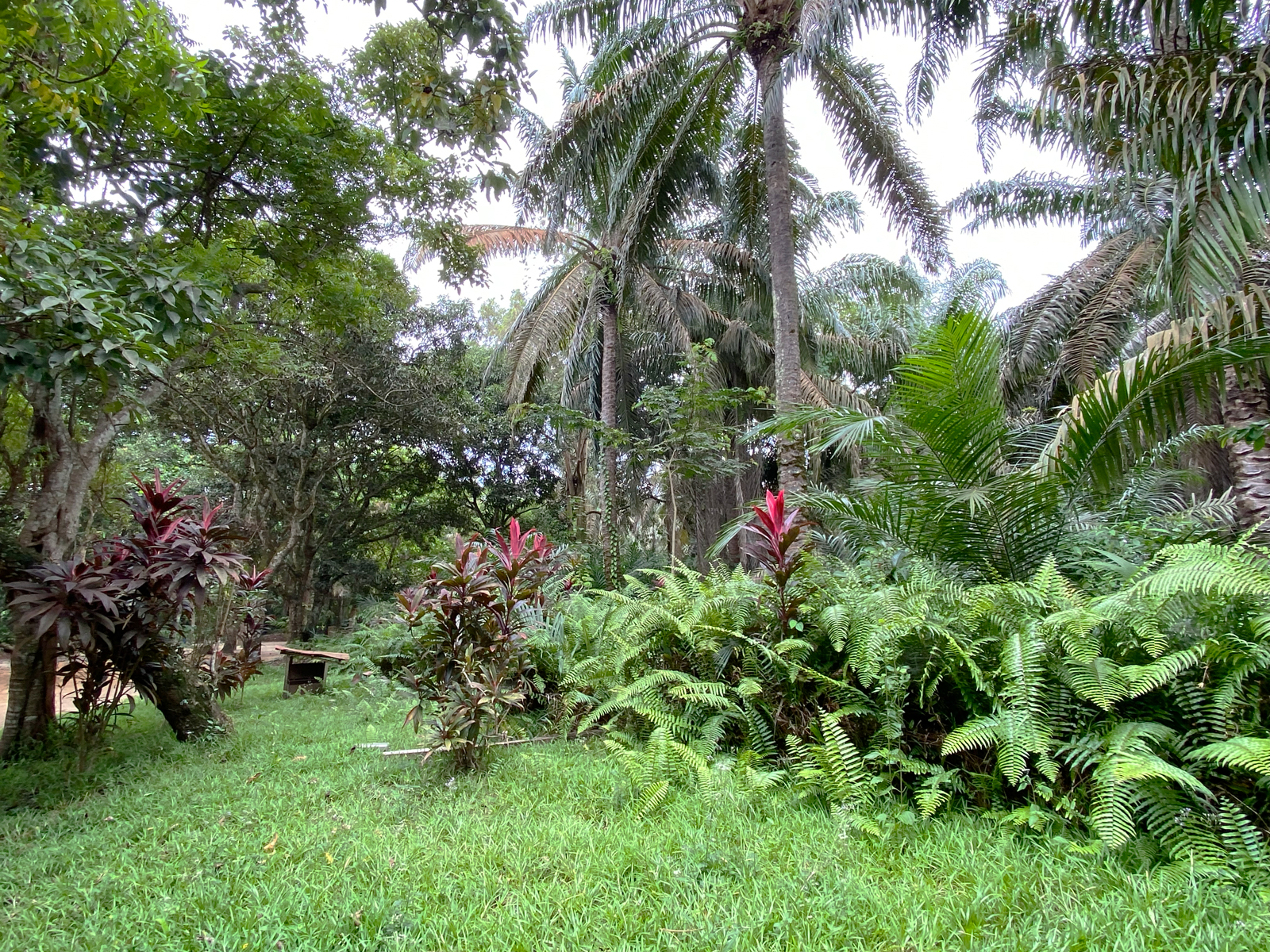

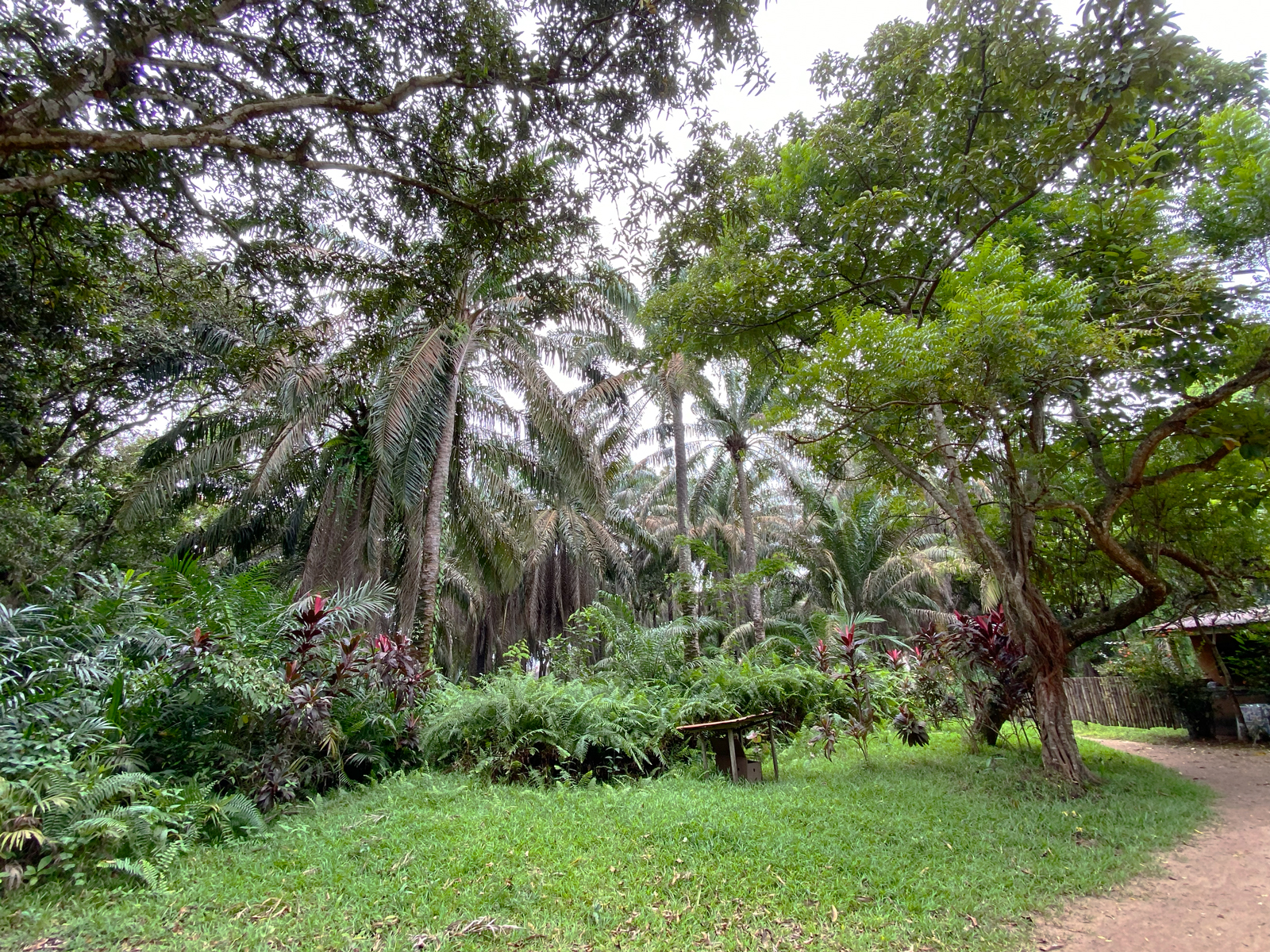

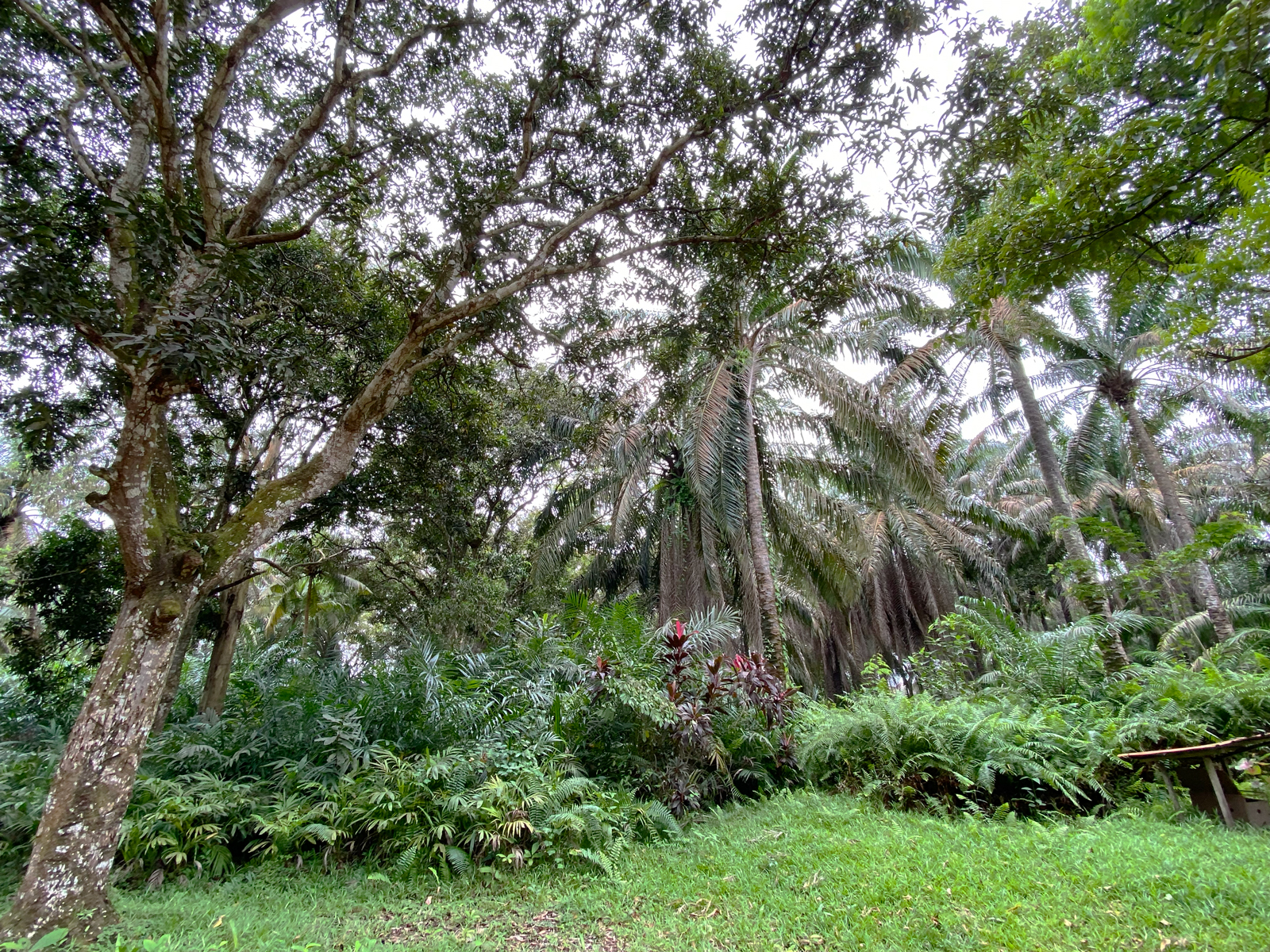

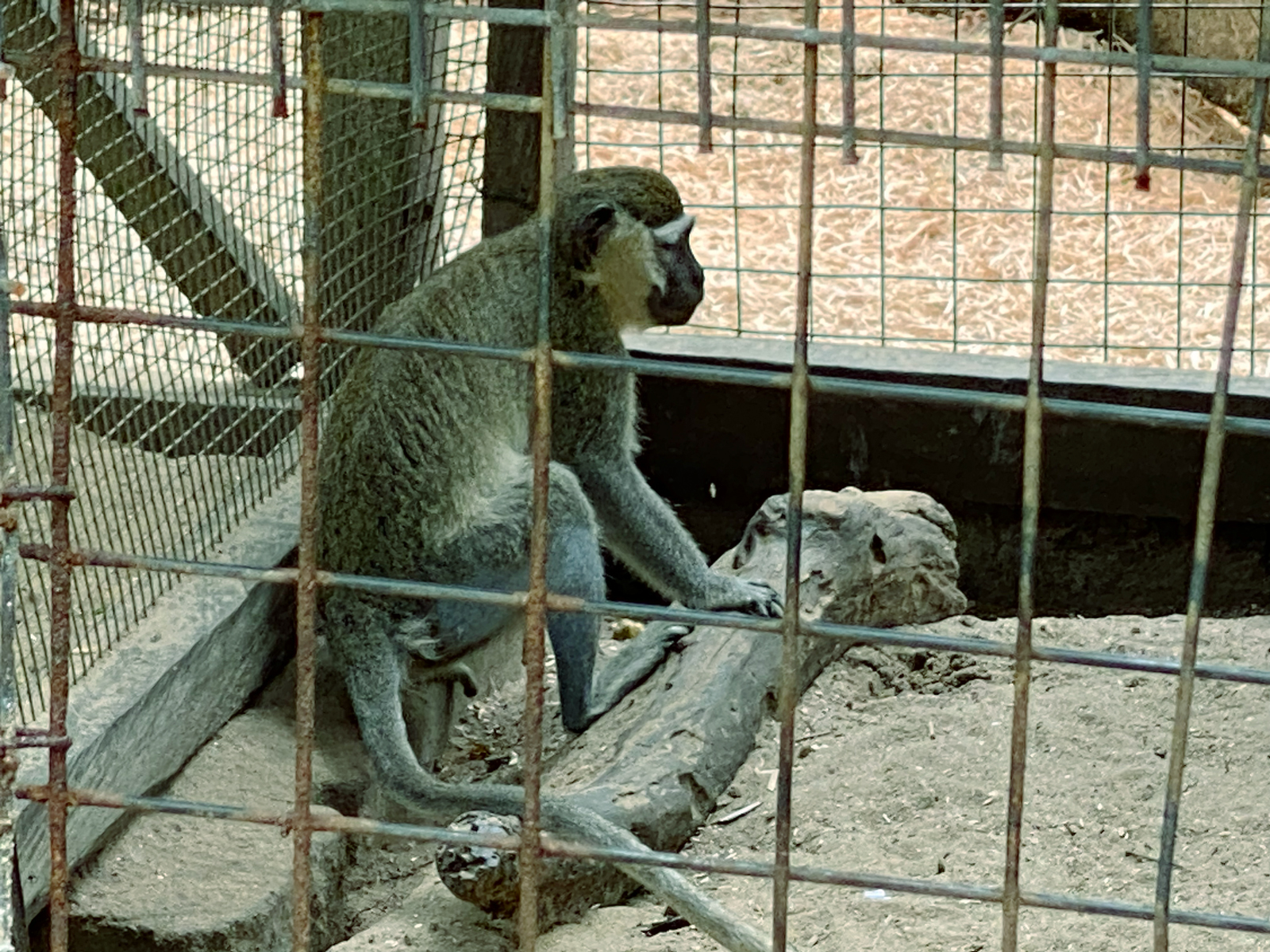

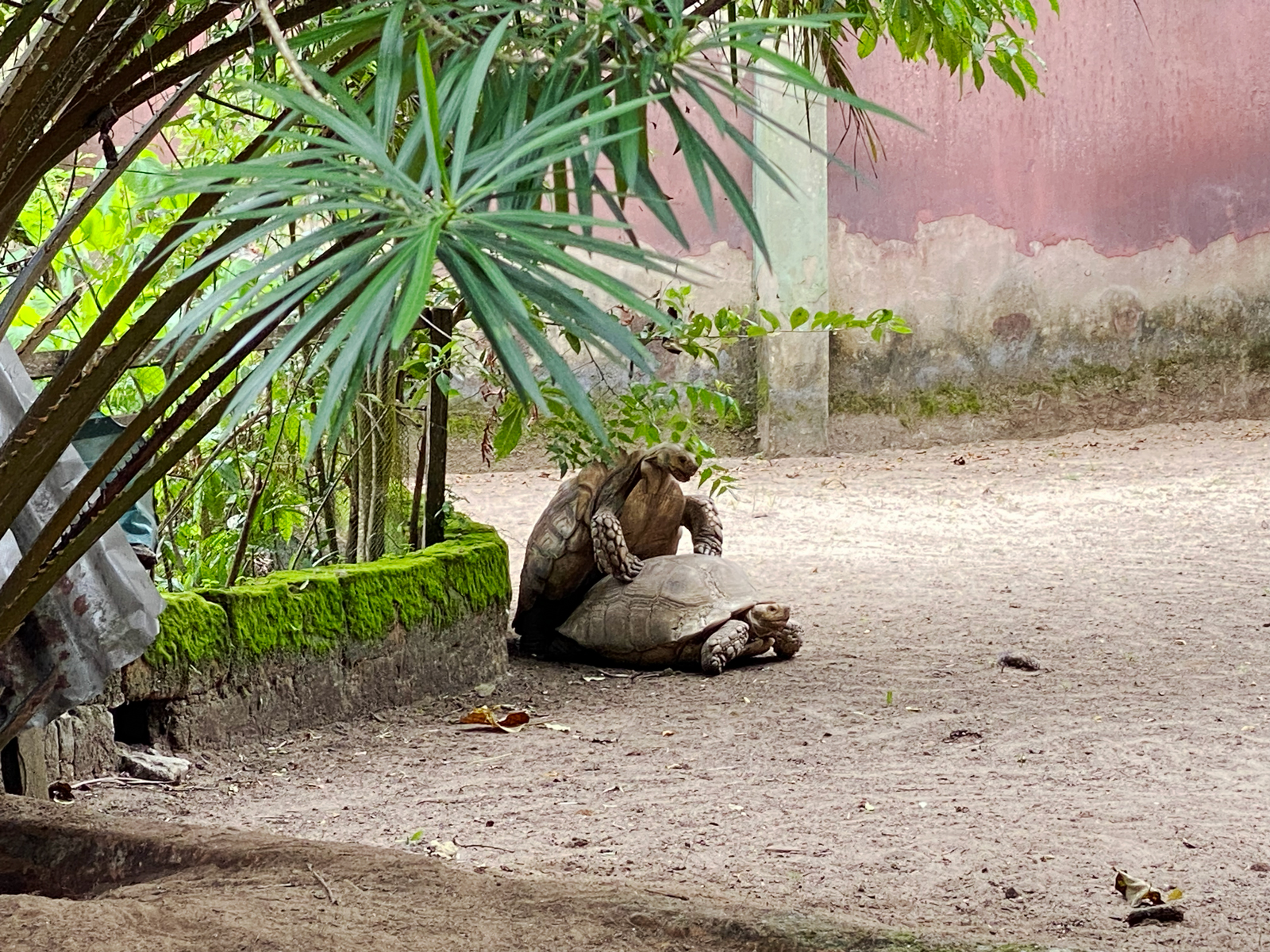

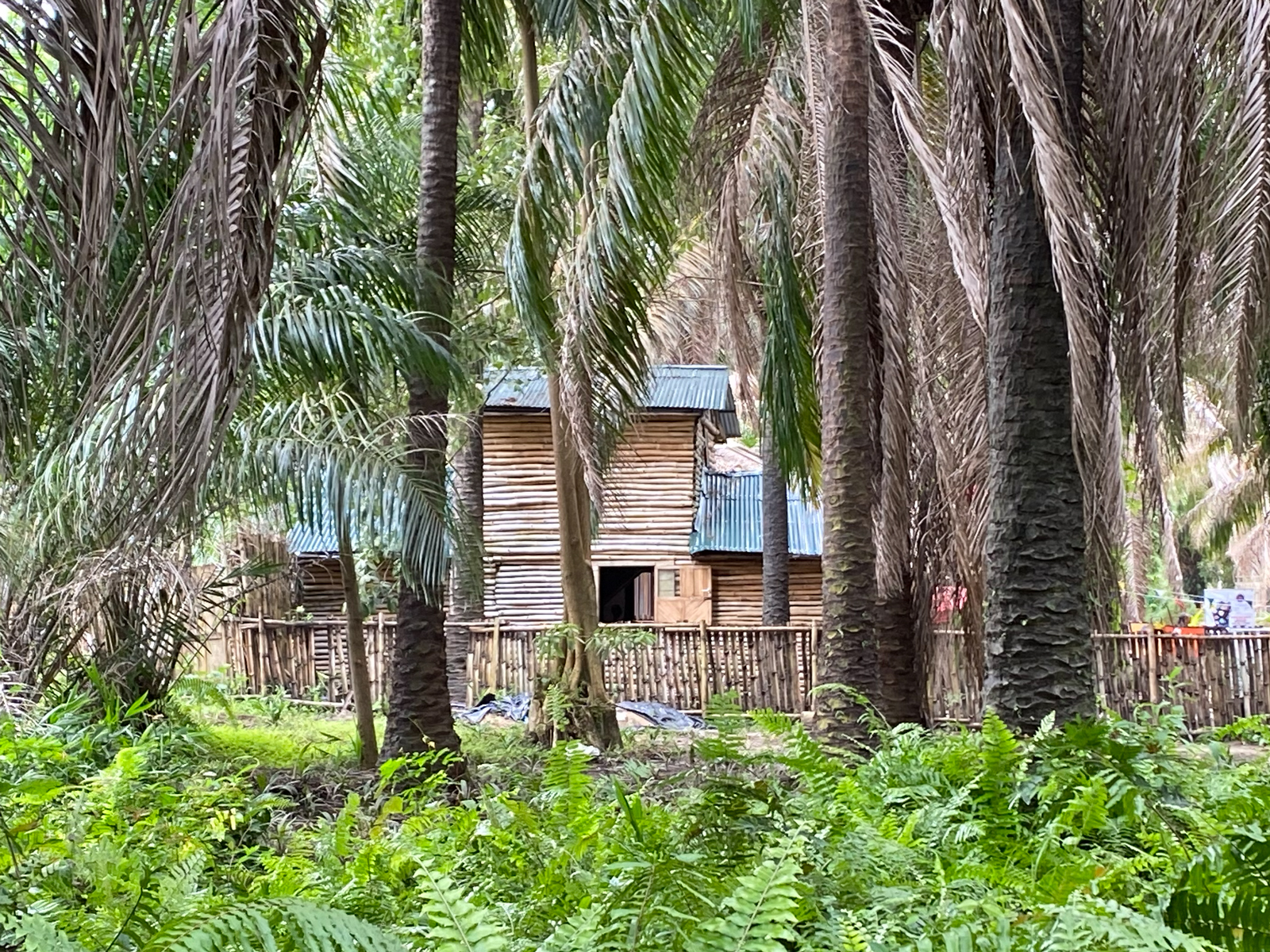

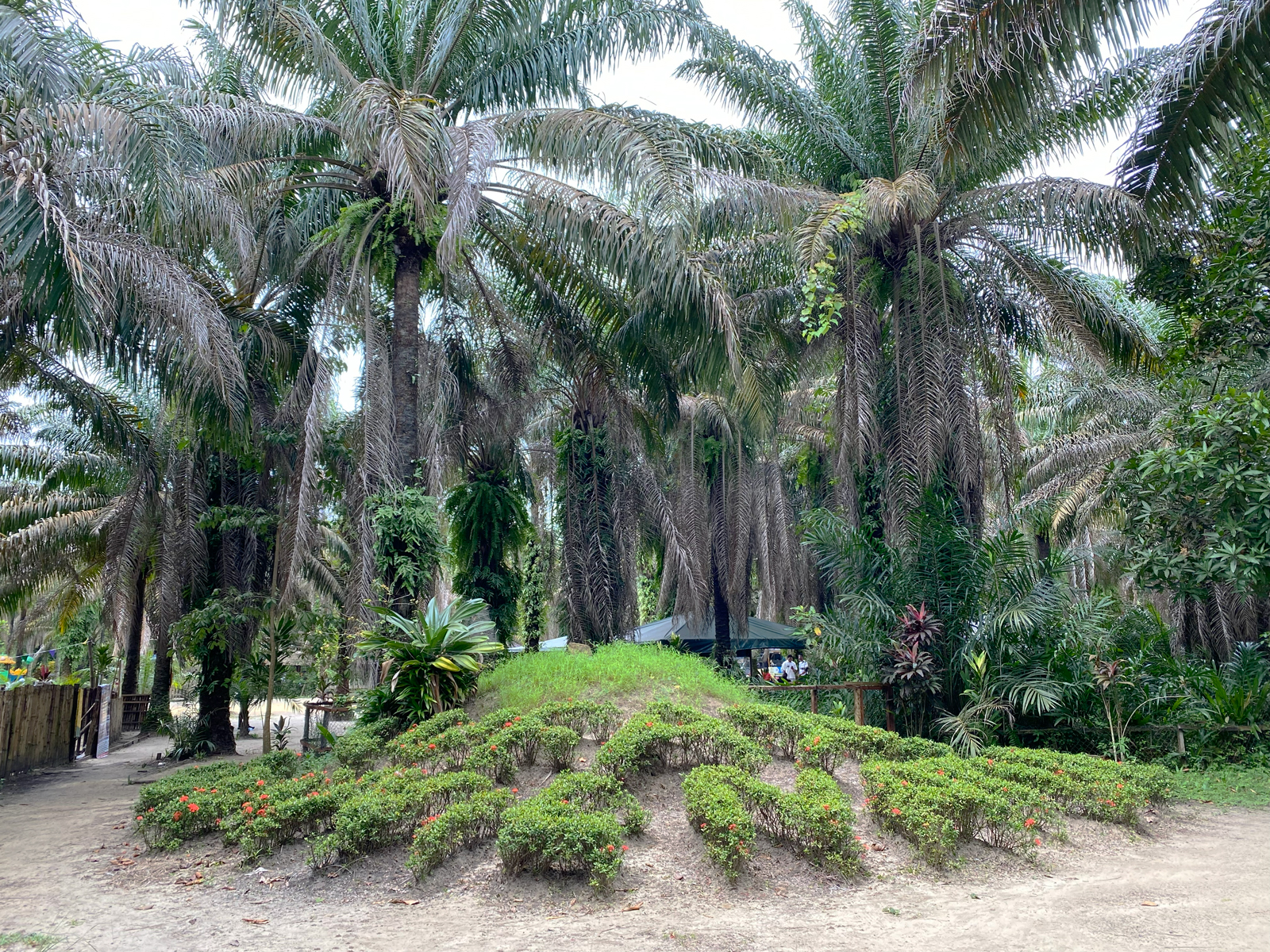

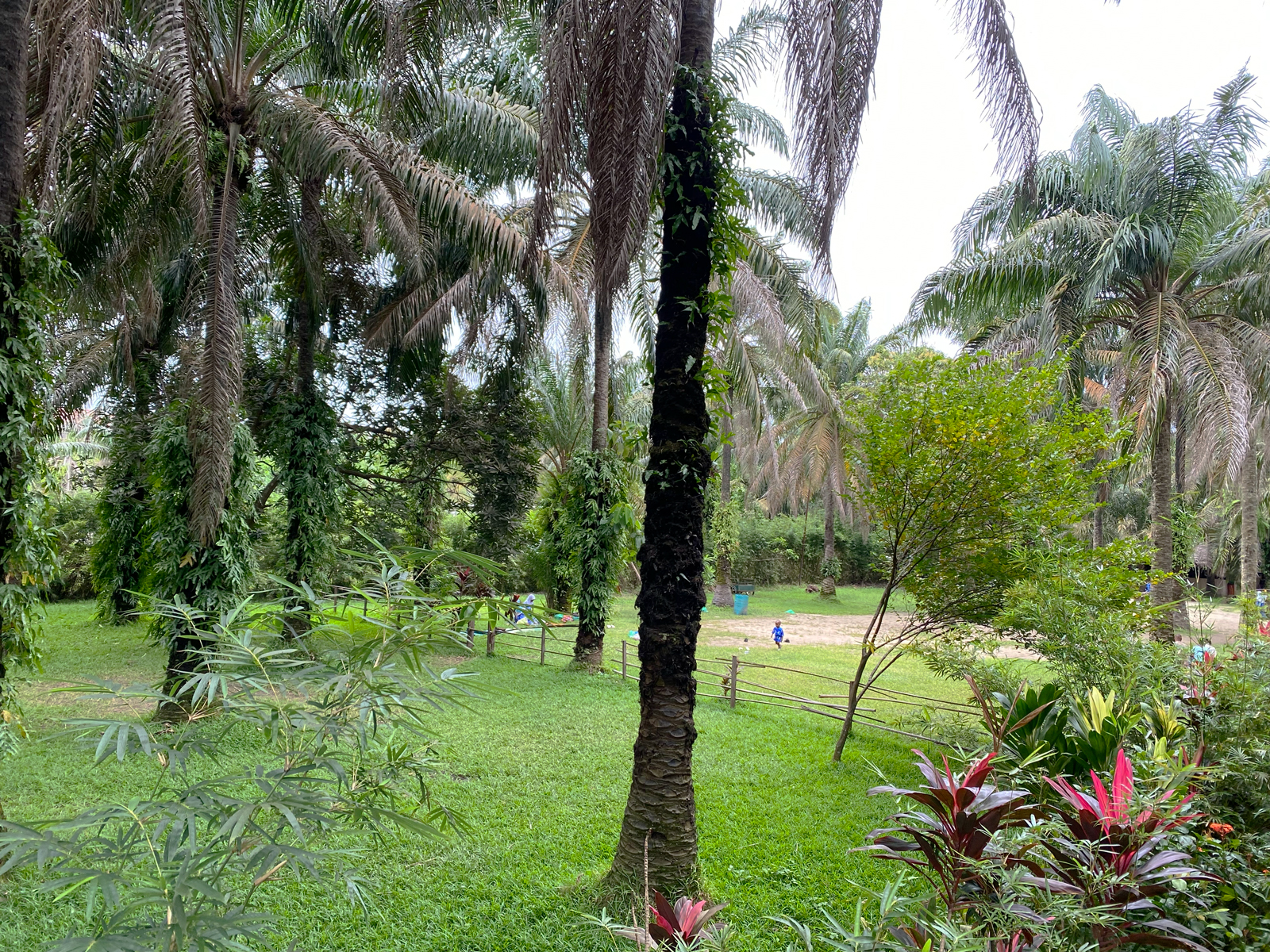
