= Joseph Fadahunsi =

Nigerian politician and businessman

His Excellency Oloye Sir Joseph Odeleye Fadahunsi KBE

Governor of the Western Region, Nigeria
- In office December 1962 – 16 January 1966
- Preceded by: Adesoji Aderemi
- Succeeded by: Adekunle Fajuyi

Personal details
- Born: 1901 Ilesha, Osun State
- Died: 12 May 1986 (aged 85) Ilesha, Osun State

Oloye Sir Joseph Odeleye Fadahunsi, KBE (1901 – 12 May 1986) was a Nigerian businessman and politician who was a vice president of the National Council of Nigeria and the Cameroons. He also represented the Ilesha district in the House of Assembly during the nation's first republic. An Oloye of the Yoruba people, he subsequently served as the governor of the Western Region of Nigeria.

== Life ==
Fadahunsi was born in Ilesa in 1901. He was educated at Osu Methodist Elementary School and then attended Wesley College, Ibadan. Fadahunsi started work as a teacher at a government assisted school in Ilesha and later taught at schools in Lagos and Ikorodu. Uninterested in teaching, he asked the head of management of the school he was teaching at to assist in a career in commerce. The head subsequently introduced him to United Trading Company (UTC).

Fadahunsi developed a relationship with UTC in 1927 and became a buyer under the United Trading Company, a branch of the Swiss Lutheran Church's missionary association, the Basle Mission. He started his business buying cocoa from farmers and hiring transporters to deliver the produce to the Ibadan office of the United Trading Company. He then earned enough profits to buy his own transport vehicles and his enterprise soon expanded into the transport sector. He founded Ijesa United Trading and Transport Company Ltd to transport produce from his other businesses and also service other commercial firms. His transport business began to earn in some regional recognition. In the late 1940s, he became member of the boards of the Nigerian Cocoa Marketing Board and the Western Region Production Development Board.

In 1951, Fadaunsi joined National Council of Nigeria and the Cameroons, he was elected to the regional House of Assembly as a representative of Ilesa South West. At the assembly, he was deputy leader of the opposition. In 1962, a fracture in the ruling party in the Western region led to the creation of the United People's Party by a splinter group led by the regional premier. The group then went into a coalition with NCNC members. Fadahunsi was appointed as Governor of the region in 1962.

Region	Period	Governor	Premier	Notes
Eastern Region	Oct 1960 - Jan 1966	Francis Akanu Ibiam	Michael Okpara	
Mid-Western Region	Aug 1963 - Feb 1964	Dennis Osadebay	Dennis Osadebay (Administrator)	Region created from part of Western Region on 8 August 1963
Mid-Western Region	Feb 1964 - Jan 1966	Jereton Mariere	Dennis Osadebay	
Northern Region	Oct 1960 - 1962	Gawain Westray Bell	Ahmadu Bello	
Northern Region	1962 - Jan 1966	Kashim Ibrahim	Ahmadu Bello	
Western Region	Oct 1960 - May 1962	Adesoji Aderemi	Samuel Ladoke Akintola	
Western Region	May 1962 - Dec 1962	Adesoji Aderemi	Moses Majekodunmi (Administrator)	Administrator appointed during political crisis
Western Region	Jan 1963 - Jan 1966	Joseph Fadahunsi	Samuel Akintola	
