= Olufemi Majekodunmi =

British-Nigerian architect (1940–2026)

- Born: Olufemi Adetokunbo Majekodunmi; 1 May 1940; London, England
- Died: 5 June 2026 (aged 86)
- Education: Glasgow School of Art; Kingston University
- Occupation: Architect
- Practice: FMA Architects Ltd
- Buildings: Botswana Police College; St. Nicholas Hospital, Lagos; Sterling Tower, Lagos; NAL Office Building; Standard Chartered Bank Building, Lagos; South African High Commission, Abuja; Total Head Office, Lagos

Olufemi Adetokunbo Majekodunmi (1 May 1940 – 5 June 2026) was a British-Nigerian architect.

== Early life and education ==
Olufemi was born in London, England, on 1 May 1940, to Moses Majekodunmi and Tomi Agbebi. He grew up in Nigeria and attended St Gregory's College, Lagos. He later returned to the United Kingdom to study architecture at the Glasgow School of Art, Kingston College of Art (now Kingston University) and graduated in 1966.

== Career ==
After graduation, Femi worked for some years with firms in Washington, D.C. Afterwards, he returned to Nigeria and worked with Godwin and Hopwood Architects, Lagos before establishing his architectural firm, then Femi Majekodunmi Associates, now FMA Architects Ltd, in Nigeria in 1973. The firm has grown to a large practice, with branch locations in Botswana and South Africa. He worked with various architectural organizations to advance the practice of architecture in countries across Africa. He was closely associated with many architectural organizations. He was the first president of the Nigerian Institute of Architects, the first secretary of the African Union of Architects and a past president of the International Union of Architects from 1990 to 1993.

Majekodunmi was a Fellow of the Nigerian Institute of Architects and a member of the Royal Institute of British Architects. He was Juror for several competitions including WAN Awards for World Architecture. He was an Associate Professor of Architecture at the University of Lagos.

== Personal life and death ==
Majekodunmi was married to Victoria Majekodunmi. They had four children. He died on 5 June 2026, at the age of 86.

== See also ==
- List of Nigerian architects
