= Botswana Police College =

Police College in Botswana

The Botswana Police College is located in Otse in the South East District. An ultra-modern new college campus for meeting the training needs of the Botswana Police Service was designed by FMA Architects Ltd (Canadian Architect - Samuel Oboh - was a resident Architect on this project), constructed by Stocks Building Africa and completed in 2000 at a cost of 230 million Pula.

The police college shares its campus with the International Law Enforcement Academies' Gaborone academy, known as ILEA Gaborone. It is here where law enforcement officers from more than 25 countries across Africa come to learn the latest in law enforcement techniques.

A certain number of points are required to train at the Botswana Police College. A rule change in 2018 meant that Special Constables were no longer automatically considered for admission to the college when their two-year contracts ended.

== See also ==
- Botswana Police Service
