= City Hall, Lagos =

Government building in Lagos, Nigeria

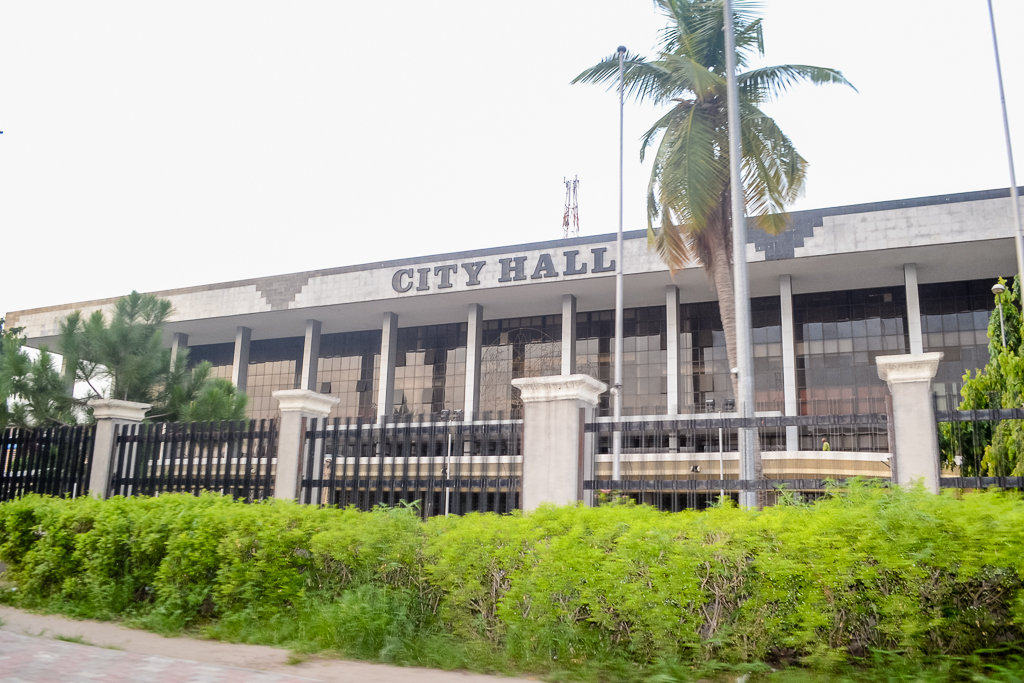
City Hall, Lagos

The Lagos City Hall, established in 1900, is the secretariat of the oldest local government in Nigeria. It is located within the Brazilian quarters, right in the center of the Lagos business district. It is also adjacent to King's College, Lagos, St. Nicholas Hospital, Lagos and Cathedral of the Holy Cross, Lagos.

The City Hall used to be the local government headquarters with other area offices serving the entire local governments in colonial Lagos and after Nigeria's independence. The City hall was the fountain of local government administration in Nigeria and the secretariat of the Lagos Island local government, the doyen of Nigeria's native or grassroots administration since 1900. The hall is a historical, political and cultural landmark for metropolitan Lagos.
