= Sarah Richards =

South African sculptor working in bronze (born 1968)

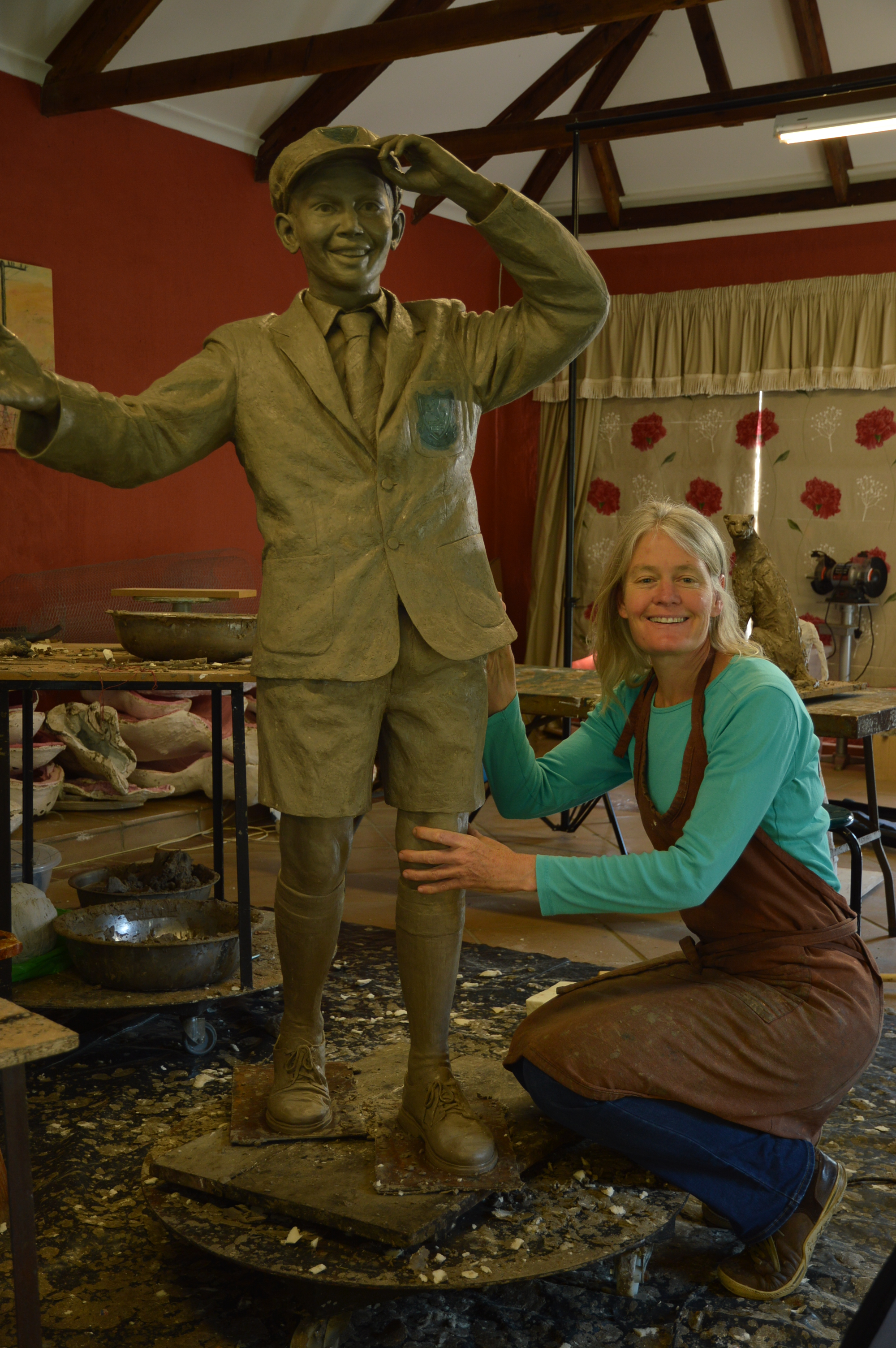
Sarah Richards with wax model of her bronze sculpture of a school boy.

Sarah Richards (born 28 September 1968) is a South African sculptor working in bronze.

From 1985 to 1990 she studied fine art at the Durban Technikon, where she majored in sculpture. During the next four years she travelled overseas to gain experience and insight. She then returned to Durban to both create art and teach art. She completed her master's degree in fine art (cum laude) at the Durban University of Technology in 2008. Richards lives and practises art in the KwaZulu-Natal midlands of South Africa.

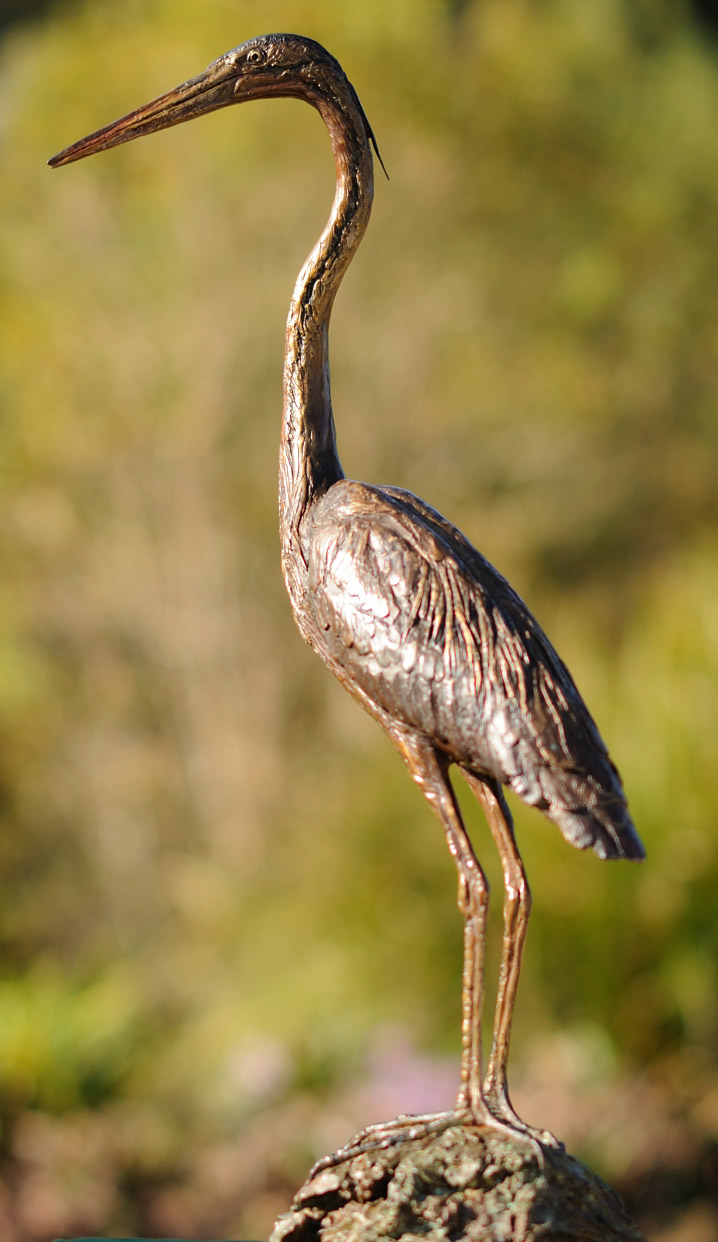
Bronze sculpture of a Purple Heron, created by artist Sarah Richards

Richards has been creating bronze sculptures for the past 30 years. Her sculptures show attention to detail and give an impression of movement and animation. In creating a sculpture she uses a mixture of media, including wax and plasticine, which allows fluidity and detail. Her solo exhibitions include two at ArtSPACE in Durban. Group exhibitions include those at St. Lorient Fashion & Art Gallery and Cherie de Villiers Gallery in Johannesburg and Foundryman's Choice in Paarl. Her commissions include one of King Nyabela for the National Heritage Project and Fish Eagles for the Nedbank Golf Challenge at Sun City.
