= Technikon Natal =

- Motto: Per Adua Ad Alta
- Type: Public University of Technology
- Established: 1907
- Location: Durban, Kwa-Zulu Natal, South Africa

Technikon Natal is located in Durban, KwaZulu-Natal, South Africa and has now merged with ML Sultan Technikon to form the Durban University of Technology.

== History ==
Technikon Natal was founded by Dr Samuel George Campbell in 1907. In 1912, three new premises were opened in Warwick Avenue, Smith Street and West Street along with their official crest and motto; Per Adua Ad Alta. Legislation of 1967 was a watershed for education in South Africa as it moved to provide exclusively for the needs of the white population group. Between 1953 and 1965, the provinces shed ‘bantu’, ‘colored’ and ‘Indian’ education and become responsible for ‘white’ education only. In August 1991, the approval of the Certification Council for Technikon Education authorized Technikon Natal to issue its own certificates or diplomas to graduates, representing an important development for technikons. Due to the 1994 democratic elections, in 1995 for the first time on registration day, an applicant did not have to state his or her race or colour. Finally in April 2002, ML Sultan merged with Technikon Natal to form the Durban University of Technology.
