= Botswana Police Service =

Agency overview
- Formed: 1 July 1884
- Employees: 9,500

Jurisdictional structure
- Operations jurisdiction: Botswana
- Map of Botswana Police Service's jurisdiction
- Governing body: Government of Botswana
- General nature: Civilian police

Operational structure
- Headquarters: Gaborone, Botswana

The Botswana Police Service is the police service of Botswana and it is a part of Ministry for State President, Justice and Security. The force has 9,500 police officers.

== History ==
=== Colonial era ===
The service has its origins in the Bechuanaland Mounted Police, which was formed on 1 July 1884. The Bechuanaland Border Police were formed on 4 Aug 1885. In October 1889 a royal charter established the British South Africa Company's Police, which absorbed part of the BBP. During the 1890s the various police forces in the area went through a number of name changes until BSAP No.1 (Bechuanaland) Division ceased to exist, becoming the Bechuanaland Protectorate Police. This force recruited few Bechuanaland natives, instead it mostly recruited black constables in Basutoland (modern Lesotho), Rhodesia (modern Zimbabwe) and Zambia.

=== Post-Independence ===
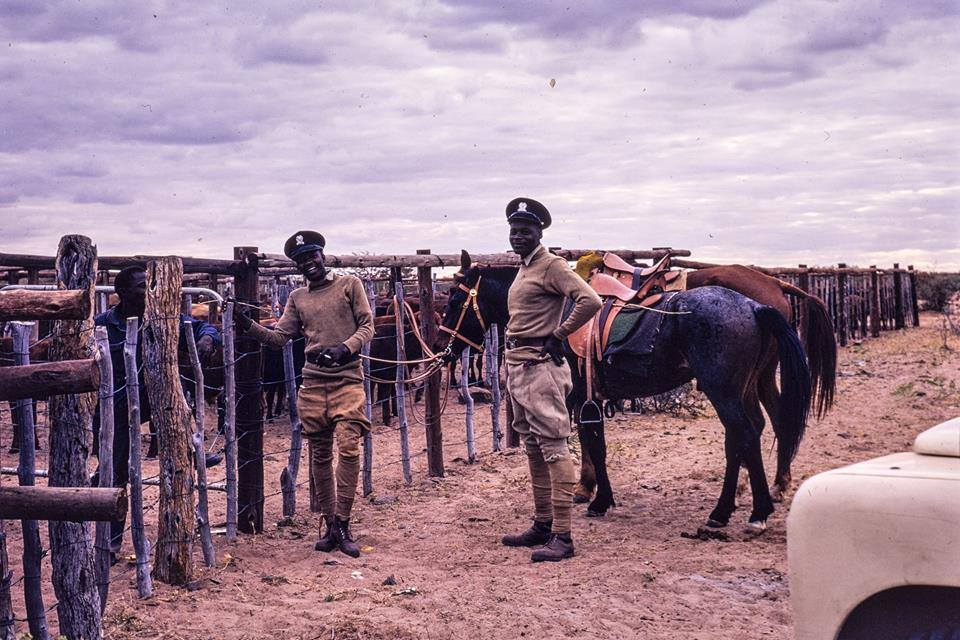
Two Botswanan mounted police officers in 1970s era khaki uniform.

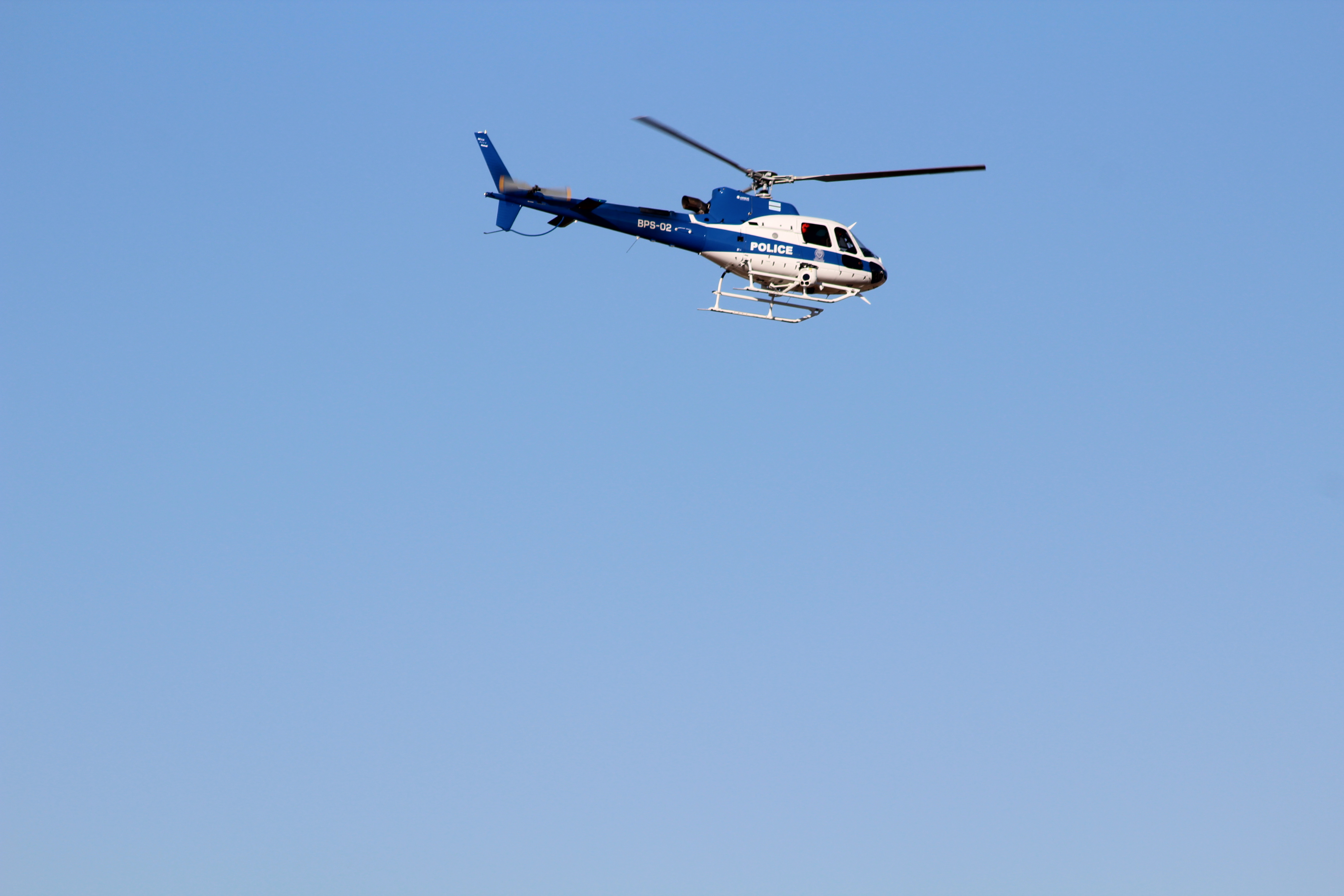
Botswana Police helicopter Eurocopter AS350 Écureuil.

In 1965 following the independence of Botswana the Botswana Police Force, was formed and in 1971 the first female police constables were recruited. In 1977 in a reversal of earlier policy and in response to growing threats to Botswana's security, the Botswana Defence Force was formed. In 2009 the Botswana police force subsumed the Botswana local police to create the Botswana Police Service. The modern Botswana police service is an armed police service of 8500 officers, including 2000 female officers. Botswana Police Service runs a police college near Otse village.

=== Gallery ===
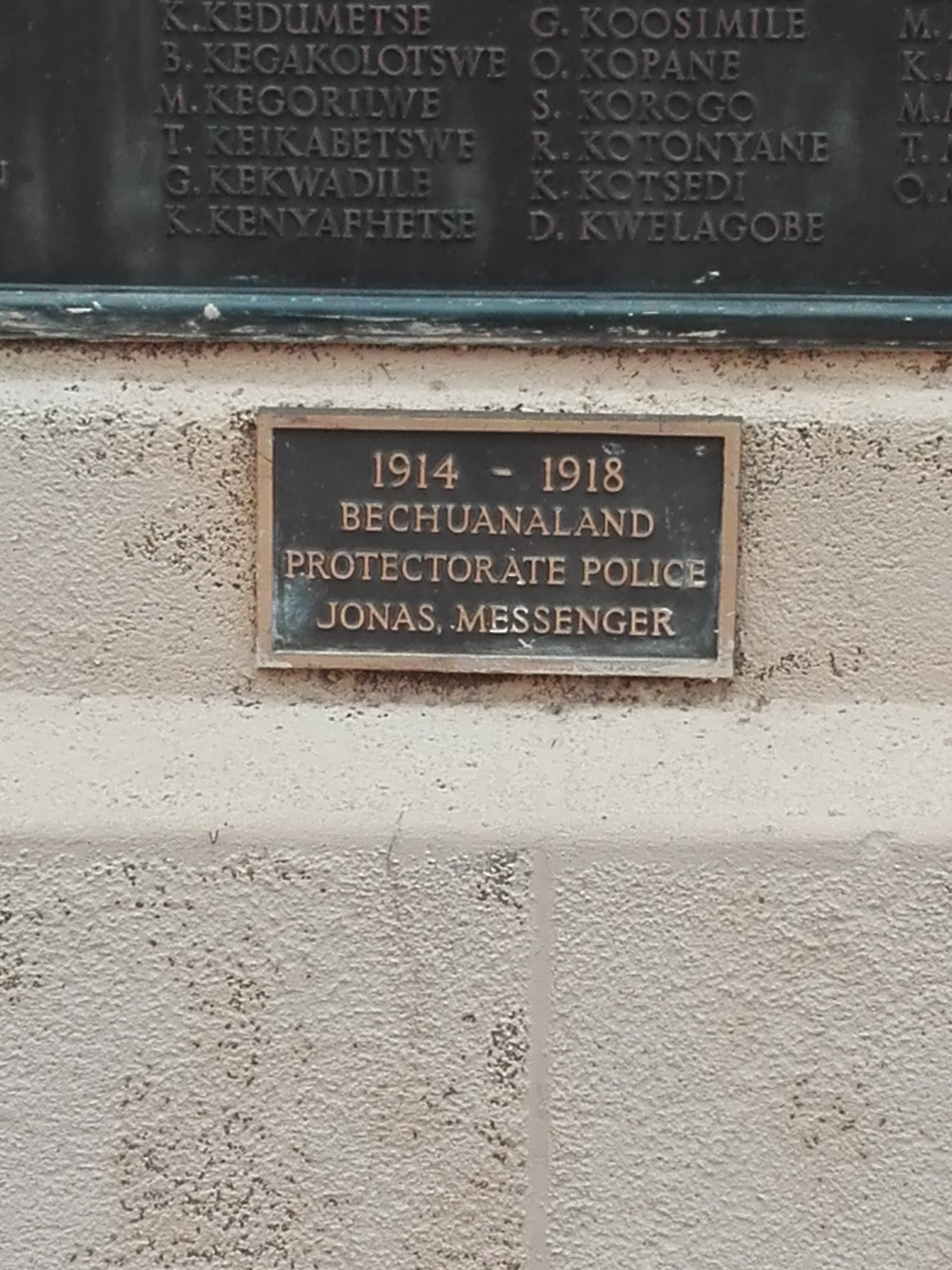

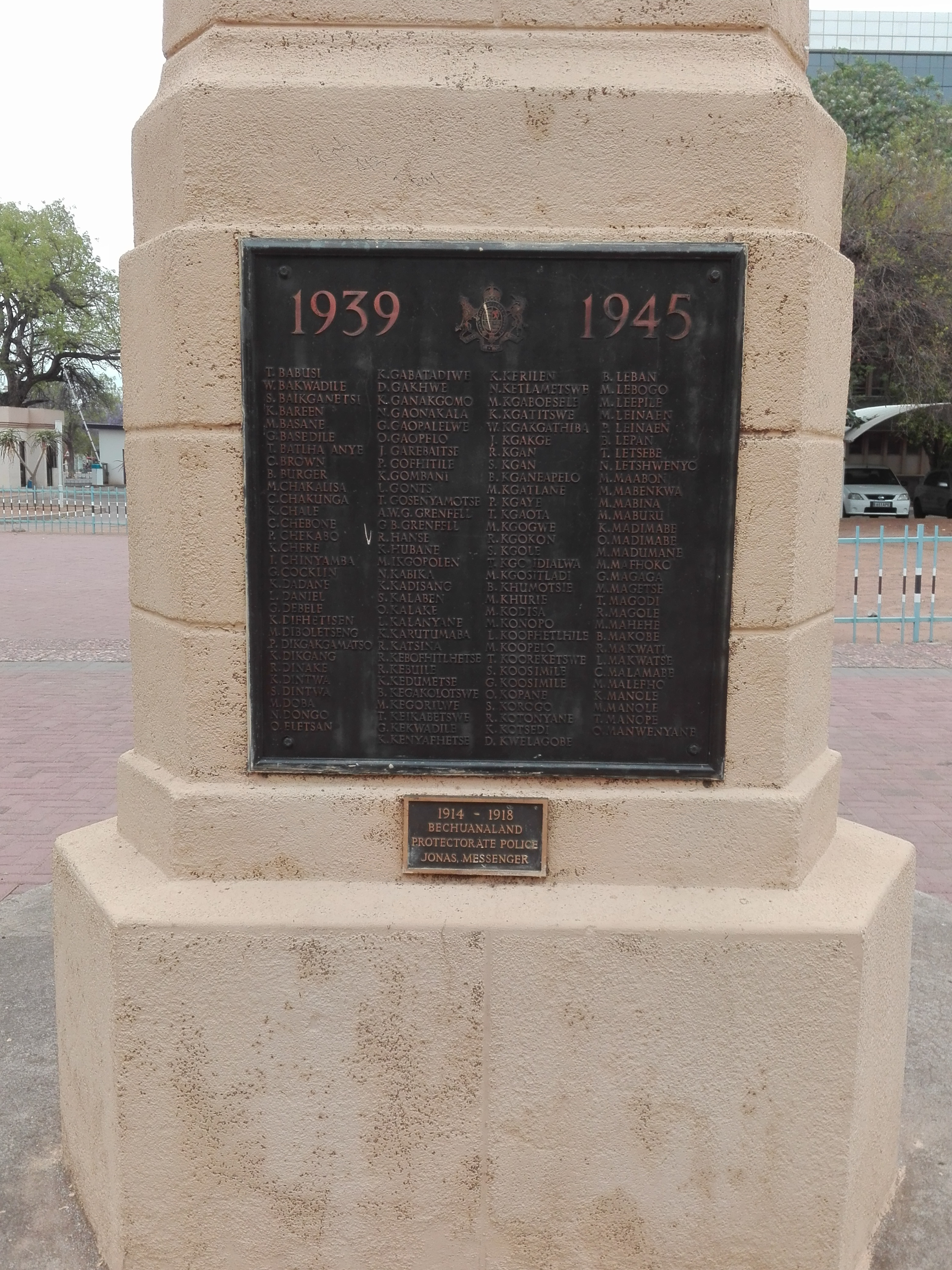

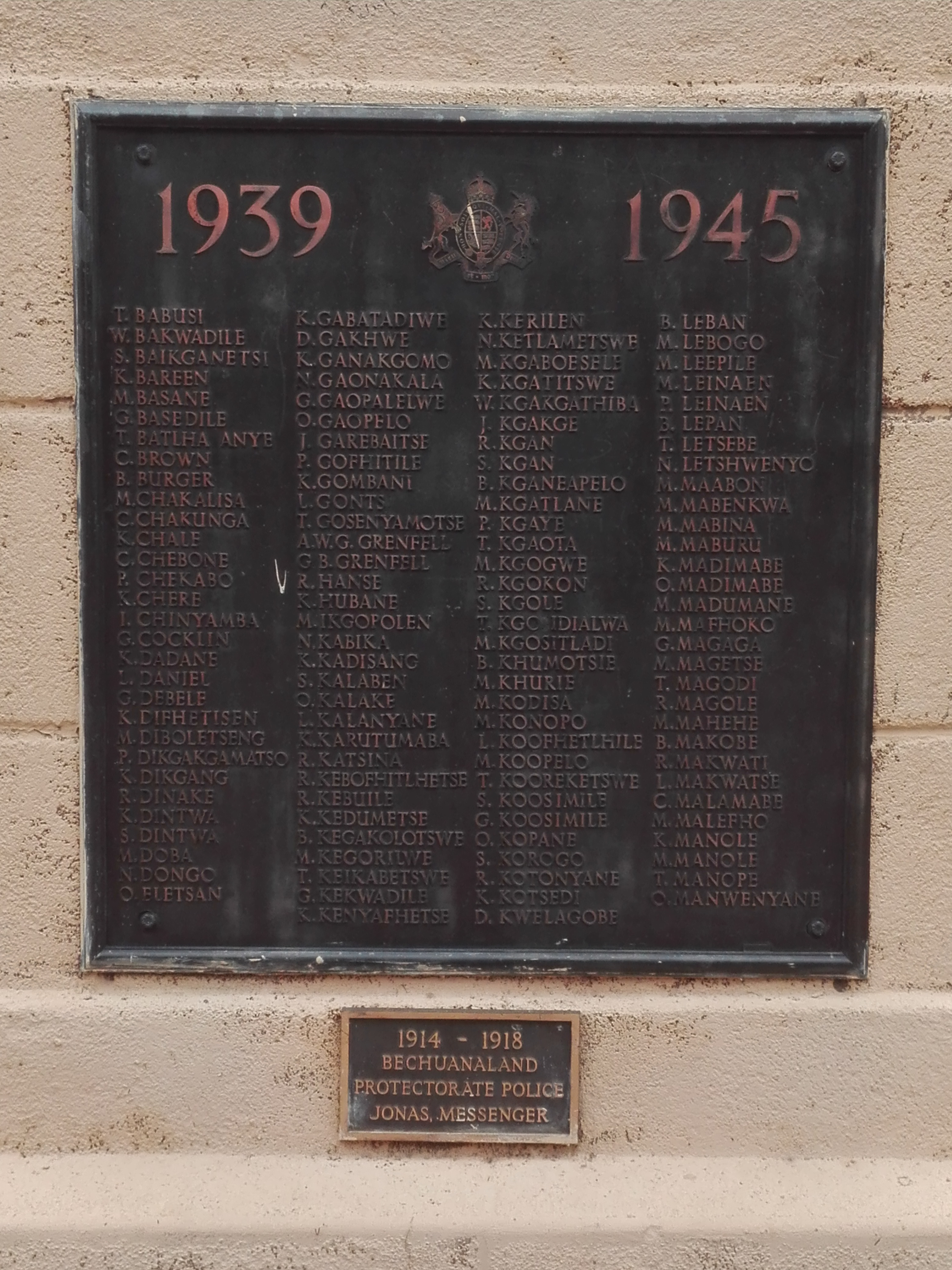

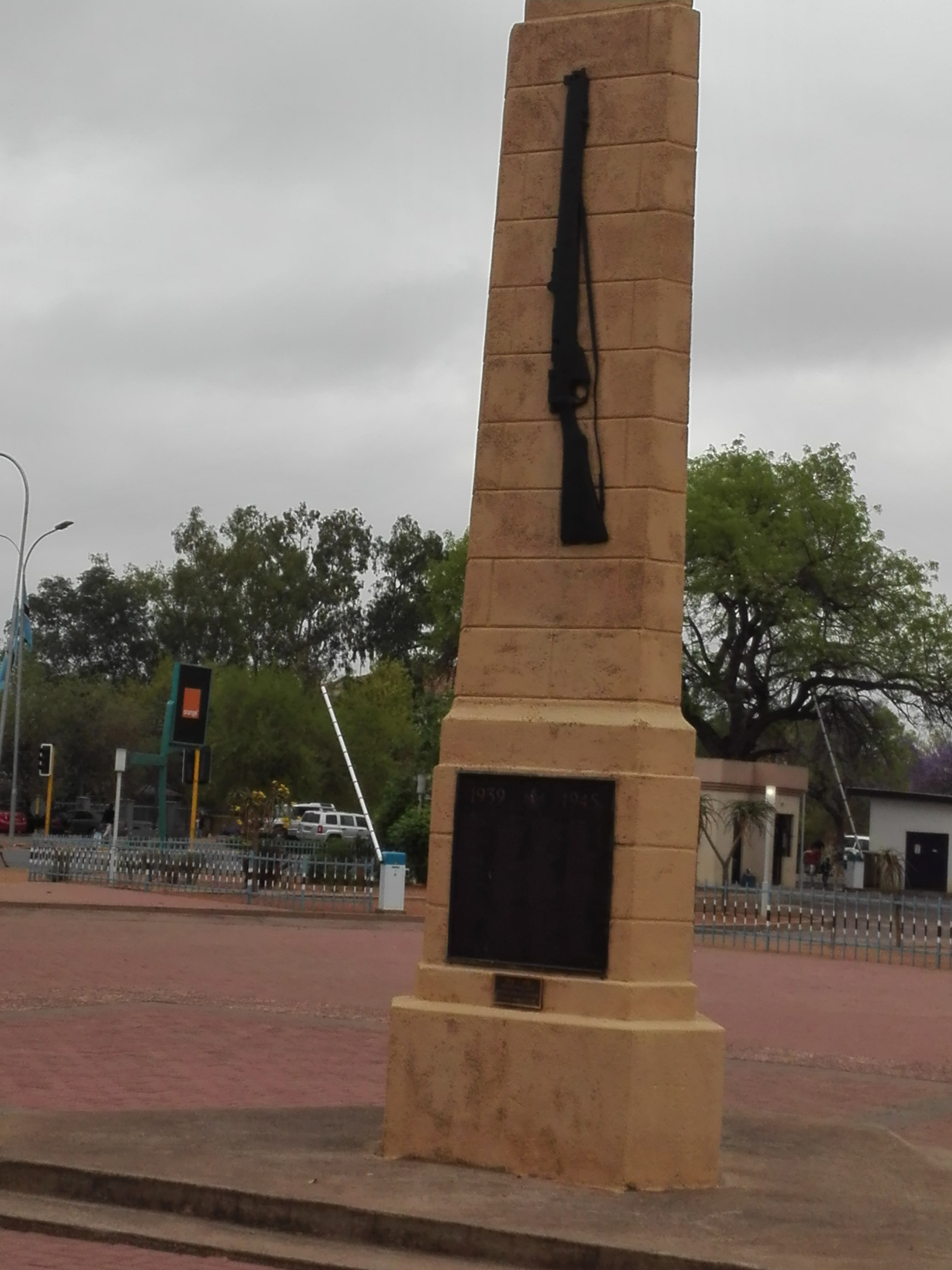

== Structure ==
=== Divisions ===
The force is divided into 5 divisions:

- Northern
- North Central
- Northwest
- Southern
- South Central

=== Ranks ===
- Commissioner of Police,
- Deputy Commissioner of Police,
- Senior Assistant Commissioner,
- Assistant Commissioner,
- Senior Superintendent,
- Superintendent,
- Assistant Superintendent,
- Inspector,
- Sub-Inspector,
- Sergeant,
- Constable,

=== Branches and Divisions ===
The BPS is divided into various branches and the most notable are:

- Special Support Group (SSG)
- Air Support Branch (ASB)
- Transport and Telecommunications Branch (TTB)
- Anti-Stock Theft Unit
- Training Branch
- Crime Intelligence Branch(CRIB)- Detective Superintendent Pensy Thulaganyo Moremedi is the founding member of CRIB.
- Criminal Investigation Department (CID)

The SSG is the paramilitary branch of the BPS and it is run along military lines. Police officers in this branch are called operatives and they undergo 3 months military training upon completion of the mandatory 12 months Police training. The branch is divided into various units/companies:

- SWAT Unit
- Anti Poaching Unit (APU)
- Band Wing Unit (BND)
- City Police Unit (CPU)
- Training Wing Unit (TRG)
- Specialized Unit (SPU)
- Command and Logistics Unit
- 44CES
- A Company (A Coy)
- B Company (B Coy)
- C Company (C Coy)

== See also ==
- Botswana Police College
- Botswana
