= Nanda Soobben =

South African artist

- Born: Durban, Natal (now KwaZulu-Natal), South Africa
- Education: ML Sultan Technikon; San Francisco Art Institute, Parsons School of Design
- Years active: 1970s–present
- Known for: Political cartooning; Animation; Fine art; Public murals
- Notable work: The Wizard of HOD; Witness to a Decade (2004); Shut Your Pothole! (2015); ABH Peace Mural (2022)
- Movement: Anti-apartheid art, political satire

Nanda Soobben is a South African political cartoonist, fine artist, animator, visual activist and author. His works critique institutionalised racial segregation and civil rights abuses. Soobben's work has been featured in The Post Newspaper, The Independent, The Daily News, and the Sunday Tribune. He is the founder of the Centre of Fine Art, Animation and Design (CFAD) in Durban. His work spans over 40 years. Since 1980, Soobben's work has been featured in 13 exhibitions across North and South America, India and South Africa.

== Early life and education ==
Soobben was born and raised in Durban, KwaZulu-Natal, South Africa. He became interested in drawing from a young age and attended Mobeni Primary School. He graduated with a Diploma in Graphic design from ML Sultan Technical College, studied animation at the Parsons School of Design in New York City and completed an internship at the San Francisco School of Visual Art.

== Career ==
Soobben's first big break came from the POST, when he was requested to submit his cartoons to the editor. He worked as a sign writer for Coca Cola. He was not making money through his cartoons; he submitted his cartoons to newspaper "for the sake of the Struggle". During the apartheid era, he used political cartooning as a medium of creative resistance against racial segregation and institutional injustice. In the 1980s, he held an exhibition called the "Cato Manor – People Were Living There!" which was about forced removals the Group Areas Act The exhibition was opened by Ann Paton, Alan Paton was supposed to open it but died two weeks before the exhibition.

in 1988, Soobben travelled to Rio, Brazil, to visit his aunt, Savithree Reddy, who was a journalist. He had an exhibition in Rio. In 1989, he travelled back to South Africa. In 1989, he authored Wizard of HOD (House of Delegates), Witness to a Decade in 2004 and Shut Your Pothole in 2025. In 1994, Soobben founded The Centre for Fine Art Animation and Design (CFAD) to train disadvantaged South African artists in art, design, and animation.

In 2012, he was honoured with doctorate by the Durban University of Technology. In 2022, he won best director award for his television mini-series Nelson Mandela's Favourite African Folktales Episode 1 Fesito Goes To Market.

== Awards and honours ==
- 2007: United States Congressional Award – Outstanding Achievement
- Amnesty International Award
- Certificate of Honour – City of San Francisco
- 2009: The Heritage Award
- Vodacom Journalist of the Year (KZN) – Cartoonist Category
- 2012: Honorary Doctorate – Durban University of Technology
- 2022: Best Director – Crownwood International Film Festival (CWIFF)

== Personal life ==
Soobben is married to senior journalist lecturer at Durban University of Technology, Deseni Moodliar Soobben. They have two children.
