= St. Nicholas Hospital, Lagos =

St. Nicholas Hospital
- St. Nicholas Hospital LTD
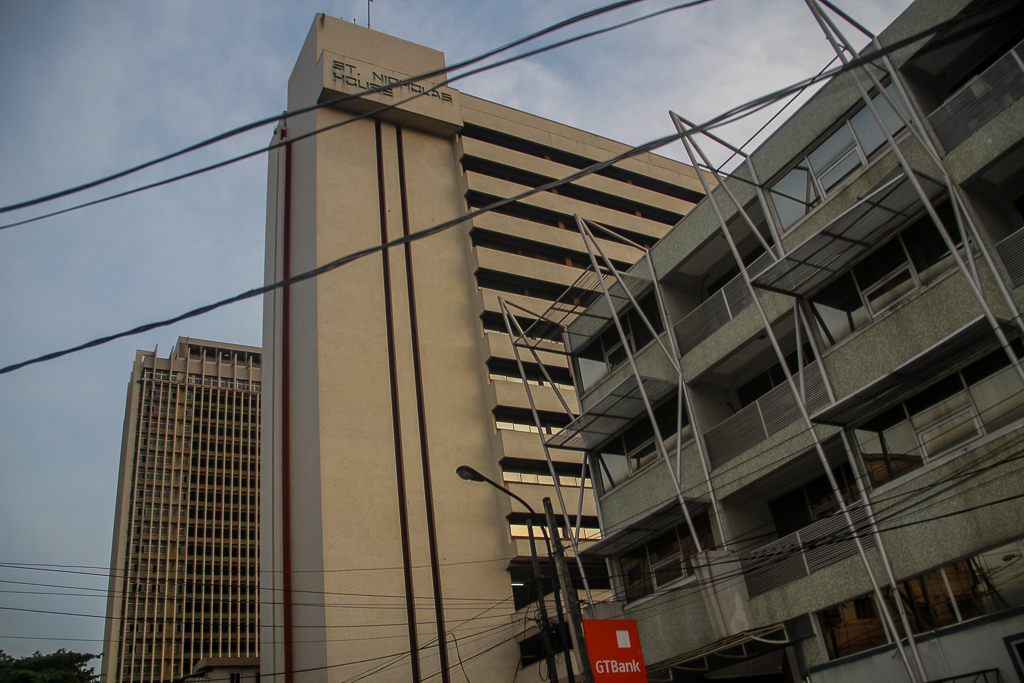

Geography
- Location: Lagos Island, Lagos, Lagos State, Nigeria
- Coordinates: 4°48′2″N 6°59′55″E 7B, Etim Inyang Street, beside Chocolate Royal, Victoria Island. St. Nicholas Hospital Clinics, Lekki Free trade zone. St Nicholas Hospital, Maryland

Organisation
- Care system: Private

Services
- Emergency department: Yes

Helipads
- Helipad: Yes

History
- Founded: 1968

Links
- Website: www.saintnicholashospital.com
- Lists: Hospitals in Nigeria
- Other links: List of hospitals in Lagos

St. Nicholas Hospital is a private hospital located in Lagos Island in Lagos, Nigeria. It was founded in 1968 by Moses Majekodunmi. The hospital is in a building of the same name located at 57 Campbell Street near Catholic Mission Street. It has other facilities at different locations in Nigeria. Their other locations are: St. Nicholas Hospital, Maryland, St. Nicholas Clinics, Lekki Free Trade Zone, St. Nicholas Clinics, 7b Etim Inyang Street, Victoria Island.

== Description ==
The hospital's 14-storey mixed-use high-rise building (St. Nicholas house) was designed by FMA Architects Ltd. The building's users includes several companies' offices with modern amenities and multilevel parking. The building is adjacent to King's College Lagos, Holy Cross Cathedral, Lagos and Lagos City Hall. The hospital spans five floors of the building with an outpatient clinic and emergency services on the ground floor.

== Milestones ==
St. Nicholas hospital has become a leading organ transplant centre in Nigeria, performing the first renal transplantation treatment, the first kidney transplant in Nigeria and the first paediatric kidney transplant in West Africa.

== Services ==
- Nephrology
- Medical and Emergency
- Intensive Care
- Preventive Health Screen
- Colonoscopy and Endoscopy
- General Medicine
- Nursing care
- Cardiology
- Paediatrics
- Antenatal Care
- Diagnostic Imaging
- Clinical Laboratory
- Surgery
- Radiology
- Family Medicine
- Physiotherapy
- Obstetrics and Gynaecology
- Oncology
- Nutrition and dietetics
- Dermatology
- Dialysis
- Pharmacy
- Health Assessment

== Fire incident ==
On 3 February 2014, 9:00 a.m. WST – At approximately 5:55 p.m. on Sunday, 2 February 2014, there was a fire on the 9th floor of the building. Urgent action was taken to extinguish the fire, the cause of which was believed to be an electrical problem.

== See also ==
- List of hospitals in Lagos
