= Durban University of Technology =

University in KwaZulu-Natal, South Africa

Coordinates: 29°51′05″S 31°0′26″E

- Inyuvesi yasethekwini yezobuchwepheshe
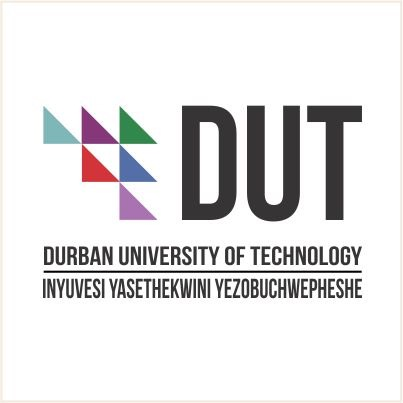
- Other name: DUT
- Motto: Creative. Distinctive. Impactful.
- Type: Public University of Technology
- Established: 2004; 22 years ago (history can be traced to 1907 as the former Natal Technical College)
- Academic affiliations: AAU, ACU, HESA, International Association of Universities
- Chancellor: Nonkululeko Nyembezi
- Vice-Chancellor: Thandwa Mthembu
- Administrative staff: 2 347
- Students: 31 991 students
- Location: Durban & Pietermaritzburg, KwaZulu-Natal, South Africa
- Colours: Baby blue, purple, green, red, royal blue & light purple
- Website: dut.ac.za

The Durban University of Technology (DUT) is a multi-campus university situated in KwaZulu-Natal, South Africa. It was formed in 2002 following the merger of Technikon Natal and ML Sultan Technikon and it was initially known as the Durban Institute of Technology. It has five campuses in Durban, and another two in Pietermaritzburg. In 2022, approximately 31 991 students were enrolled to study at DUT. The university is one of five technical institutions on the African continent to offer Doctoral Degrees.

== History ==
The Durban University of Technology is a result of the merger, in April 2002, of two technikons, ML Sultan and Technikon Natal. It was named the Durban Institute of Technology and later became the Durban University of Technology in 2004.

KwaZulu-Natal's Indian population began arriving in the 1860s to primarily work as indentured labourers on the sugar plantations. In 1927, those with no formal educational qualifications were threatened with repatriation. This threat stimulated adult classes in literacy, as well as a range of commercial subjects, held in a mission school and a Hindu Institute, but it was not until after the Second World War, and thanks to substantial financial support from the public, that ML Sultan College came into being. It would be another decade, however, before the City Council, now preoccupied with the structures of the first Group Areas Act of 1950, allocated suitable land for a permanent campus.

The Natal Technical College was founded in 1907 and immediately began providing tuition to more than 350 part-time students. The structures of apartheid as it was codified through legislation weighed heavily on this institution as well. In 1955 the college was taken over by national education authorities; and in 1967 it became an exclusively white institution.

== DUT Council ==
- Wiseman Madinane is the Chairperson of the University Council.
- Brenda Ntombela is the Deputy Chairperson of the University Council.

The DUT student body elects a Student Representative Council every 1-3 years.

== DUT Campuses ==
- Brickfield Campus, Durban
- City Campus, Durban
- Indumiso Campus, Pietermaritzburg
- ML Sultan Campus, Durban
- Ritson Campus, Durban
- Riverside Campus, Pietermaritzburg
- Steve Biko Campus, Durban

== Leadership & Operations ==
The university employs 841 academic staff, 51 percent of them female and 48 percent holding masters and 43 percent doctoral degrees.

Some of the senior members of the leadership team include:

- Thandwa Mthembu, Vice-Chancellor and Principal
- Vusi Gumede, Deputy Vice-Chancellor: Teaching & Learning
- David Mohale, Interim Deputy-Vice Chancellor: People & Operations
- Fulufhelo Nemavhola, Deputy Vice-Chancellor: Research, Innovation & Engagement
- Maditsane Nkonoane, Registrar
- Siboniso Shabalala, Chief Financial Officer

The six faculties include:

- Faculty of Accounting & Informatics
- Faculty of Applied Sciences
- Faculty of Arts & Design
- Faculty of Engineering & the Built Environment
- Faculty of Health Sciences
- Faculty of Management Sciences

Each Faculty is led by an Executive Dean. The academic ambit of DUT resides under the Deputy Vice-Chancellor: Teaching & Learning.

=== DUT Business School ===
The Durban University of Technology launched the DUT Business School in 2022. The Business School offers its new Masters of Business Administration (MBA) programme, Postgraduate Diploma in Business Administration (PDBA) programmes, Higher Certificate programmes and a variety of Executive Education and short learning programmes.

The DUT Business School also designs tailor-made, in-house programmes and collaborates with corporate, public and non-profit organisations to develop and capacitate employees in various areas.

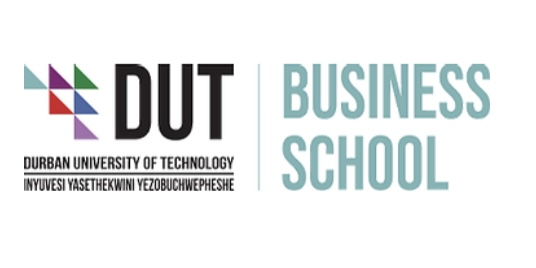

=== Student enrolment ===
Whilst the Durban University of Technology offers contact learning, DUT is also a member of COIL, which is the Collaborative Online International Learning consortium.

DUT has over 34000 registered students.This includes under-graduates, Masters and Doctoral/PhD candidates.

Student Enrollment at Durban University of Technology by Ethnic Group
Year	African / Black	Indian	White	Coloured	Other	Total
2018	85%	12%	2%	1%	–	100%
2024	93,48%	4,73%	0,57%	0,80%	0,42%	100%

== Rankings ==
University rankings

Global – Overall
- THE World: 401-500 (2021)

In 2021, the university was ranked by the Times Higher Education World University Rankings for the first time in its history. It ranked within the top 500 universities in the world, and within the top 5 in South Africa. It was also the first time in history that the province had two universities rank within the top 5 in the country. In 2022/3, DUT remained in the Top 5 of all 26 South African Universities, was the number 1 University of Technology in the country and in the top one third globally.

DUT Times Higher Education Ranking 2016 to 2024
Year	World Rank
2024	1001–1200
2023	501–600
2022	401–500
2021	401–500

== Notable alumni ==
The university has a large alumni body. Mr Alan Khan was the first President of the DUT Convocation in 2002. Miss Zama Mncube is the current President of the Convocation and Chairperson of the Convocation Executive. The elected Presidents of the DUT Convocation, in chronological order are:

- Mr Alan Khan (2002)
- Mr Zakhele Nyuswa (2004)
- Ms Maud Mogodi-Dikgetsi (2008)
- Mr Wiseman Madinane (2011)
- Mr Siyabonga Vezi (2018)
- Ms Zama Mncube (2022)

The university has a list of famous alumni, including:

- Gordon Murray - Engineer and designer, McLaren Automotive and Gordon Murray Automotive
- Jeremy Maggs - TV news presenter
- Alan Khan - Radio and TV presenter
- Lance Klusener - Cricketer
- Nthati Moshesh - Actress
- Nanda Soobben - Artist
- Celeste Ntuli - Comedian and actress
- Black Coffee (DJ) - DJ, record producer, singer and songwriter
- Zakes Bantwini - Multi-award-winning singer, record producer and businessman
- Sarah Richards - Sculptor
- Schabir Shaik - Businessman
- Bongiwe Msomi - South Africa national netball team player
- Candice Forword - Field hockey forward for the South Africa women's national field hockey team
- Billy Nair - Politician, a member of the National Assembly of South Africa, an Anti-Apartheid Movement activist and a political prisoner in Robben Island.
- Berry Bickle - Artist
- Gabisile Nkosi - Artist and activist
- Zwakele Mncwango - Politician, Provincial Leader of KwaZulu-Natal Democratic Alliance (South Africa) (DA)
- Babalo Madikizela - Politician, Eastern Cape MEC for Public Works since May 2019 and a Member of the Eastern Cape Provincial Legislature since November 2018, provincial treasurer of the African National Congress (ANC) since October 2017.
- Mandisa Mashego - Politician, A member of the Economic Freedom Fighters, party's provincial chairperson in Gauteng from 2018 to 2020, Member of the Gauteng Provincial Legislature from 2014 to 2020.
- Nobuhle Nkabane - Politician, Minister of Higher Education and Training, South Africa.

== Honorary Doctorates ==
- Mrs P Naidoo, April 2008
- Professor E J da Silva (posthumous), April 2008
- Mr Andrew Verster, April 2009
- Dr M Hinoul, April 2009
- Mr J N Kollapen, April 2009
- Mr N Soobben, April 2010
- Dr Imtiaz Sooliman, September 2010
- Mr Gordon Murray, April 2011
- Mr B S Biko (posthumous), April 2011
- Mr M L Sultan (posthumous), April 2011
- Mr R H L Strachan, April 2011
- Professor L Nkosi (posthumous), April 2012
- Ms W Y N Luhabe, April 2012
- Vice-Admiral J R Mudimu, April 2012
- Professor N S Ndebele, April 2012
- Mr S Nxasana, September 2012
- Ms Ela Gandhi, September 2012
- Mr Brand Pretorius, April 2013
- Mr Jay Naidoo, September 2013
- Mrs L G Ngcobo, April 2014
- Mr Sven Peek, April 2014
- Mr Ronnie Govender, April 2014
- Mr Anant Singh, September 2014
- Mr D D B Mkhwanazi, September 2014
- Mr Joseph Shabalala, April 2015
- Mr Richard Maponya, April 2015
- Mr Desmond D’Sa, September 2015
- Mr Ahmed Kathrada, April 2016
- Mrs G T Serobe, September 2016
- Mr Kumi Naidoo, September 2017
- Judge Navanethem Pillay, September 2017
- Dr A M Mlangeni, April 2018
- Ms E N Mahlangu, September 2018
- Mr J Clegg, September 2018
- Mr S Mchunu, September 2018
- Mr W Nzimande, September 2018
- Mr B P Vundla, September 2019
- Professor Z K G Mda, June 2021
- Ms Thembi Mtshali-Jones, July 2022
- Professor Salim Abdool Karim, May 2023
- Ms Gcina Mhlophe, May 2024
- Mr Sipho Nkosi, September 2025
