= Moses Majekodunmi =

Nigerian obstetrician and gynaecologist

Chief Moses Adekoyejo Majekodunmi

Minister of Health
- In office 1960–1966

Administrator of Western Region
- In office 29 June 1962 – December 1962
- Preceded by: Samuel Akintola
- Succeeded by: Samuel Akintola

Personal details
- Born: 17 August 1916 Abeokuta, Nigeria
- Died: 11 April 2012 (aged 95)

Chief Moses Adekoyejo Majekodunmi (Yoruba: Adékóyèjọ Májẹ̀kódùnmí,; 17 August 1916 – 11 April 2012) was a Nigerian gynaecologist and obstetrician. He was Minister of Health in the Nigerian First Republic.

As an Oloye of the Yoruba people, he held the chieftaincy titles of the Mayegun of Lagos and the Otun Balogun of the Christians of Egbaland.

== Early life and education ==
Majekodunmi was born in Abeokuta in August 1916. He studied at Abeokuta Grammar School, St. Gregory's College, Lagos, before proceeding to Trinity College Dublin where he earned a degree in Anatomy and Physiology in 1936. He also earned a 1st Class degree in Bacteriology and Clinical Medicine in 1940.

== Medical career ==
In Ireland, he worked as an in-house physician at the National Children's Hospital and the Rotunda Hospital from 1941 to 1942. In 1943, he joined the Federal Government Medical Services as a medical doctor and established his medical practice. He played key roles in the establishment of the Lagos University Teaching Hospital and also founded Saint Nicholas Hospital in Lagos, which opened in March 1968.

== Political career ==
He was elected into the Nigerian Senate in 1960. He was appointed sole administrator of the Western Region in June 1962 after a political crisis in the region, holding office in place of Premier Samuel Akintola until December of that year.

The crisis was due to a struggle between Akintola and the former Western Region Premier and current leader of the opposition Obafemi Awolowo, which had led to violent scenes in the House of Assembly. On advice from the police, one of his first acts was to sign restriction orders to detain leaders of both factions. After the situation had stabilized, Akintola resumed office on 1 January 1963.

== Noted relatives ==
Olufemi Majekodunmi

Desmond Majekodunmi

== Bibliography ==
- Moses Adekoyejo Majekodunmi (1998). My lord what a morning: autobiography of Moses Adekoyejo Majekodunmi. Macmillan. ISBN 978-018-213-6.

Region	Period	Governor	Premier	Notes
Eastern Region	Oct 1960 - Jan 1966	Francis Akanu Ibiam	Michael Okpara	
Mid-Western Region	Aug 1963 - Feb 1964	Dennis Osadebay	Dennis Osadebay (Administrator)	Region created from part of Western Region on 8 August 1963
Mid-Western Region	Feb 1964 - Jan 1966	Jereton Mariere	Dennis Osadebay	
Northern Region	Oct 1960 - 1962	Gawain Westray Bell	Ahmadu Bello	
Northern Region	1962 - Jan 1966	Kashim Ibrahim	Ahmadu Bello	
Western Region	Oct 1960 - May 1962	Adesoji Aderemi	Samuel Ladoke Akintola	
Western Region	May 1962 - Dec 1962	Adesoji Aderemi	Moses Majekodunmi (Administrator)	Administrator appointed during political crisis
Western Region	Jan 1963 - Jan 1966	Joseph Fadahunsi	Samuel Akintola	
