= FMA Architects =

Nigerian international architecture, planning and interior design firm

FMA Architects Ltd

Practice information
- Key architects: Olufemi Majekodunmi, Femi Agboola, Deji Majekodunmi, Lateef Balogun and Chukwudi Osakwe
- Founded: 1973
- Location: Lagos, Nigeria

Significant works and honors
- Buildings: Botswana Police College; St. Nicholas Hospital, Lagos; Protea Hotel, Victoria Island; South African High commission Total Head Office, Lagos; NAL Office Buildings

FMA Architects Ltd is an international architecture, planning and interior design firm headquartered in Lagos, Nigeria.

== History ==
Olufemi Majekodunmi established FMA Architects Ltd in 1973 as Femi Majekodunmi Associates. The firm is one of the foremost architectural firms in Nigeria. It was initially located at Odunlami Street before moving to St Nicholas Building, Lagos Island. Since then, it has expanded and grown its services most especially in Nigeria. The firm has diversified into various forms of architecture, design and construction in projects with the Nigerian government and corporate institutions. The firm currently maintains offices in the cities of Lagos, Nigeria, Abuja in Nigeria, Pretoria in South Africa and Gaborone in Botswana.

== Completed projects ==
- St. Nicholas Hospital, Lagos Lagos Island
- Botswana Police College, Otse
- Bank PHB Head Office Building, Victoria Island, Lagos
- Sterling Towers, Lagos
- Total Head Office, Victoria Island, Lagos
- Renaissance Capital Office, Victoria Island, Lagos
- South African High Commission, Abuja
- IBRU Building Apapa, Lagos
- Protea Hotel, Victoria Island, Lagos
- NAL Towers, Marina, Lagos
- Federal Ministry of Finance, Abuja
- LandMark Office development for Great Brands, Lagos
- Wheatbaker Hotel, Ikoyi, Lagos
- GZ Factory, Lagos
- ICC Office Park Garborone, Botswana
- Chevron Texaco, Nigeria Ltd
- Standard Chartered Bank Building, Victoria Island, Lagos
- MTN Switch Center, Data centre, Ojota, Lagos
- MTN Switch & Call Center, Asaba, Delta State.
- MTN Switch Centre, Enugu
- Mixed Use Development in Lekki, Lagos
- Residential Developments at Adiva Plain Fields, Lekki-Epe, Lagos
- Residential Development at FBN Mortgages, Abuja
- Residential Developments, Banana Island, Ikoyi Island, Lagos
- Luxury Condominiums, twin Lake Estates, Lekki, Lagos
- UPDC Estates, Lekki, Lagos
- Christ the Cornerstone International School, Ogun State, Nigeria
- Esowofina Limited, Victoria Island, Lagos
- Nicon Town Estates, Lekki Masterplan
- Summerville Golf Estate Planning, Lekki, Lagos
- All Souls Church, Lekki, Lagos
- Our Saviours Church, Tafawa Balewa Square, Lagos
