= ML Sultan Technikon =

- Type: Public University of Technology
- Established: 1946
- Location: Durban, Kwa-Zulu Natal, South Africa

ML Sultan is located in Durban, KwaZulu-Natal, South Africa and has now merged with Technikon Natal to form the Durban University of Technology.

== History ==
The institution was named after Mohammed Lappa Sultan who donated funds in 1941 to establish a technical college in Durban, KwaZulu-Natal (KZN). This institute provided educational opportunities to “non-white” people that had previously not been available in the region. In 1946, the Minister declared the ML Sultan Technical College an approved institution for Higher Education, in terms of the Higher Education act of 1923. On August 7, 1956, the ML Sultan Technical College was officially opened. In May 1979, the status of the college was changed to that of a Technikon. In April 2002, ML Sultan merged with Technikon Natal to form the Durban Institute of Technology which in 2004, was renamed the Durban University of Technology.
