= International Law Enforcement Academy =

Program administered by the U.S. Department of State to train foreign law enforcement

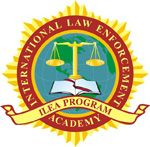
International Law Enforcement Academies Program Logo

International Law Enforcement Academies (ILEAs) are international police academies administered by the United States Department of State where United States law enforcement can instruct local police from participating countries in counterterrorism, narcotics interdiction, detection of fraudulent documents, and border control practices. They were established in 1995 by United States president Bill Clinton as a means of bringing together international law enforcement to reduce crime, combat terrorism, and share in knowledge and training.

Presently, there are four regional ILEAs located around the world: ILEA San Salvador in El Salvador, ILEA Budapest in Hungary, ILEA Bangkok in Thailand, and ILEA Gaborone in Botswana. A fifth facility, ILEA Roswell in New Mexico, United States, focuses on advanced leadership and the legal/policy frameworks necessary to facilitate effective law enforcement within the parameters of respecting civil and human rights of their citizens. Additionally, there is an affiliated Regional Training Center in Accra, Ghana.

Thirteen federal law enforcement agencies participate in the ILEA program, and select metropolitan police departments are sourced for their areas of expertise. Participating agencies include DSS, DEA, ATF, FBI, ICE, FLETC, DOI, IRS-CI, among others.

Instructors and active agents teach courses on subjects such as physical security for installations, transnational investigations, post-blast investigations, countering wildlife trafficking, anticorruption, illicit drug trafficking, money laundering and financial crimes, terrorism and human trafficking. The ILEA provides a core curriculum of management and technical instruction for criminal justice managers to develop effective law enforcement cooperation while enhancing each country's criminal justice institutions abilities to suppress transnational crime.

The bilateral agreements creating ILEA operations also establish a Joint Oversight Committee chaired by the U.S. Embassy and host government officials to oversee the policies and operation of the Academy. The Joint Committee meets at least twice a year and operates by consensus of the parties.
