= Desmond Majekodunmi =

Nigerian climate activist

Desmond Majekodumni
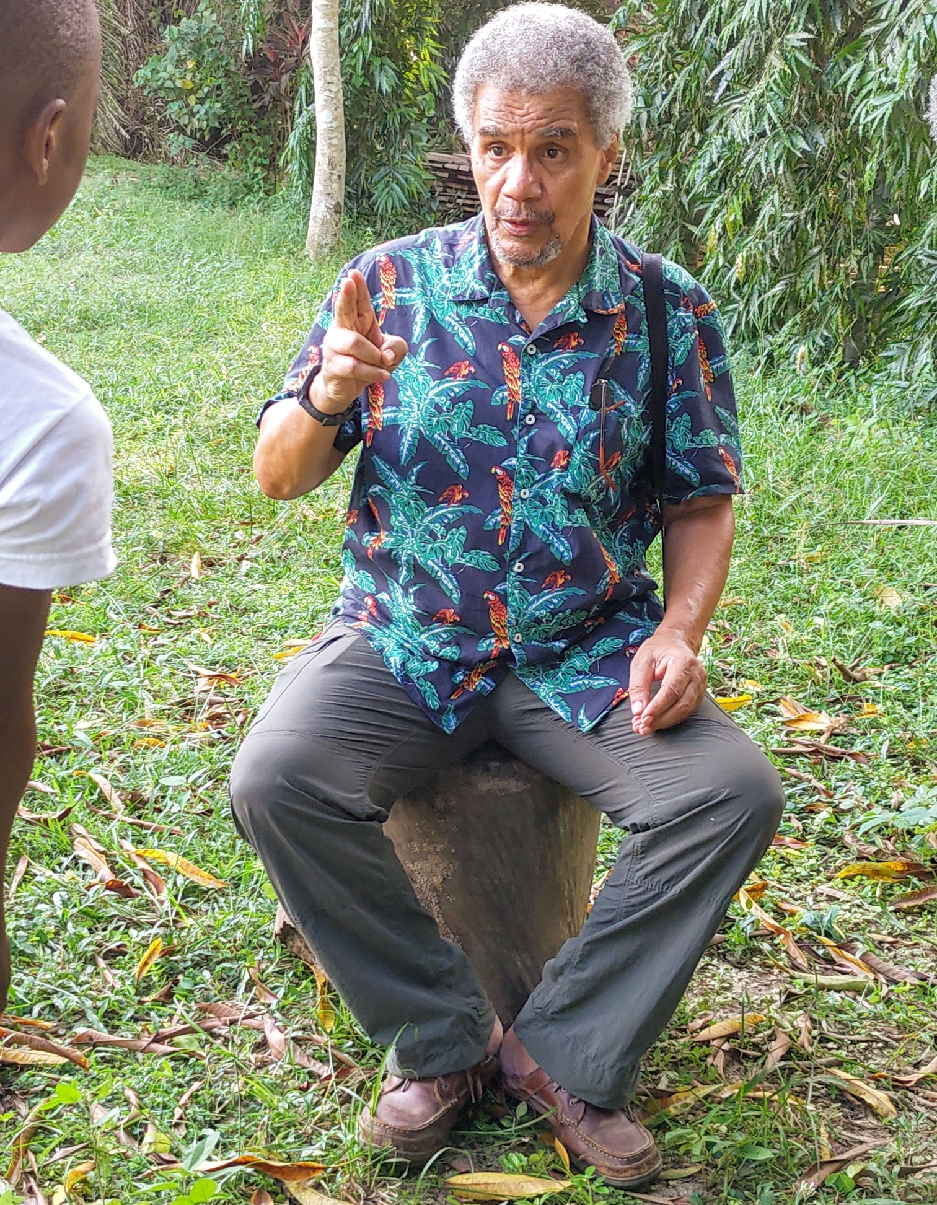
- Desmond in Lufasi Park, May 2021.
- Born: June 1950 (age 75–76); Lagos, Nigeria
- Other name: Olumuyiwa
- Education: International School, Ibadan; Corona Schools, Ikoyi; King's College, Lagos; Norwich City University, UK.
- Occupation: Conservationist
- Known for: Environmental and climate-change activism
- Notable work: LUFASI Park
- Awards: He has won the Nigerian Silverbird TV "Man of the Year"; He has won the Nigerian DW German TV network "Environment Hero"

Desmond Olumuyiwa Majekodunmi (born June 1950) is a Nigerian environmentalist. He is the chairman of the Lekki State Urban Forest and Animal Shelter Initiative (LUFASI), and a radio show host of the Green Hour on Nigeria Info 99.3 FM. Majekodunmi is also an author, a singer and script-writer. In addition to this, he works as a farmer, multi-media engineer/producer, Film Maker and musician.

He has received many awards in recognition of his work on agriculture and the environment. He has won the Nigerian Silverbird TV "Man of the Year" and DW German TV network "Environment Hero". His efforts to get more trees planted were acknowledged with an award from the Ministry of Environment. He is a certified experimental extension farmer for International Institute of Tropical Agriculture (IITA), Ibadan, and operates Majekodunmi Agricultural Project (MAP) – an agro forestry based conservation farm in Lagos. The only agro forestry based conservation farm in Nigeria's economic centre, a portion of which has been registered as an Urban Forest Park.

He describes the climatic changes, rain, storm, and hurricanes in the world as what experts have predicted and what we are now seeing it. In his words, it goes on and on and all we can do is support them.

He is the son of the First Republic federal minister, Chief Moses Majekodunmi, and his Irish wife – Nora Majekodunmi, the founder of Corona Schools.

He recently received an award from Paschal Dozie after giving a lecture on sustainable development and has received several other awards regarding climate change and environmental conservation.

Majekodunmi serves as the current chairman of the Awareness and Fund Raising committee of the Nigeria Conservation Foundation (NCF), Lagos, and is a conservation farming practitioner.

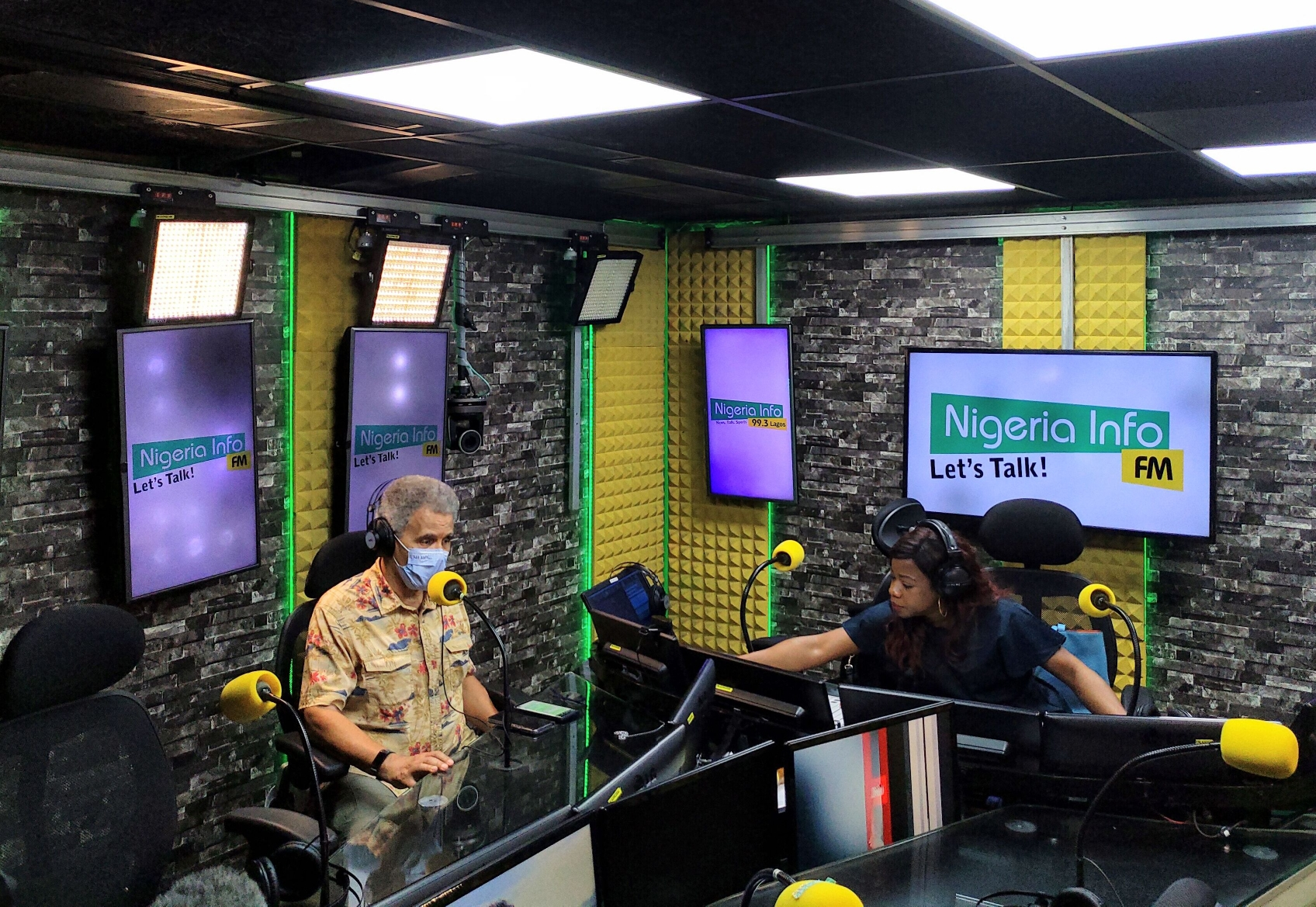
On air with Joyce of Nigeria Info 99.3 FM

== Career ==
Mr. Majekodunmi is the proprietor and operator of the Majekodunmi Agricultural Projects in Lagos, the only agroforestry-based conservation farm in Nigeria's economic hub, and a certified experimental extension farmer for the International Institute of Tropical Agriculture (IITA) Ibadan. A portion of the farm has been registered as an Urban Forest Park. He frequently gives lectures on ecosystem, conservation, and adaptation and mitigation of climate change. He also hosts the weekly radio show "Environment Report" on Nigeria Info 99.3 FM radio station. Through his business, Desco Tourism Developments, he advises various state governments on tourism development. He is also an author, screenwriter, singer, and documentary filmmaker. The German Green party just hired him to make a movie about climate change in Nigeria.

== Award ==
Desmond Majekodunmi is an environmental activist and multifaceted engineer who has won numerous honors for his tenacious efforts in the fields of agriculture and the environment.

- He was named both the DW German TV network's "Environment Hero" and the "Man of the Year" for Silverbird TV in Nigeria.
