= UTC Nigeria Plc =

Swiss conglomerate

Union Trading Company PLC commonly known as UTC PLC was a Swiss founded diversified conglomerate that was publicly listed on the Nigerian Stock Exchange. It was founded by Swiss traders that were affiliated with both Basel Trading Company and the Basel Mission and who wanted portions of their earnings to support the works of the mission. The traders already had business interest in India and Ghana prior to entering the Nigerian market. In Ghana, the group owned a thriving cocoa business before the beginning of World War I, years after the war, the group established its subsidiary in Nigeria in 1932.

In Nigeria, the firm grew through acquisitions and trading, establishing various divisions including Dorman Long Nigeria, UTC Foods, Almagamated Metal Containers, HF Schroeder and a motors division. It increased importation of merchandise into Nigeria after World War II, during Nigeria's oil boom, UTC's revenues rose from 150 million francs to about 1.5 billion francs.

But towards the end of the 1980s, UTC's profit began to slip.

== Business activities ==
UTC was established in Nigerian in 1932 and was formerly registered as a limited liability company in 1968, it sold shares to the public in 1971. A conglomerate, it had divisions in agriculture and engineering such as UTC Stores that was a chain of Supermarkets, UTC Motors, Dorman Long, Amalgamated Metal Containers, Imo Hills Ltd and UTC Industries. in 1994, the company divested the non food processing divisions to concentrate on its food processing business, marketing brands such as Chopsy, Bell and champ.

== Decline ==
Beginning in the 1970s, Basler Handelsgesellschaft, a private Basel based Swiss holding company that owned controlling shares in UTC Plc, began to diversify their interest away from West Africa. In Nigeria, UTC's profit margin began to dip in the 1980s. The firm diversified its engineering business in the 1990s to concentrate on food processing but by 2014 it was taken over by its creditors.

On May 2, 2017 the company was delisted from the Nigerian Stock Exchange.
