= List of Nigerian architects =

This is a list of Nigerian architects.

== Nigerian architects ==
- Dr. Lanre Towry-Coker
- Onafowokan Michael Olutusen
- Alex Ifeanyichukwu Ekwueme
- Olufemi Majekodunmi
- Suraj Abdurrahman
- Olajumoke Adenowo
- Kunlé Adeyemi
- Halima Tayo Alao
- Ibiyinka Alao
- David Aradeon
- Nnimmo Bassey
- Ibrahim Bunu
- Mohammed Daggash
- Fifi Ejindu
- Lara George
- Babban Gwani
- John Godwin and Gillian Hopwood
- Felix Ibru
- Tom Ikimi
- Darius Ishaku
- Ola-dele Kuku
- Demas Nwoko
- Samuel Oboh
- Tosin Oshinowo
- Vop Osili
- David Oyedepo
- William Barnabas Qurix
- Musa Mohammed Sada
- Namadi Sambo
