= Hausa architecture =

Architecture of Hausa people

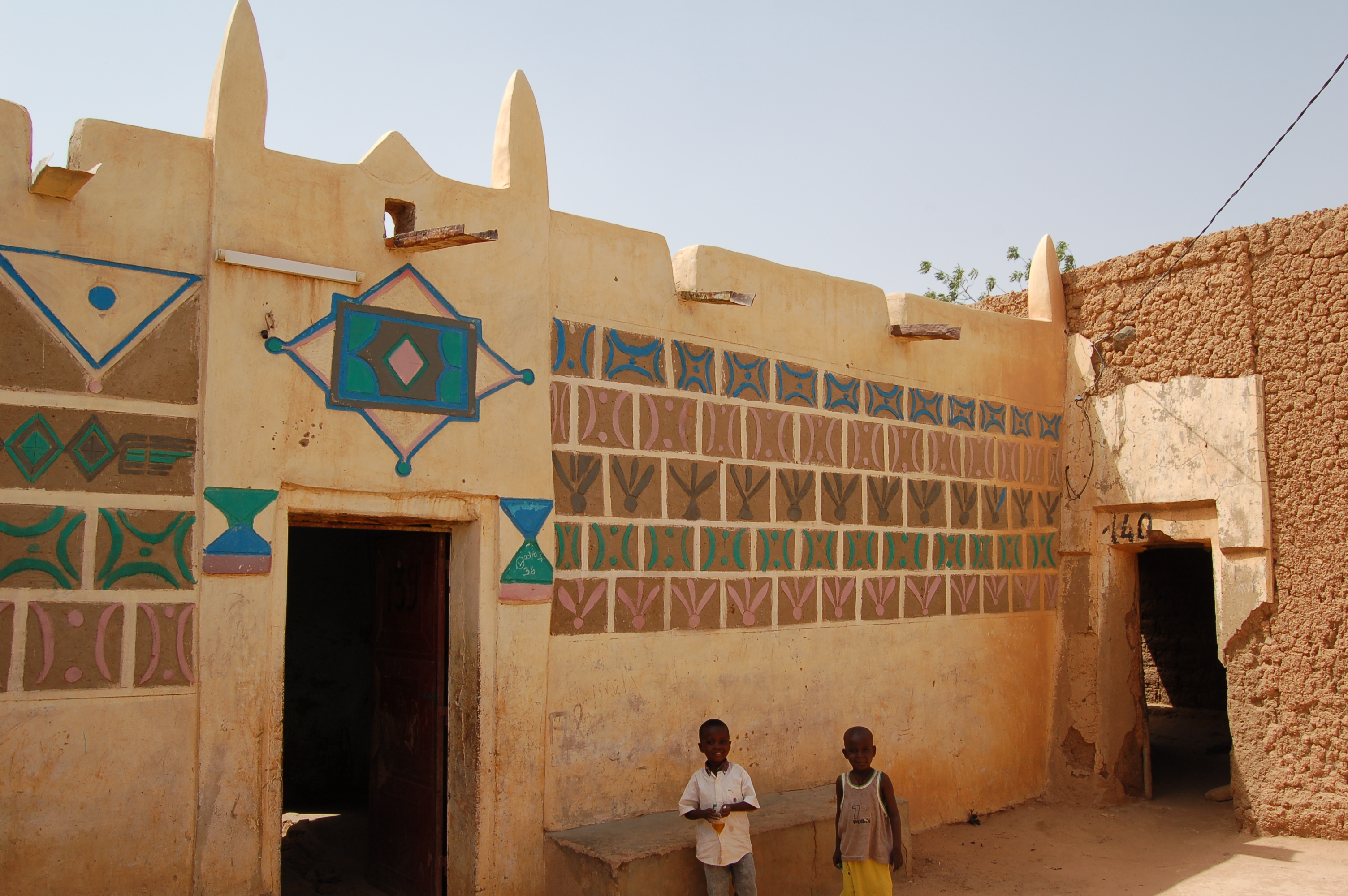
Hausa house in Zinder, Niger

Hausa architecture is the architecture of the Hausa people of Northern Nigeria and Niger. Hausa architectural forms include mosques, walls, common compounds, and gates. Hausa traditional architecture is an integral part of how Hausa people construct a sense of interrelatedness with their physical environment. The architectural program used in this society is one disciplined by Islam and results in a highly organized spatial structure which is used to express features of Hausa culture.

== Architecture ==
=== Building Types ===
Where Hausa Architecture differs from other architectural programs across the globe is its limited use of spaces for specialized activities. The main parts of a Hausa city are the defensive wall, the palace, mosques, the market, and domestic buildings. In Hausa buildings, there are three main elements: the primary room, the courtyard, and the wall. With these three components, many variations of buildings have been created for a multitude of uses.

==== Family Homes ====
In traditional Hausa family homes the muslim women usually follow Purdah meaning the rooms are designed around separating the sexes in the house. The houses are based around the or within the courtyard to uphold the standards of separation of sexes. When a couple is married part of their dowry is brass pots and pans and they are plastered into the inside of the earthly walls as decorations after they are consummated. Hausa architecture within a family home is typically based around a center of the home. The family owner is given the right to build his house onto his neighbors wall without permission from the said neighbor as long as there is no view point into the neighboring courtyard.

==== Domestic Architecture ====
It is common to see the traditional African pattern of rooms arranged around the courtyard in domestic buildings. The order of building operations follows closely to the pre-Islamic order with the perimeter wall being the most important.

==== The Hausa Palace ====
The decorated entrance gate of Palace of the Emir of Zaria

The Hausa Palace is essentially a larger version of the domestic buildings in Hausa Architecture. Palaces symbolized political power, community solidarity, and religious authority. Palaces are located at the city center, which predates Islamic influence.

==== Mosques ====
Mosques in Hausaland typically consist of one room whose Qibla wall is denoted by a mihrab. The roof may be made of mud, thatch, or – as of recently – tin. The roof may also be accessible for prayer use. There is a typical use of either reinforced columns and support beams or reinforced support arches to help keep the building in place. The decoration is not typically a notable feature of these mosques. Instead, the use of large sculptural forms creates the feeling inside the space, and decoration is used mainly to emphasize the mihrab area. It is usually placed inside a rectangular walled courtyard, with the corners of the building lining up with North, East, South, and West.

==== Construction ====
When first built, a Hausa building will have a crisp, clean, and efficient look that is a product of strict structural discipline. The organic forms for which Hausa Architecture is known results from the erosion process that comes with rain. Each dry season, the buildings are repaired to bring them back to that neat and clean look. The decorations on the front face of the buildings (façade) often represent prosperity and wealth. The traditional Hausa Architecture can be categorized into three various groups. They can consist of surface designs, ornamental, and calligraphy.

== Environment ==
=== Geology ===
The main portion of the Hausaland consists of pre-Cambrian rocks, but turn into tertiary sediments in the east. The sites of early settlements were often located around inselbergs due to the minerals in these rocks. A large portion of the Hausaland is covered in laterite, which is the most important building material used in Hausa Architecture.

=== Topography ===
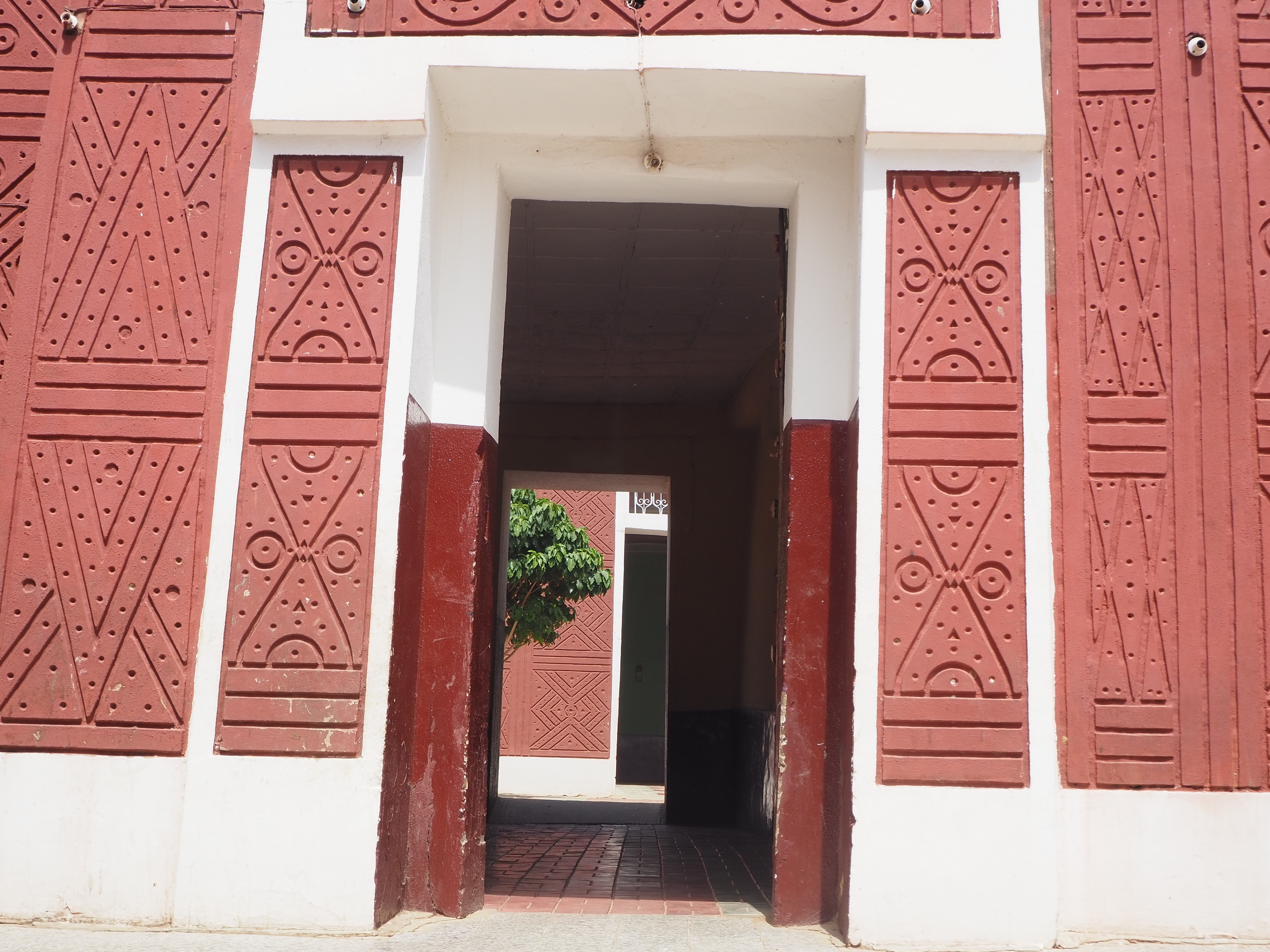

The topography of the Hausaland is suited for using horses for transportation. This has historically allowed for easy transportation of both people and products across the land.

=== Climate ===
The northern portion of the Hausaland has a semi-arid climate while the southern portion is closer to savanna.

== Tubali ==
Tubali is the Hausa architectural style predominant in Northern Nigeria, Niger, eastern Burkina Faso, northern Benin, as well as some West African countries. Tubali comes from the language of Hausa and when it refers to earlier buildings it often references bright colorful Mosques and palaces.

== Gallery ==
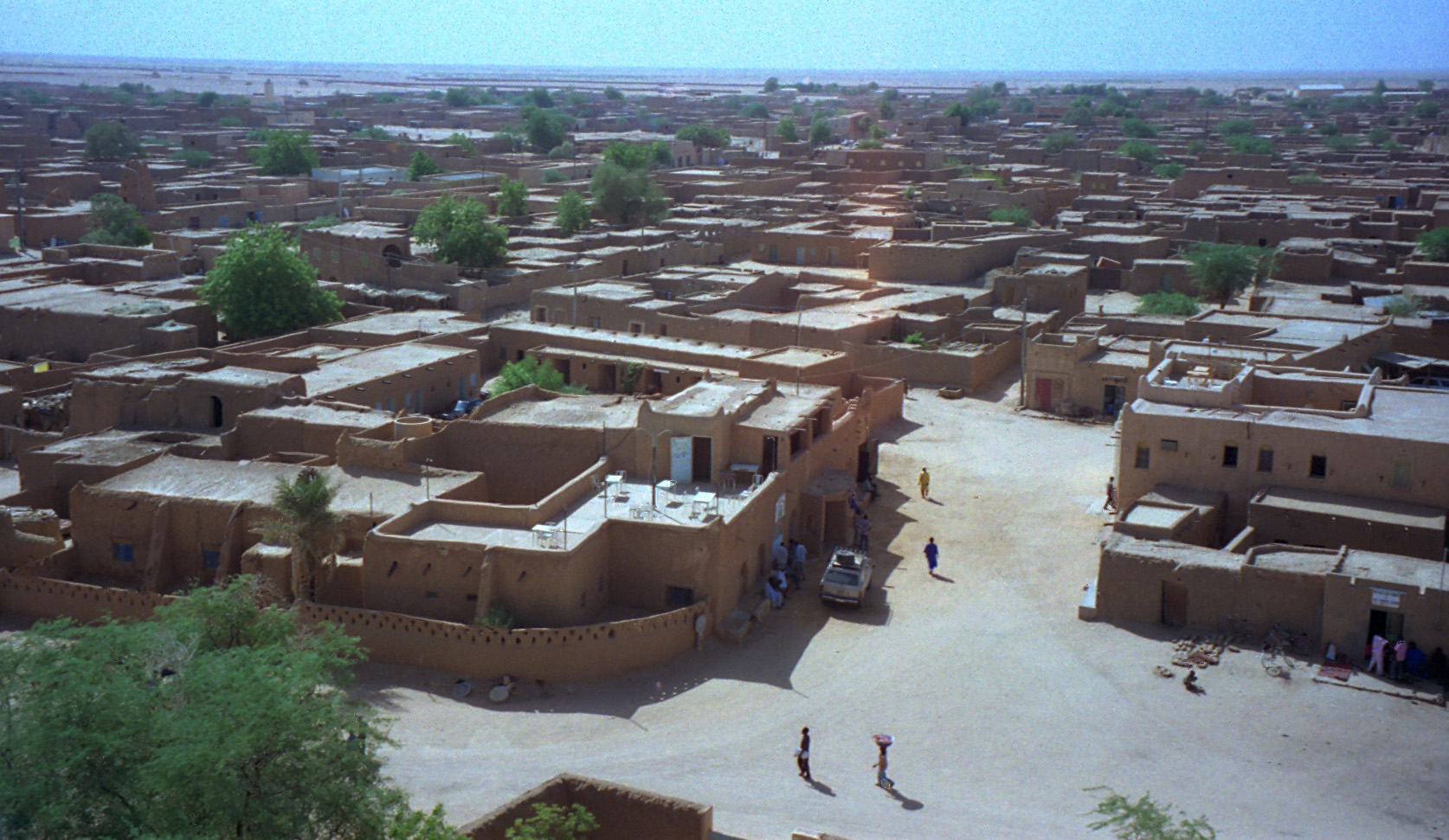
View of Agadez, a town in Niger

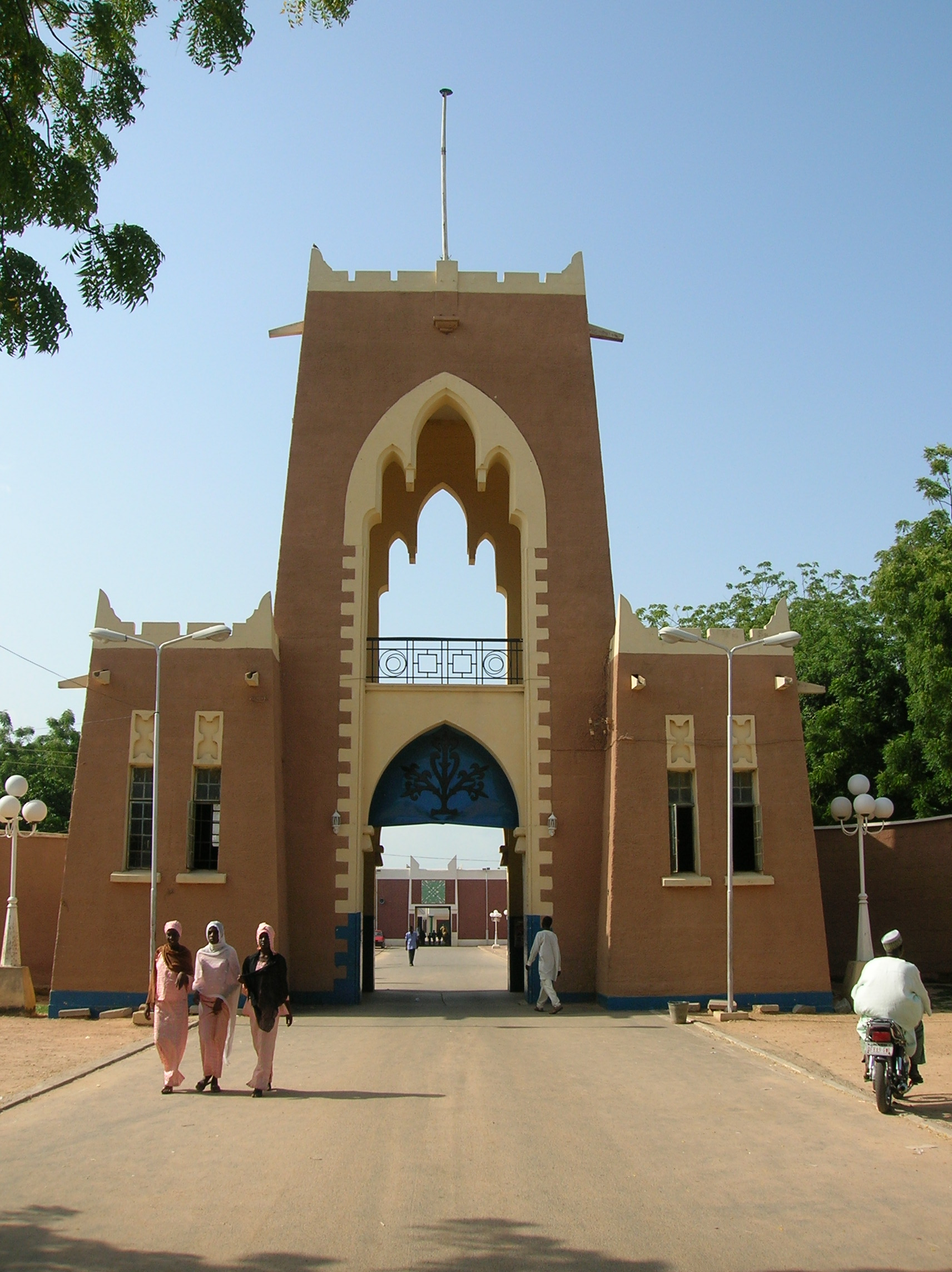
Gidan Rumfa in Kano

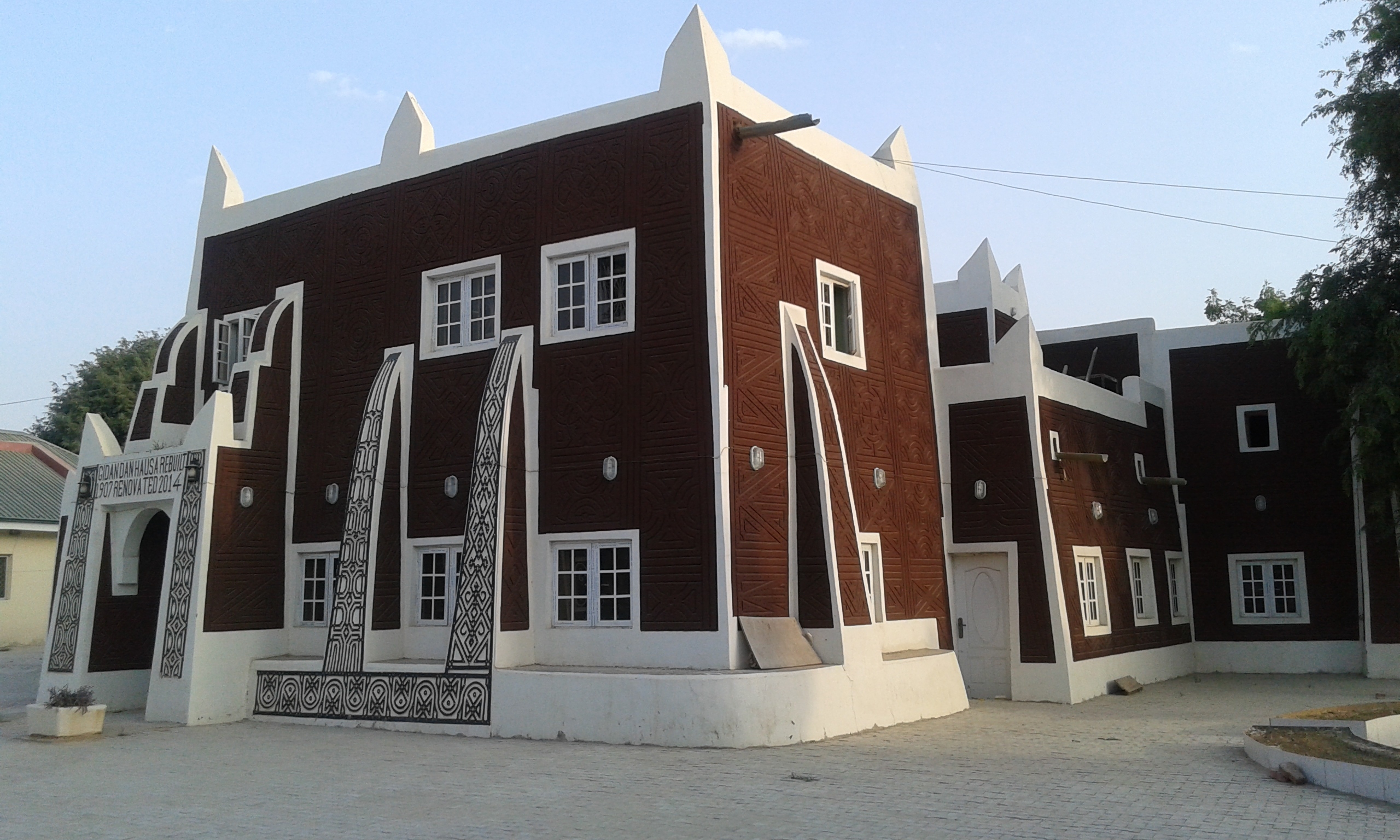
Kano Museum, an example of Hausa Tubali architecture

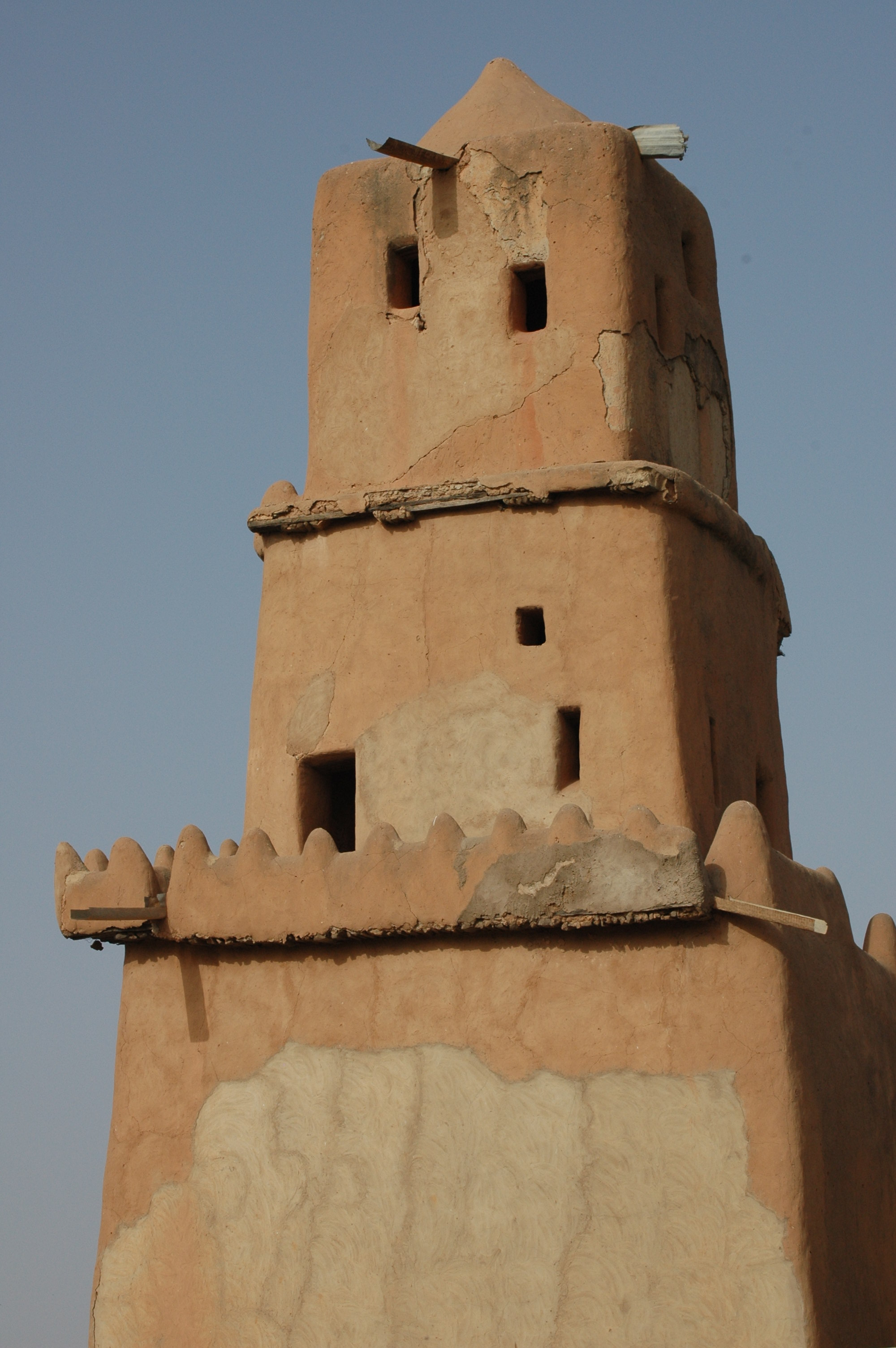
Gobarau Minaret in Katsina

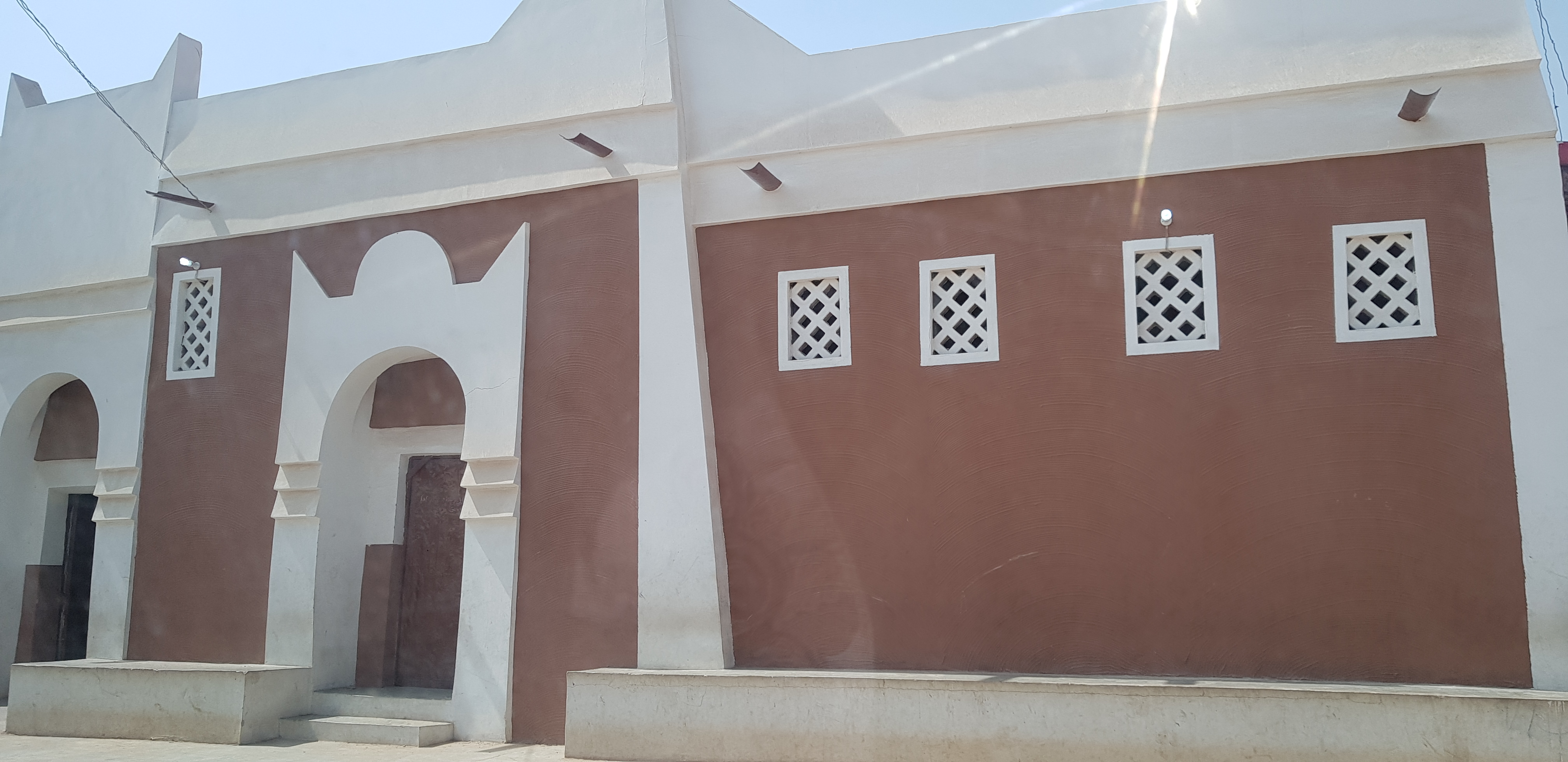
Hausa architectural painting and exterior design

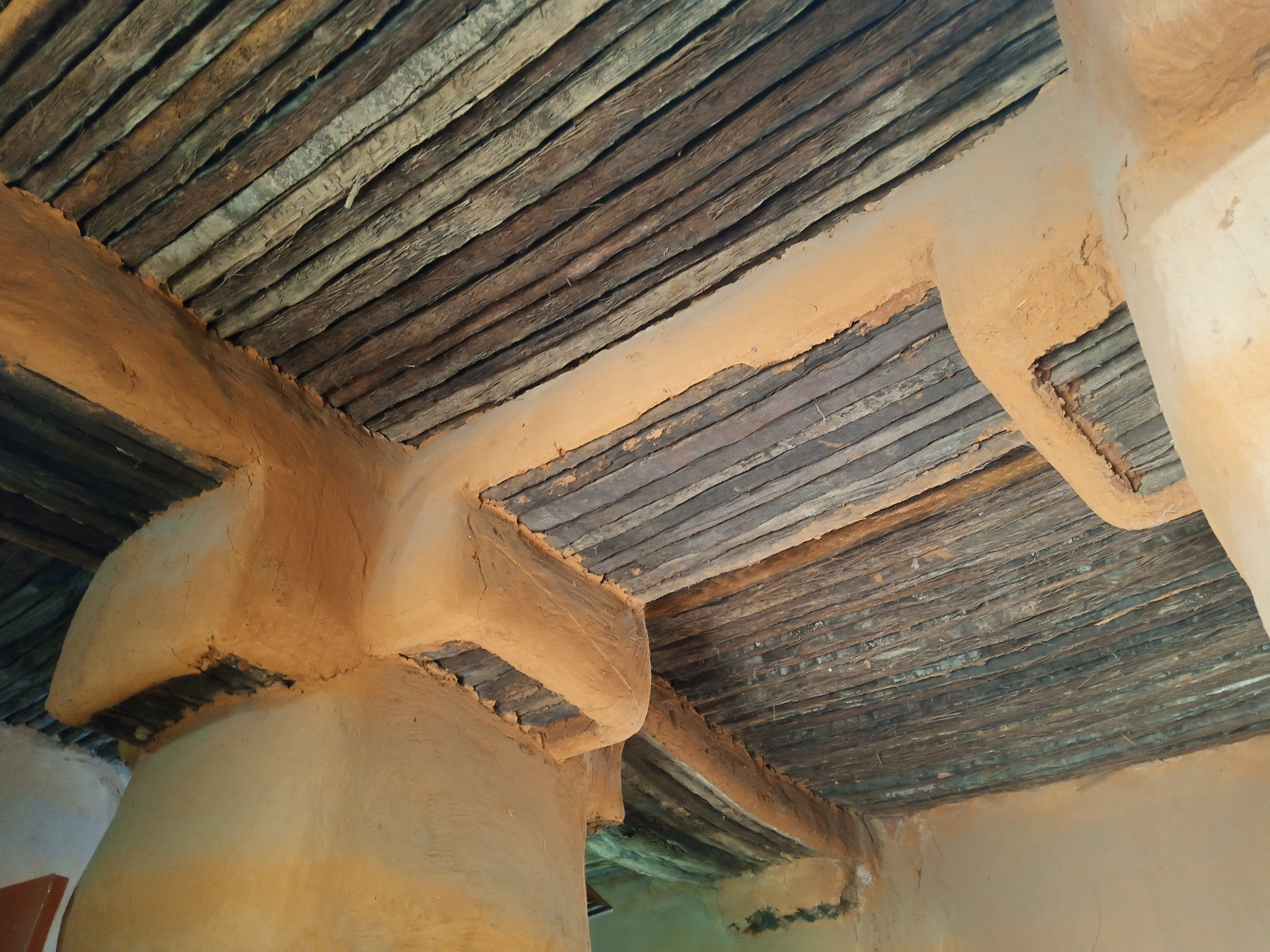
Roofing style

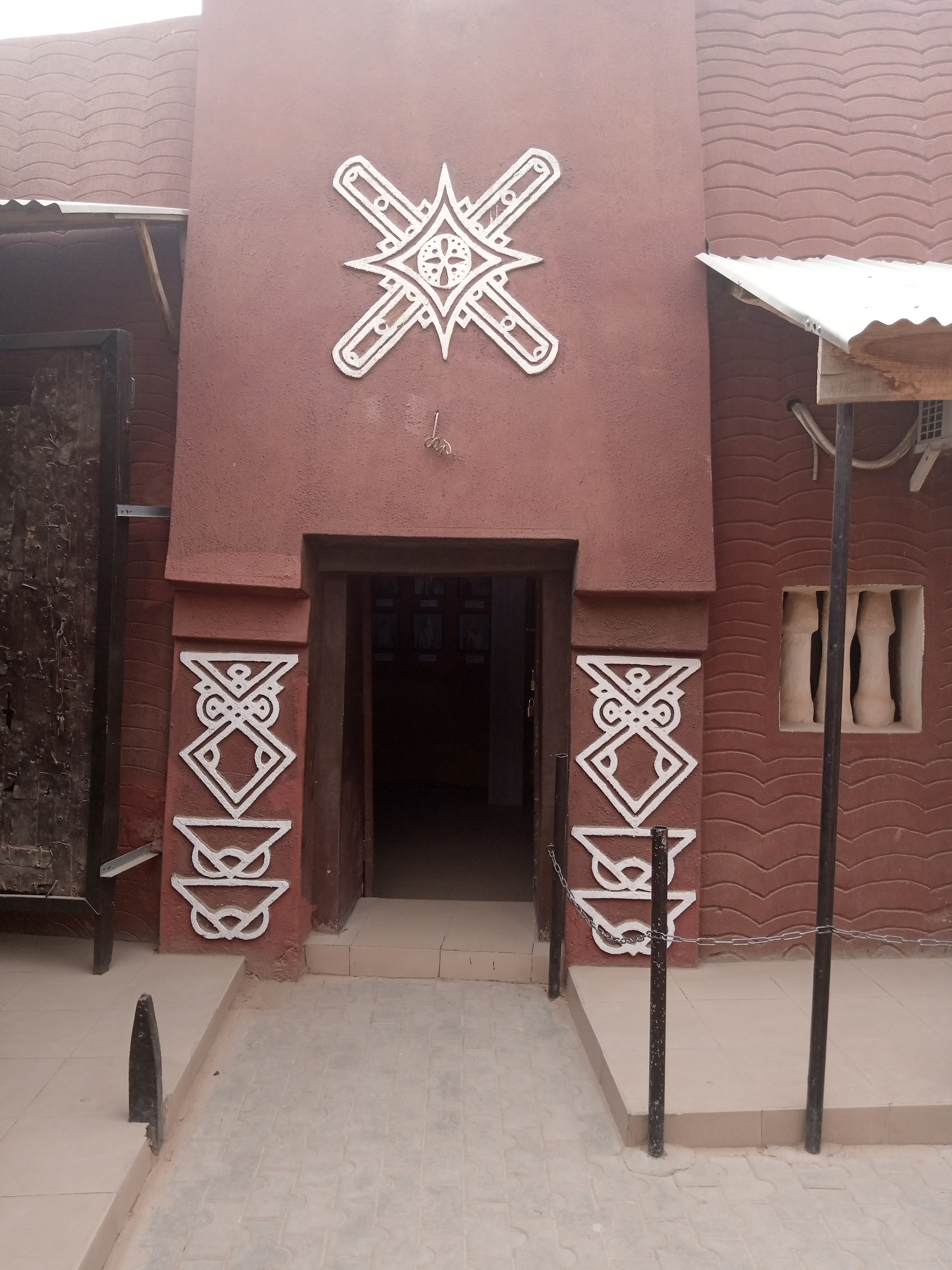
Entrance known as Zaure

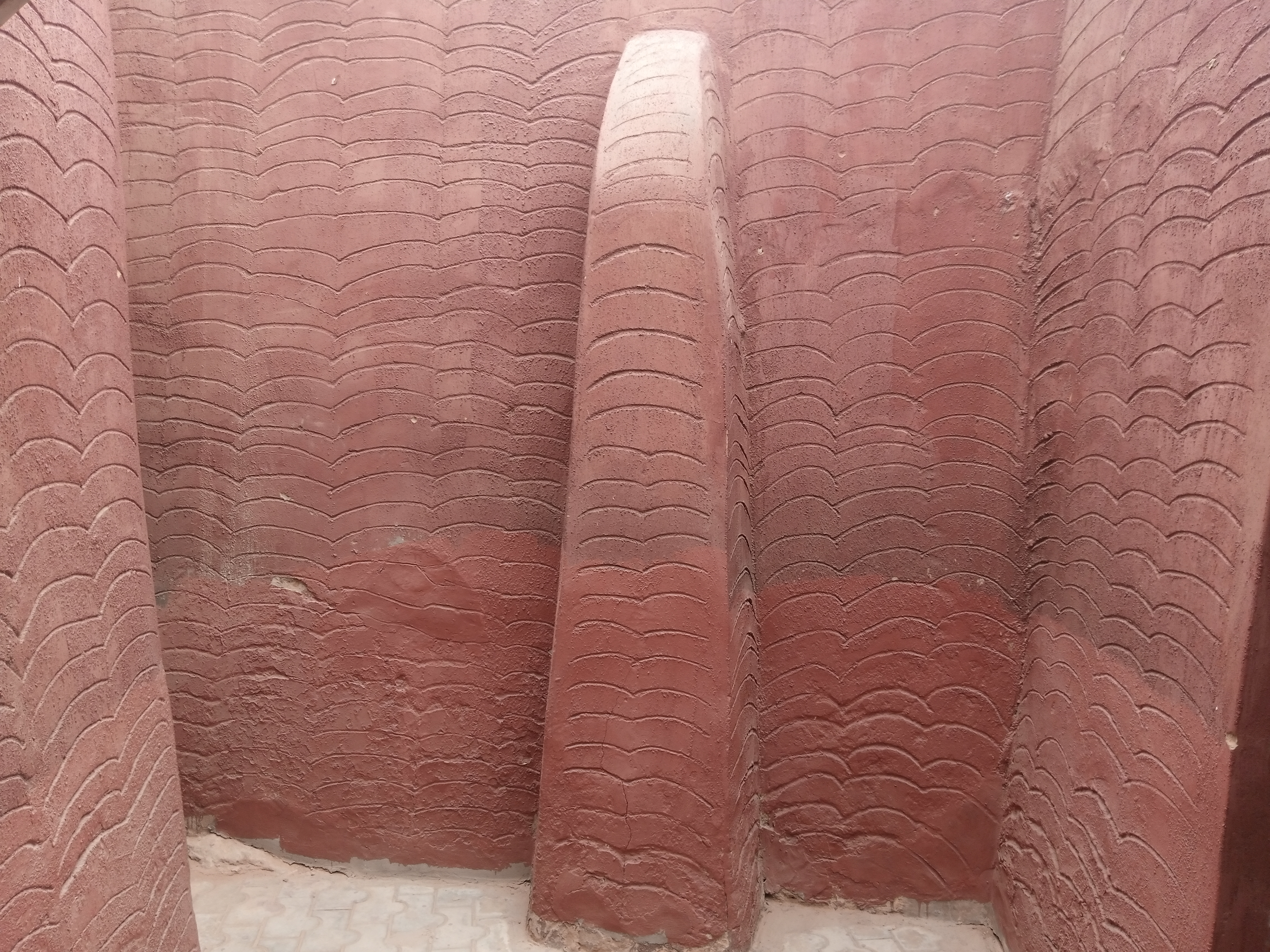
Simple pattern illustration in Walls

== See also ==
- Sudano-Sahelian architecture
- Babban Gwani (legendary Hausa architect)
