= Ola-dele Kuku =

Nigerian architect (born 1963)

Ola-Dele Kuku
- Born: 8 August 1963; Lagos, Nigeria
- Died: 11 October 2021 (aged 58); Ukkel, Belgium
- Education: SCI-Arc; Architecture Intermundium
- Occupation: Architect
- Practice: Ola-Dele Kuku Projects
- Website: Ola-DeleKuku.com

Ola-Dele Kuku (8 August 1963 – 11 October 2021) was a Nigerian architect and artist of Yoruba origin. He lived and worked between Nigeria and Belgium.

== Formation and career ==
Ola-Dele Kuku studied at (SCI-Arc), the Southern California Institute of Architecture (1984 - 1986), in Los Angeles, California, U.S. and in Vico Morcote, Ticino, Switzerland (1986 - 1988). He also attended Architecture Intermundium in Milan, Italy(1988 - 1990), for advanced architecture studies, where he collaborated with Daniel Libeskind on the City Edge project (Berlin), and the Berlin Jewish Museum competition.

Kuku was captivated by the study of proportion and created structures to challenge common conception of living space and traditional architectural restraints.

At this immaterial production Kuku also having more works related to the subject such as "Opera Domestica" a series consisting of furniture wooden sculpture that condense the structures and functions of architectural space in the object space.

== Awards and prizes ==
Ola-Dele Kuku has successfully participated in numerous events and international competitions such as:

- ’Grand Prize - Prime Minister’s Prize' Award - IFI Nagoya International Design Competition, Nagoya, Japan, 1995
- ’License of Honour' Tech-Art Prize Award - Vlaamse Ingenieurs kamer, Antwerp, Belgium, 1995
- Henry Van De Velde Prize - 'Prize of the Public Award' - VIZO at the Design Museum, Ghent, Belgium, 1997
- ‘Honourable Mention’ Award - Nagoya Do International Design Competition, Nagoya Japan, 1998
- ’Mention Spéciale pour la Créativité' - Biennale pour l'Art Contemporain Africain Dak'ART, Dakar Senegal 2000
- Lauréat - SPES Belgian Foundation Scholarship Award (for artistic creation), Brussels Belgium.

== Exhibitions ==
- Polytechnic University of Milan, Italy (dept of Architecture) –'Home for the Muses’ (curator: Prof Remo Dorigati) 1990 - solo
- Nagoya International Center, Nagoya, Japan – ‘Teatro Dell'Archivio’ (curator: Julia Chiu) 1995 - group·
- Lineart (International Art Fair 20th Century) . Ghent, Belgium – ‘Teatro Dell'Archivio’ (curator: Martine Boucher) 1996 – solo
- Richard Foncke Gallery, Ghent, Belgium – ‘Circumstances as Consequence’ (curator Richard Foncke) 1997 - solo
- World Craft Council, Hannover, Germany (Artistry in Wood) – ‘Objects’ (curator : Inge Vranken)1997 - group
- Centre d’Art Contemporain Brussels, Belgium – ‘Detail’ (curator: Martine Boucher) 1998 - group
- Nagoya Centre, Nagoya, Japan – ‘New Neighbours’ (Similar Differences) 1999 - group
- Röhsska Museum, Gothenburg, Sweden – World Crafts Council European Prize (Fossils & Icons) 1999 - group
- Musée des Arts Décoratifs, Paris, France – World Crafts Council European Prize (Fossils & Icons) 1999 - group
- Temporary & Contemporary TenT Brussels, Belgium – ‘Celestial Mechanics I – VIII’ (curator Philippe Braems)1999 solo
- International Biennial Design Festival, Sainte-Etienne, France – ‘Detail’ 2000 – group
- Narodni Techniké Museum, Prague, Czech Republic – ‘Similar Differences’ (curator: Martine Boucher) 2000 - group
- Teatro dal Verme Milano, Italy (Donation for Child Care Trust) – ‘Aftermath’ (curator : Victor Kanu) 2001 - solo
- Middelheim Museum Antwerp Belgium – ‘Experimental Experience’ (curator : Nij De Donker) 2004 - solo.
- Swish Art Fair Milan, Italy (Montenapoleone Art Shop) – ‘Objects & Drawings’ (curator : Vilma Redis) 2004 - group.
- Porsche Haus Milan, Italy – ‘Objects & Drawings’ (curator Victor Kanu) 2004 - solo.
- Torino Art Fair, Torino, Italy – ‘Living with the Fates I-XII’ (curator : Grazia Chiasa - Fondazion D’Ars) 2004 – group.
- Galleria Mares, Pavia, Italy – ‘Ola-Dele Kuku Architect’ (curator : Maria-Angela Callisti) 2004 - solo.
- Milan Art Fair 2005 - MIART off (Spazio CIN ) – ‘Ola-Dele Kuku Prototype’ (curator : Claudio Composti) 2005 - solo.
- Galleria Luisa delle Piane, Milan, Italy – ‘Selected works’ (curator : Luisa delle Piane) 2006 - solo.
- Musée d’Ixelles Brussels, Belgium - (Art et Histoire1906 à nos jours) ’Agenda Setting’ (curator: Martine Boucher) 2008.
- FESMAN III, Dakar, Senegal ‘The Dakar Initiative’ (documentary video on visual culture) 2010 - solo.
- Philippe Laeremans Gallery Brussels, Belgium - ‘Speaking in Vernacular’ (exhibition and book launch) 2012 - solo.
- Design museum Gent, Belgium - ‘Similar Difference’ Installation - (curator : Bernadette De Loose) 2012 - solo.
- 7th Flanders Design Triennial, Genk, Belgium - ‘Agenda Setting’ - (curator : Kurt Vanbelleghem) 2013 - group
- Nigerian Pavilion - 15th International Architecture Exhibition, 'Diminished Capacity' - (curator : Camilla Boemio)

== Architecture institutions ==
Ola-Dele Kuku has lectured and offered seminars at several architecture academies.

- Politecnico di Milano – Faculty of Architecture, Milan, Italy
- Institut Supérieur d’Architecture La Cambre, Brussels, Belgium
- Technical University Delft - Dept. of Architecture, Delft, Holland
- University of Lagos – Dept. of Architecture, Lagos, Nigeria
- Berlage Institute, Amsterdam, Holland
- Akademie voor Bouwkunst, Arnhem, Holland
- Akademie voor Bouwkunst, Tilburg, Holland
- KU Leuven - Sint Lucas Architectuur, Brussels, Belgium
- KU Leuven - Sint Lucas Architectuur, Gent, Belgium

== Publications ==
- Matteo Galiazzo, Ola-Dele Kuku Antwerpen : ABC2004, 2005. ISBN 9789077362365
- L’Arca n° 51 – ‘L’Utopia del Progetto’ by Mautizio Vitta, (Milan, Italy 1991).
- Arch and Life n° 69 – ‘Opera Domestica 1’ by Marc Gossé (Brussels, Belgium 1995).
- Noc n° 26 – ‘In the beginning’ by Julia Chiu (Nagoya, Japan 1996).
- L’Arca n° 112 – ‘Opera Domestica’ by Maurizio Vitta (Milan, Italy 1997).
- Kwintessens n° 1 – ‘Ola-Dele Kuku’ Profile by Christian Oosterlinck (Brussels, Belgium 1997).
- De Morgan – January ‘De betonnen bonker van Noah’ by Farida O’Seery (Brussels, Belgium 1997).
- Knack n° 47 – ‘Kasten als Kathedralen’ by Jean-Pierre Gabriel (Brussels, Belgium 1997).
- Knack n° 13 – ‘Dromen Van Een Kerkhof’ by Max Borka (Brussels, Belgium 1998).
- Trends n° 46 – ‘Leegte is de Drijfreer’ by Margot Vanderstraeten (Brussels, Belgium 1998).
- Revue Noir n° 30 – ‘Nigeria’ Ola-Dele Kuku Profile (Paris, France 1998).
- Feeling Wonen n° 09/0015 – ‘Sculpturen vol geheimen’ by Hilde Bouchez (Brussels, Belgium 1999).
- Revue Noir n° 31 – ‘Project de Ville’ Ola-Dele Kuku Profile ( Paris, France 1999).
- Vernissage n° 1/7 – ‘Ola-Dele Kuku’ by Mia Dekeersemaker (Amsterdam, the Netherlands 2000).
- Object n° 16 – ‘Diptych’ by Hans Fonck (Amsterdam, the Netherlands 2000).
- Passion Architecture n° 9 – ‘L’architecture au-delà frontières’ (Paris, France 2004).
- Trends n° 20 – ‘Het denkende design van Ola-Dele Kuku’ by Sérge Vanmaercke (Brussels, Belgium 2004).
- Trends n° 20 – ‘Le no nonsense d’un Yoruba à Bruxelles’ by Sérge Vanmaercke (Brussels, Belgium 2004).
- Luxos n° 5 – ‘I pezzi unici dell’architetto Ola-Dele Kuku’ by Alessia Franchini (Milan, Italy 2005).
- U Magazine n° 042 – ‘Ola-Dele Kuku’ U profile (Hong Kong, China 2006).
- Area Revue n° 16 – ‘Desseins de structures urbaines’ by Alexandre Mensah (Paris, France 2008).
- Nubian's Magazine n° 7 – ‘La dialectique de l’ordre et du chaos’ by Roger Ndéma Kingué (Brussels, Belgium 2010)
- Kwintessens Magazine n° 2 – ‘Ontwerpen voor Conflict en Chaos’ interview by Kurt Vanbelleghem (Brussels, Belgium 2011)
- ‘Speaking in Vernacular’ (Ola-Dele Kuku monograph), – Texts by Sara Weyns, F. Kehinde Oluyadi, Chika Unigwe, and Roger Ndéma Kingué (Brussels, Belgium, 2012)
- `The Saga Continues’ (Ola-Dele Kuku monograph), - Text by Sara Weyns (Antwerp, Belgium, 2013)
- `7th Flanders Design Triennial‘, (Conflict and Design) - ‘Agenda Setting’ (the running mean) - interview by Elien Haentjens (Genk, Belgium, 2013)
- `7th Flanders Design Triennial‘, (Conflict and Design) - ‘Conflict Culture’ - Text by Ola-Dele Kuku (Genk, Belgium, 2013)

== See also ==
- Contemporary African Art
- List of Nigerian architects
