= David Aradeon =

Nigerian architect (1933–2024)

- Born: November 7, 1933; Lagos, Nigeria
- Died: September 30, 2024 (aged 90); Florida, U.S.
- Other name: Olatunde
- Education: Columbia University, New York
- Occupations: Architect, urban Planner, curator
- Honours: Nigerian National Order of Merit (NNOM)

David Olatunde Aradeon (November 7, 1933 – September 30, 2024) was a Nigerian architect, urban planner and curator.

== Career ==
David Aradeon was born in Lagos, and started his architectural education in 1959 at Columbia University in New York. After his graduation in 1966, he worked for three different architectural firms in New York and then returned to Nigeria. In 1968, he was awarded a three-year Ford Fellowship to study the human settlements in western and North Africa. At the University of Lagos, he was a lecturer in the Department of Architecture, where he was appointed Professor in 1979. Aradeon founded the Sankore Institute for African Environment and Development in Lagos, which he headed for many years. He co-founded the non-profit organization Build with Earth for the promotion of building with earth. In 1977, he curated the African Architectural Technology Exhibition for the Festival of African Cultures in Lagos. He was curator of the exhibition "Views of Lagos" and was shown at the ifa galleries in Stuttgart 2004–2005 Berlin. In 2007, his research focused on movement of forms and antecedents of Afro-Brazilian spaces.

Aradeon was licensed as an architect in Nigeria. In addition to his academic work as a lecturer, he was also the founding partner of the architectural firm Studio 4 Associates, shown at Documenta 12 in Kassel. He designed, among other projects, residential buildings in Ibadan and Lagos, the elementary school buildings for the University of Lagos Women Society, the entire campus of the Lagos State University (1988), the showrooms and offices of the National Council of Arts and Culture in Iganmu, Lagos, the auditorium of the University of Port Harcourt and the National Cultural Complex in Abuja (2003).

Aradeon lived and worked in Lagos. Aradeon died on September 30, 2024, at the age of 90.

== Selected publications ==
- David Aradeon (1998). Architecture: The Search for Identity and Continuity (an Inaugural Lecture Delivered at the University of Lagos). University of Lagos Press. ISBN 978-017-063-4.
- David Aradeon (1977). African Architectural Technology exhibitions. International Secretariat, 2nd World Black and African Festival of Arts and Culture, 1977.
- David Aradeon, Siyanbola Tomori and Ajato Gandonu. Medium and Small Size Settlement in Development Strategy in Badagry-Porto Novo Region. In Booshan, B. S. (ed.), Towards Alternative Settlement Strategies: The Role of Small and Intermediate Centers in the Development Process. New York: Heritage Publishers, 1980.

== See also ==
- List of Nigerian architects
