= Ajato Gandonu =

Nigerian town planner and geographer

Ajato Gandonu (born Ajatọ Amos Gandonu in January 1939) is a Nigerian town planner, geographer and retired professor of geography. He served as a Commissioner for Education in Lagos State, and was a member of the expert panel led by Justice Akinọla Aguda which recommended the relocation of Nigeria's the relocation of Nigeria's federal capital from Lagos to Abuja.

== Background and education ==
Born in January 1939 in Lagos, Gandonu has his root among the Ogu people of Nigeria. He received his master's degree at the University College London, following which he proceeded to the University of Leicester for his doctorate degree in Geography on a postgraduate research scholarship awarded by the Lagos State Government. His doctoral dissertation, which was completed in 1974, was entitled "Land Use and Industrialisation in Lagos, Nigeria."

== Career ==
Following his doctoral studies, Gandonu was engaged as a research fellow at the Nigerian Institute of Social and Economic Research in Ibadan. It was from there that he was appointed, alongside six other members including the renowned educator and critic Tai Solarin, to serve on the Federal Capital Territory Location Panel inaugurated on August 12, 1975, by the then Head of State, Brigadier General Murtala Muhammed, to consider the role of Lagos as a federal capital and to advise on the desirability or otherwise of retaining that role. Both Solarin and Gandonu had already written publicly in favour of relocation and on the choice of Abuja. The committee recommended that the federal capital be relocated from Lagos, and the movement of the new capital and seat of government was finally announced by General Ibrahim Babangida, the then Military Head of State, on December 12, 1991. In honour of that service, there is a street in Jabi, Abuja named after Ajato Gandonu.

Subsequently, Gandonu took a position as an research fellow at Harvard University from 1979 to 1981, and was appointed professor and director of Environmental Studies at the National Open University, Abuja in 1981. He has also held several public appointments including serving as board member, Lagos State Development and Property Corporation, 1976 to 79; Member, Board of Directors, Federal Capital Development Authority, Abuja, 1981 to 1983; and as the Lagos State Commissioner for Education from 1987 to 1991.

== Selected publications ==
Ajato Gandonu. "Nigeria's 250 Ethnic Groups: Realities and Assumptions." In Regina E. Holloman and Serghei A. Arutiunov (eds.), Perspectives on Ethnicity. The Hague and Paris: Mouton, 1978, 243–79. (In this work, it was noted that his surname had changed from Amos to Gandonu on January 1, 1975).

Ajato Gandonu. "Land Requirement for Transportation Purposes in Nigeria," in Onakomaiya, S.O and Ekanem, N.F. (eds.), Transportation in Nigerian National Development, Proceedings of a Conference held at the University of Ibadan, July 4–9, 1977. Ibadan: NISER, 1981.

David Aradeon, Tomori Siyanbola, and Gandonu Ajato. "Nigeria/Benin Area: Medium and Small Size Settlements in Development Strategy in Badagry-Porto Novo Region." In Booshan B. S. (ed.), Towards Alternative Settlement Strategies: The Role of Small and Intermediate Centers in the Development Process. New York: Heritage Publishers, 1980, 215–286.

Ajato Gandonu. "Abuja: Planning the Nation's Capital." In Development Planning in Nigeria: Planning Experience in a Developing Economy. Ibadan: Nigerian Institute of Social and Economic Research, University of Ibadan, 1983.

Ajato Amos. "Focus on the South Eastern State of Nigeria." The Nigerian, Vol. 1, No. 1 (1970).

Ajato Amos. "Modern Yorubas: A Nigerian People in Cultural Transition." In Proceedings of the VIII International Congress of Anthropological and Ethnological Sciences, Vol. III. Tokyo and Kyoto: Science Council of Japan, 1968, 42-44

Ajatọ Amos. "The Use of Oral Tradition for Reconstructing the Past." In Proceedings of the VIII International Congress of Anthropological and Ethnological Sciences, Vol. III. Tokyo and Kyoto: Science Council of Japan, 1968.
