= Babban Gwani =

19th-century Hausa architect

Mallam Mikhaila Babban Gwani
- The decorated entrance gate of palace of the Emir of Zaria built by Mallam Mikhaila in the 19th-century for Abd al-Karim ɗan Abbas, Sarkin Zazzau.
- Born: Muhammadu Durubu; Zaria
- Died: 1862; Birnin Gwari
- Other name: Kakan Maigini (the grandfather of builders)
- Era: Sokoto era
- Known for: Hausa architecture
- Notable work: Masallacin Juma'an Zaria (Zaria's Friday Mosque)
- Title: Sarkin Maigini (chief builder)

Babban Gwani, also known as Mallam Mikhaila, was an influential 19th-century Hausa architect and builder who flourished during the reign of the 61st ruler of Zazzau, Nigeria, Abd al-Karim ɗan Abbas. He was the Sarkin Maigini (chief builder) of his time, appointed by Shehu Usman dan Fodio. This position was passed down to his direct male descendants.

== Life ==
Mallam Mikhaila was born in Zaria, within the Zazzau emirate, to a Hausa family of craftsmen. During his childhood, he made toys and figurines from clay. His craftsmanship earned him the nickname Gwani, signifying an artisan. This nickname was given to only a select few craftsmen in the past two centuries, with a total of six individuals receiving this honour. As Mikhaila grew older, his reputation continued to increase, primarily due to his expertise in constructing mud buildings, he ascended to the title of Babban Gwani, denoting 'the great expert' or 'the great builder.' Presently, this title is exclusively retained for his male descendants, while the designation of Gwani predominantly associates with his students.

Mikhaila's initial reputation stemmed from his speed in construction. He preferred building by night, often completing a substantial portion of a structure by the following day. This nocturnal work schedule may have been driven by his spirituality, as he likely regarded the act of building as a spiritual endeavor. His workforce consisted of approximately one hundred laborers, primarily slaves, entrusted with the task of collecting mud and thatched clay in preparation for his evening work. He was also known for making no plans for building, relying on an improvisational approach to building.

His growing reputation throughout Hausaland, attracted the attention of the new emirs and officials following the Sokoto Jihad. The aristocracy sought his expertise to construct and design monuments that symbolized the 'fervour' of the Islamic movement led by the jihadists. In 1824, the Scottish explorer Hugh Clapperton witnessed Mikhaila at work overseeing construction of a new mosque financed by Gidado dan Laima, the Wazirin Sokoto. Clapperton described Mikhaila as "a shrewd-looking little man." The mosque was the city of Sokoto’s third main mosque and was located to the west of the Uthman dan Fodio mosque and palace.

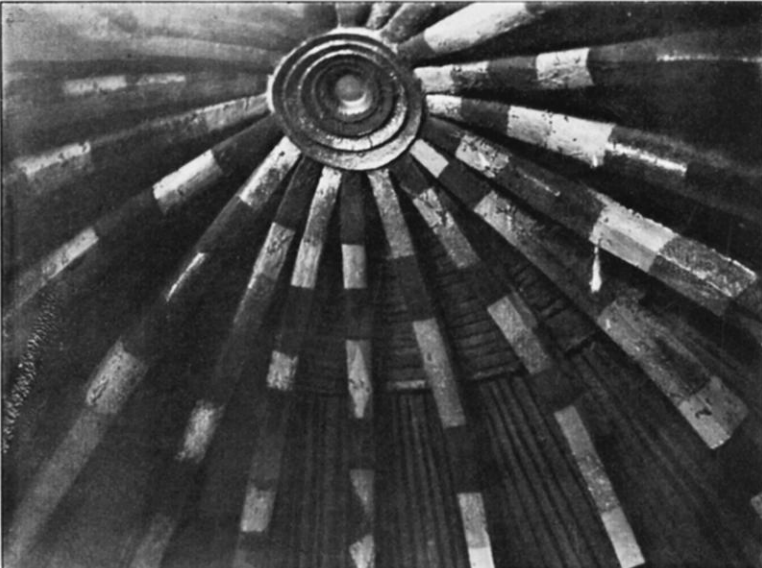
Babban Gwani's signature bakan gizo (vaulted arches) can be seen on the ceiling in the audience hall of the Babban Soro quarters within the Gidan Rumfa palace in Kano.

Mallam Mikhaila was executed at the hands of the Emir of Birnin Gwari. This unfolded subsequent to the emir's commissioning of a mosque, with the specific aim of replicating the grandeur of the Masallacin Juma'an Zaria. The emir's primary motivation behind this project was to establish a structure of such unparalleled magnificence that no other building would ever be able to equal the one in Birnin Gwari.

== Notable works ==
=== Masallacin Juma'an Zaria ===
Arguably, Mallam Mikhaila's most renowned work is the Friday Mosque of Zaria, known as Masallacin Juma'an Zaria, completed in the 1830s during the reign of Sarkin Zazzau Abd al-Karim (1834-1846). Mikhaila is said to have left his handprint above an arch within the structure.

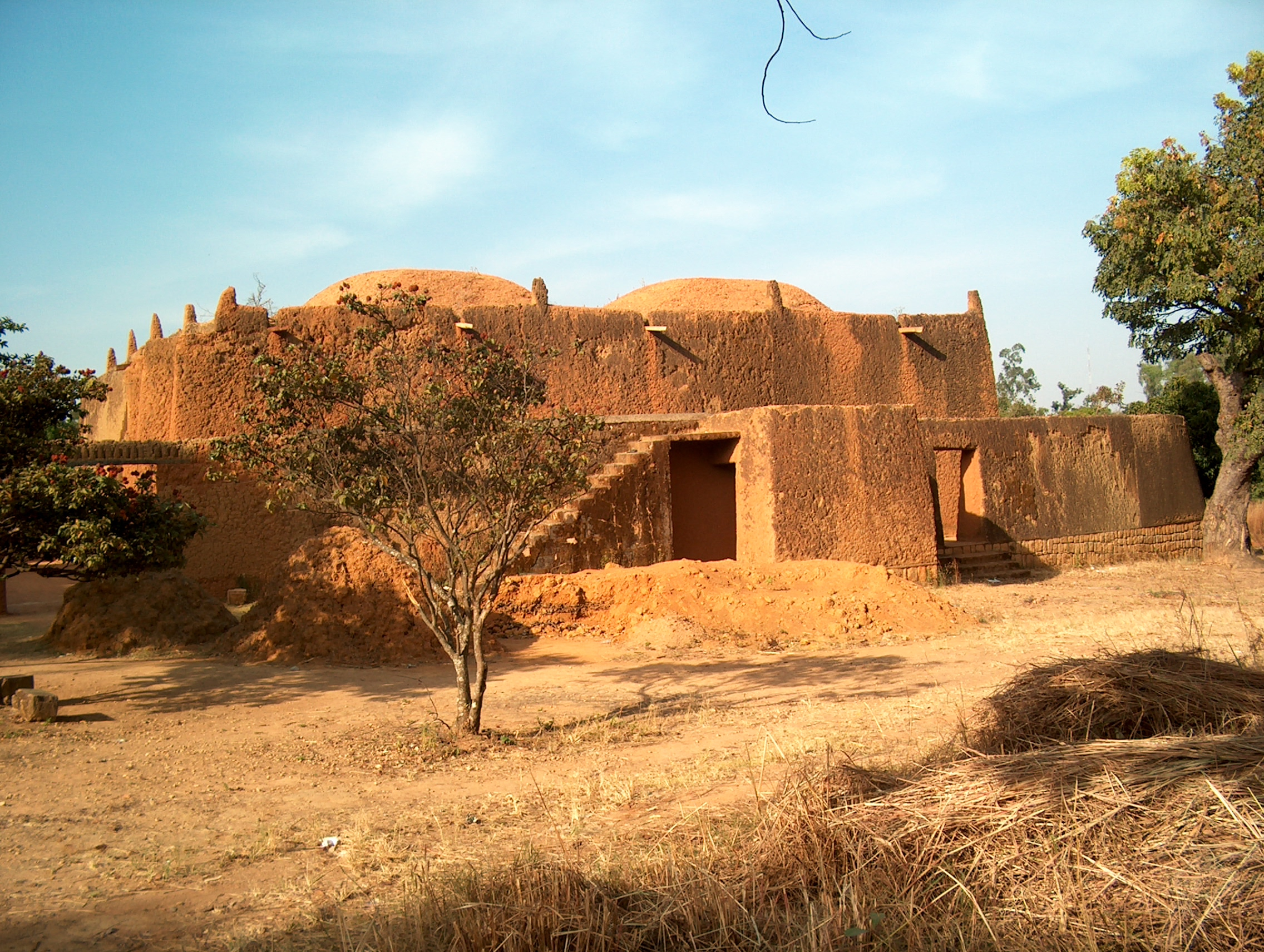
Masallacin Juma'an Zaria

It consists of a complex of buildings including a main hall for worship, a Shari'a Court, and an ablution chambers. In the construction of the mosque, Mikhaila drew inspiration from various traditional Hausa building techniques. He also incorporated structural elements inspired by the nomadic Fulani tents. The Fulbe, traditionally nomadic, had transitioned into the aristocratic class of Hausaland following the Sokoto Jihad. This transformation saw their temporary tent structures evolve into the vaulted mud dwellings that characterized the region. This architectural adaptation allowed for the creation of more spacious rooms, a crucial consideration for the grand scale of the mosque. The mosque continues to serve as a place of worship to this day, two centuries later. Tragically, on 11 August 2023, a portion of the mosque's roof collapsed during the Asr prayer, resulting in the loss of over ten lives. Reports indicate that the incident was attributed to poor maintenance of the ancient structure. Sarkin Zazzau Ahmed Nuhu Bamalli reported that the process of reconstructing the mosque had been started, and an investigation into the incident had also been launched. Billionaire Philanthropist Abdul Samad Rabiu reportedly donated $2.5 million for its reconstruction.

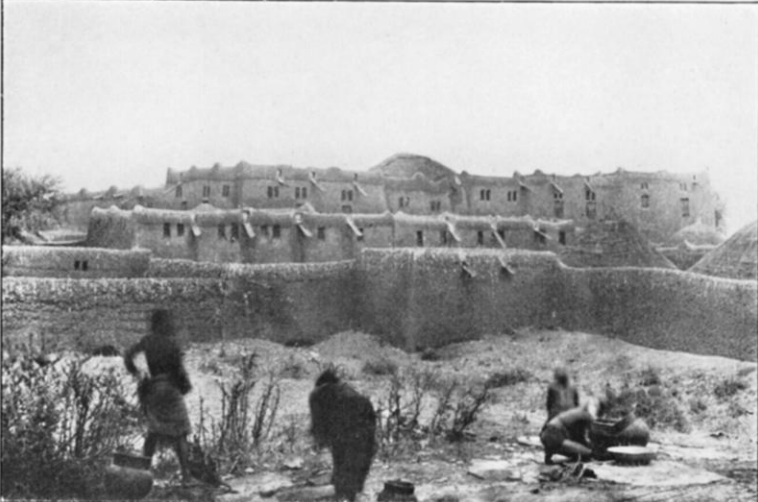
The Babban Soro quarters (1903)

=== Dakin Gwani ===
Abdullahi dan Dabo, the 47th Sarkin Kano, enlisted the services of Mikhail to renovate sections of Gidan Rumfa, the palace of the Emir of Kano. Specifically, the south-easterly living chambers of the prejihadic rulers of Kano. He also undertook the construction of the official residence for the emir which was called "Babban Gwani" in respect to Mikhaila. However, during the reign of Aliyu Babba (1894-1903), the name was changed to "Katon Gwani" due to Aliyu's existing nickname, "Babba," which rendered the original name inappropriate. Today, this area is known as "Dakin Gwani," translating to "Gwani's room."

Mikhaila also constructed the monumental two-story Babban Soro quarters of Abdullahi. He further constructed the Soron Giwa, colloquially known as "the Hall of the Elephant," in honor of Ibrahim Dabo, who was the father of Abdullahi and ruled as the ruler of Kano from 1819 to 1846.

=== Gidan Madakin Bauchi ===
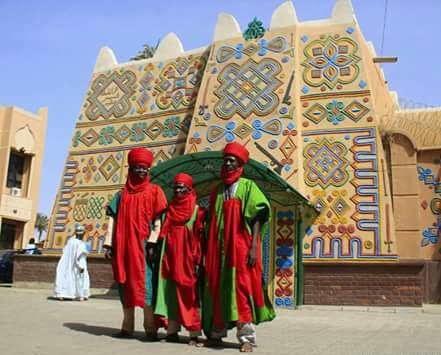
The Babban Gwani Chambers in the palace of the Emir of Bauchi

Mikhaila was invited to the emirate of Bauchi to construct several structures for the emirate's aristocracy. Among the structures constructed, the most well known were ones he built for the then Madakin Bauchi, Abdulkadiri. They are collectively known as Gidan Madakin Bauchi or "the house of the Madaki of Bauchi" and are located in Kafin Madaki which is about 45 kilometers north of Bauchi city. The main hall came to be known as Babban Gwani after Mikhaila. It was fitted with leather-covered doors, which was quite rare for buildings at the time. Adjacent to it is a mosque, that shares similarities with the zaure of Gidan Makama in Kano.

The structures were constructed between 1850 and 1860, during the reign of Ibrahima dan Yaqubu (r.1845-1877). In 1956, it was declared as one of Nigeria's first national monuments. Despite receiving minimal maintenance over the years, the building remained well-preserved. More recently, significant restoration work has been undertaken by the Department of Antiquities to ensure its continued preservation.

== Legacy ==
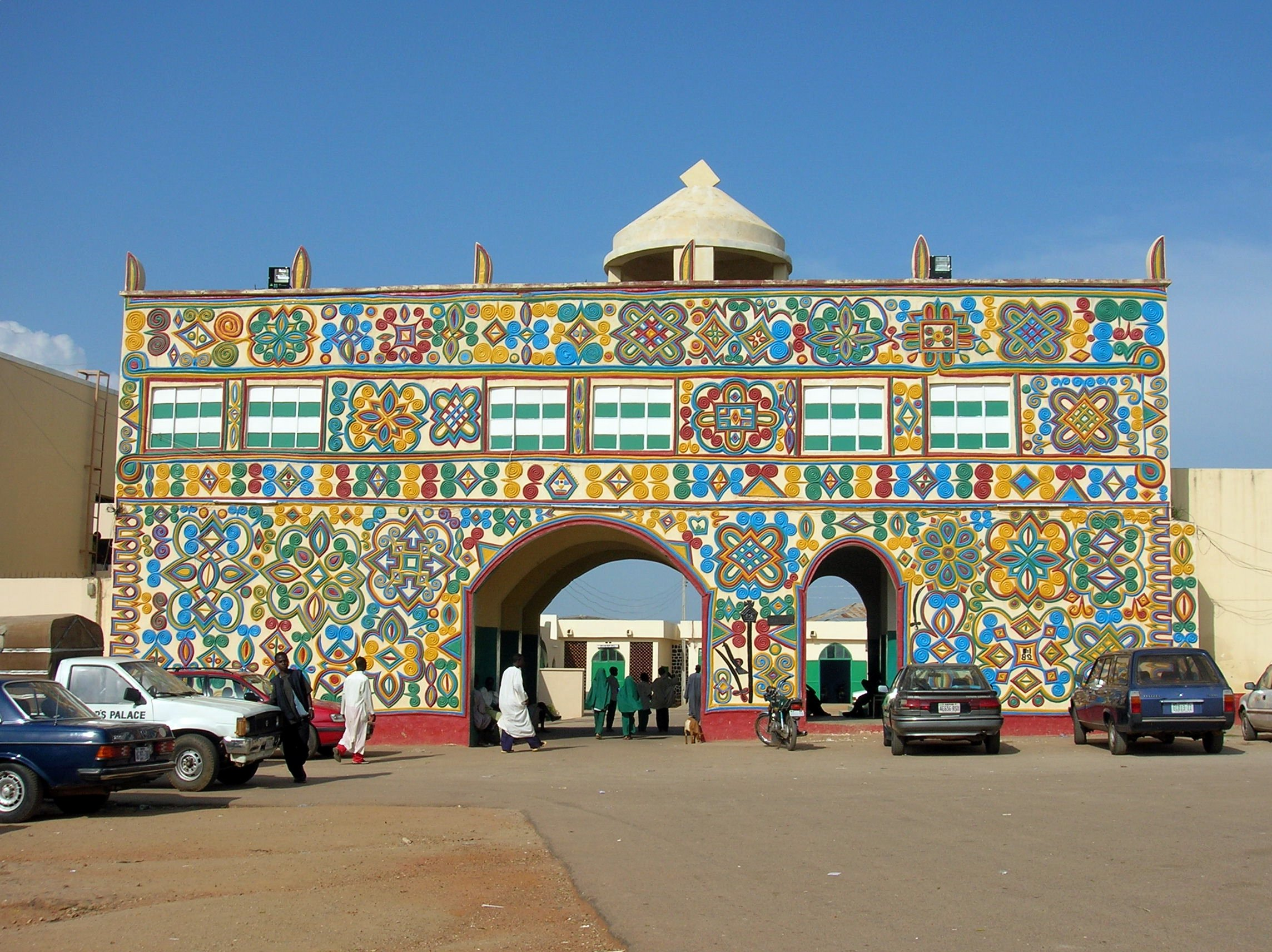
The Kofar Gidan Sarki in Zaria was designed by Mallam Haruna, a descendant of Mallam Mikhaila (Babban Gwani). It was completed in the 1980s during the reign of Shehu Idris.

The Babban Gwani ward in Zaria stands as a lasting tribute to Mallam Mikhaila's legacy. Today, this ward is predominantly inhabited by builders, many of whom are his direct descendants. These descendants continue to uphold the family tradition, with their expertise often sought after to construct buildings in his distinctive style. Notably, when the Emir's palace in Bauchi suffered damage due to rain in 2017, Gwani's descendants were summoned to lead the reconstruction and redesign of the affected sections.

One of Mallam Mikhaila's most renowned descendants is Mallam Haruna, who held the title of Sarkin Maigini during his time. Although he infused his designs with a greater degree of expressiveness, Haruna's architectural style remained heavily influenced by the principles established by Mallam Mikhaila. An illustrative example of this is seen in the gate to the palace of Zazzau after the old one was demolished by Shehu Idris (r. 1975 - 2020). In 1980–81, Haruna was tasked with overseeing and designing the construction of a new gate. This gate departed from the traditional Hausa use of mud, opting instead for cement blocks in its construction.
