= Lanre Towry-Coker =

Nigerian architect and politician

- Born: 1944 (age 81–82)
- Occupation: Architect

Dr. Lanre Towry-Coker FRIBA (born 1944) is a Nigerian architect, politician and socialite. He has worked in the public sector as well as the private sector and was the first Commissioner for Works and Housing of Lagos State.

== Early life and career ==
Born in 1944 to a Nigerian civil engineer, who was the planning adviser to the first Prime Minister of Malaysia, Tunku Abdul Rahman, in the early 1960s, Lanre Towry-Coker attended St. Matthias School, Lagos, and Kingston College, Surrey, England, before going on to the Architectural Association School of Architecture and the University of North-East London for his architectural training. He subsequently earned a further qualification from the Harvard University Graduate School of Business Administration (OPM).

He established his architectural firm, Towry-Coker Associates, in 1976. An indigene of Lagos (Towry Street on Lagos Island was named after his family) He was one of the original planners of the capital city Abuja, and has won numerous awards for his work on major buildings in Nigeria.

In 1999, Towry-Coker was the first Commissioner for Works and Housing in Lagos State. He is the author of the book Housing Policy And The Dynamics Of Housing Delivery In Nigeria: Lagos State As Case Study, published by MakeWay Press in 2012.

Towry-Coker is a Fellow of the Nigerian Institute of Architects (FNIA) and an Associate of the Chartered Institute of Arbitrators (ACI.Arb.) in the UK. In 2017 he was elected a Fellow of the Royal Institute of British Architects, the only Nigerian and one of currently just 30 architects worldwide accorded that honour.

== Personal life ==
He married Bisi Towry-Coker but they are now separated. He has three children including a son, Olaotan.

== See also ==
- List of Nigerian architects
