= Michael Olutusen Onafowokan =

Nigerian architect (1912–1991)

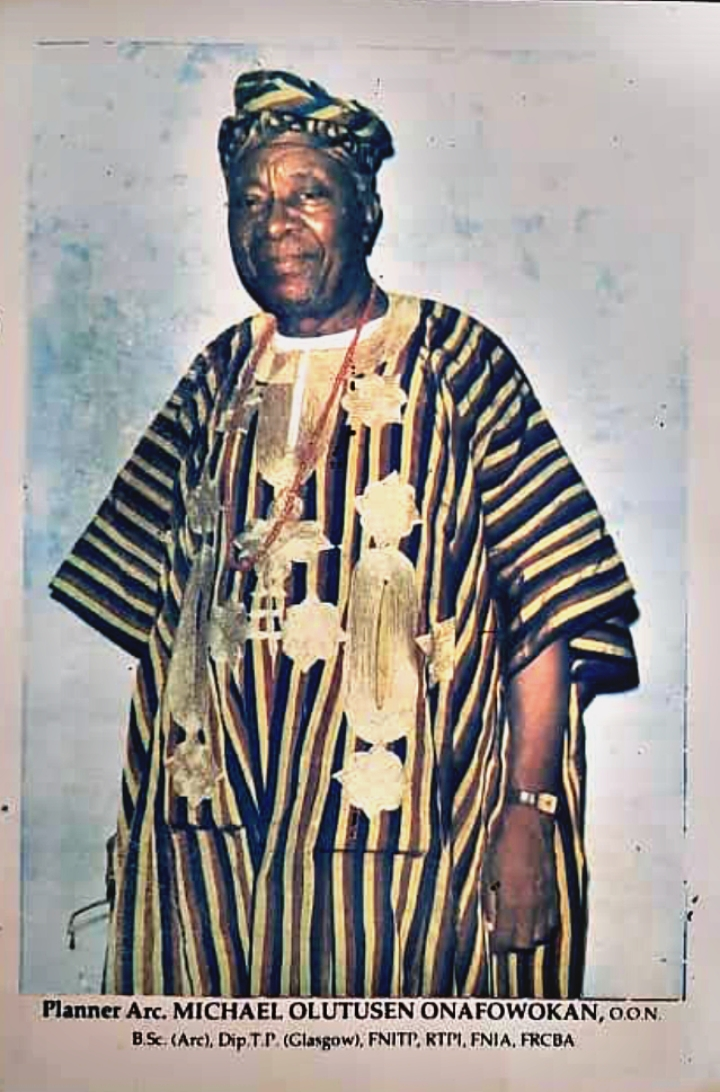
Onafowokan in 1990

Michael Olutusen Onafowokan (1912–1991) was a Nigerian architect regarded as the pioneer of architecture in Nigeria and Commonwealth Africa. He was one of the pioneers of Tropical Modernism an architectural design era that took into consideration the climatic condition of the region and attempted to curtail or utilize the climatic condition through the use of design elements, styles and concepts.

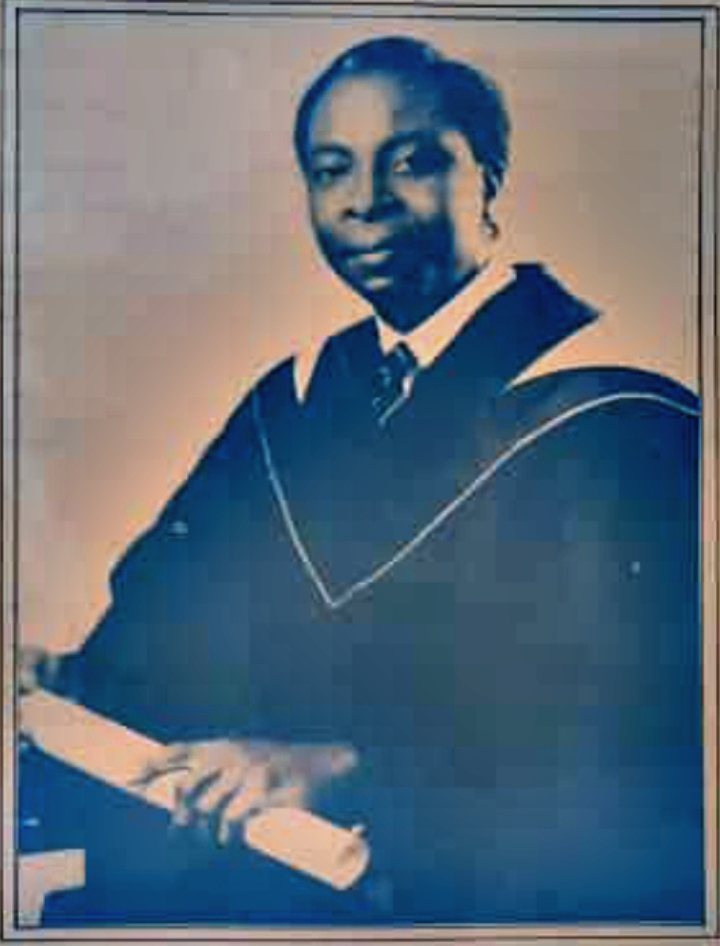
Picture of young Arc. Onafowokan Michael Olutusen

== Early life and education ==
Michael Olutusen Onafowokan was born in Ikorodu, Lagos State Nigeria where he attended the Methodist Primary School Ita-Elewa Ikorodu and St. Peters Primary School Faji-Ajele Street Lagos. For his secondary education, he attended the Methodist Boys' High School in Lagos. He passed the Junior Cambridge Examination in 1932, after which he attended the Public Works Department technical school and obtained a diploma in Civil Engineering in 1938.

In 1982 he was awarded the Order of the Niger.

== Architectural philosophy and style ==
He worked on projects and his style is typified by the utilization of green spaces in his design and the complete integration of the building with environmental elements, his style of design was mostly asymmetric.

He championed the architectural philosophy of Tropical Modernism in Nigeria, ensuring that the users of buildings are not affected by the climate. The hospitals like the Lagos State University Teaching Hospital, the Patriarch Bolaji Methodist Church which was designed in 1969 are examples of tropical modernism architectural design philosophy at play in Nigeria.

== Gallery ==
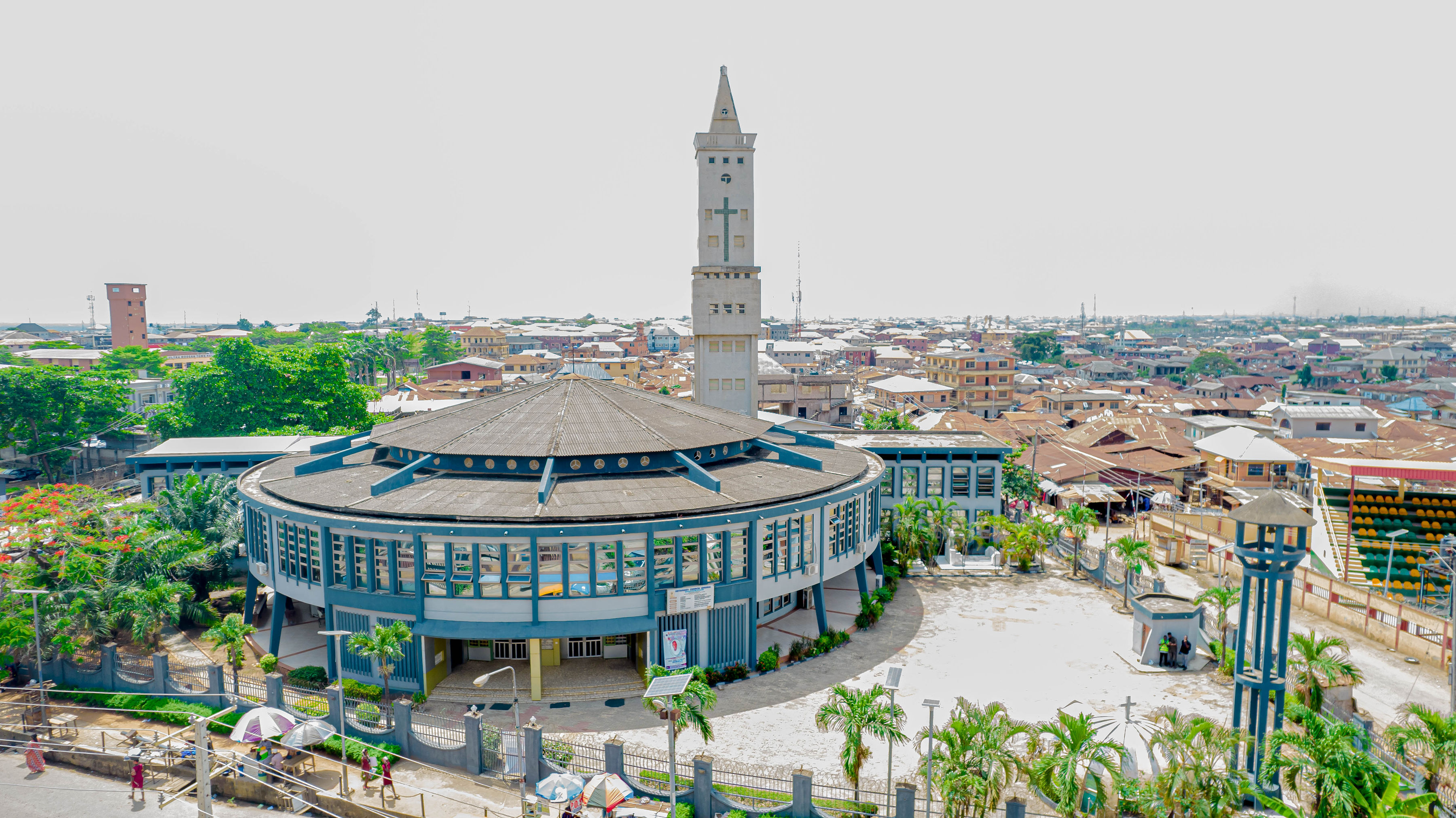
Image of the Methodist Church Ita-Elewa in Ikorodu Lagos Nigeria, designed by Arc. Onafowokan Michael Olutusen in the year 1961

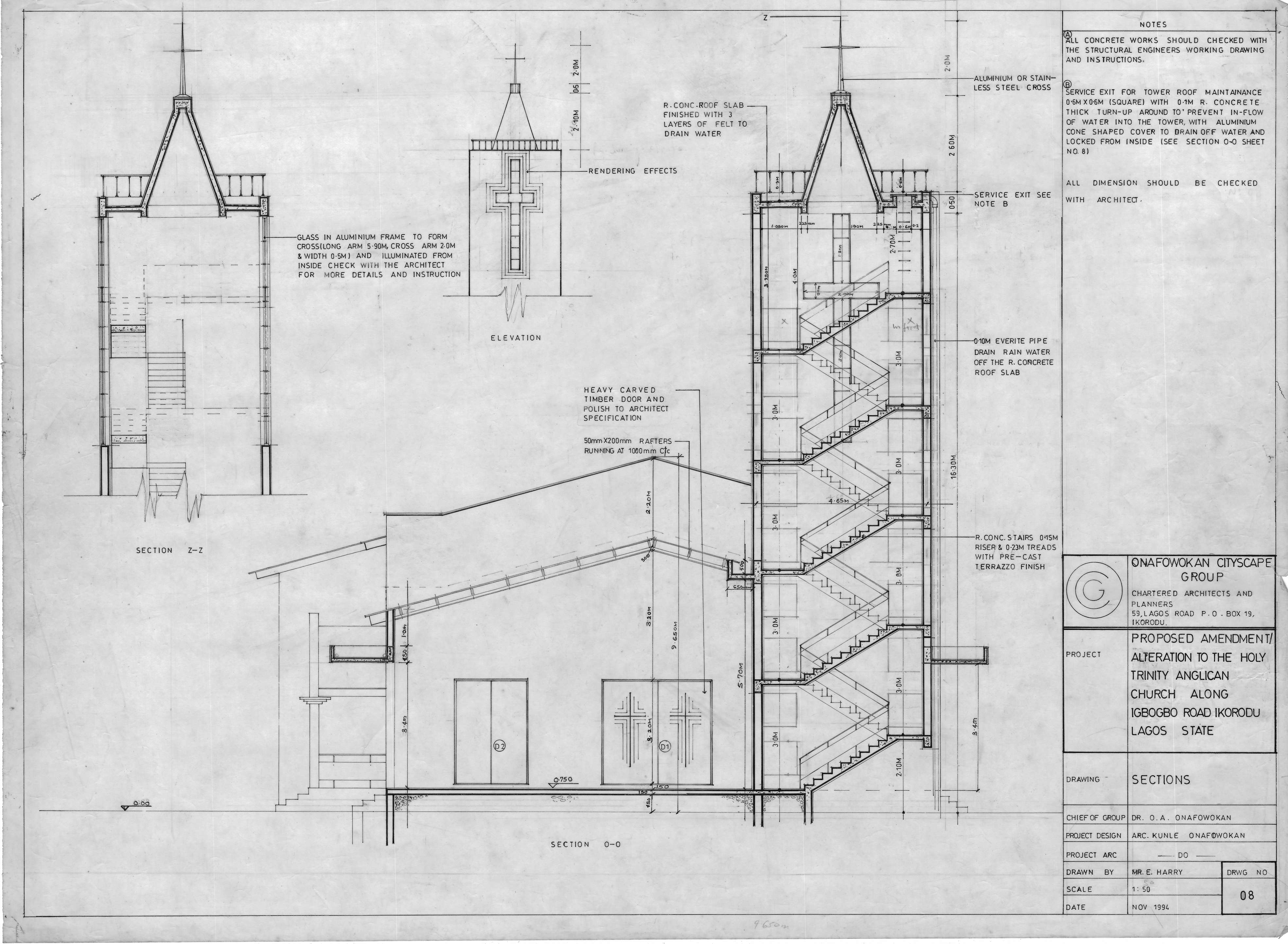
Drawing by Architect Onafowokan of design for Holy Trinity Anglican Church in Ikorodu Nigeria in the year 1994

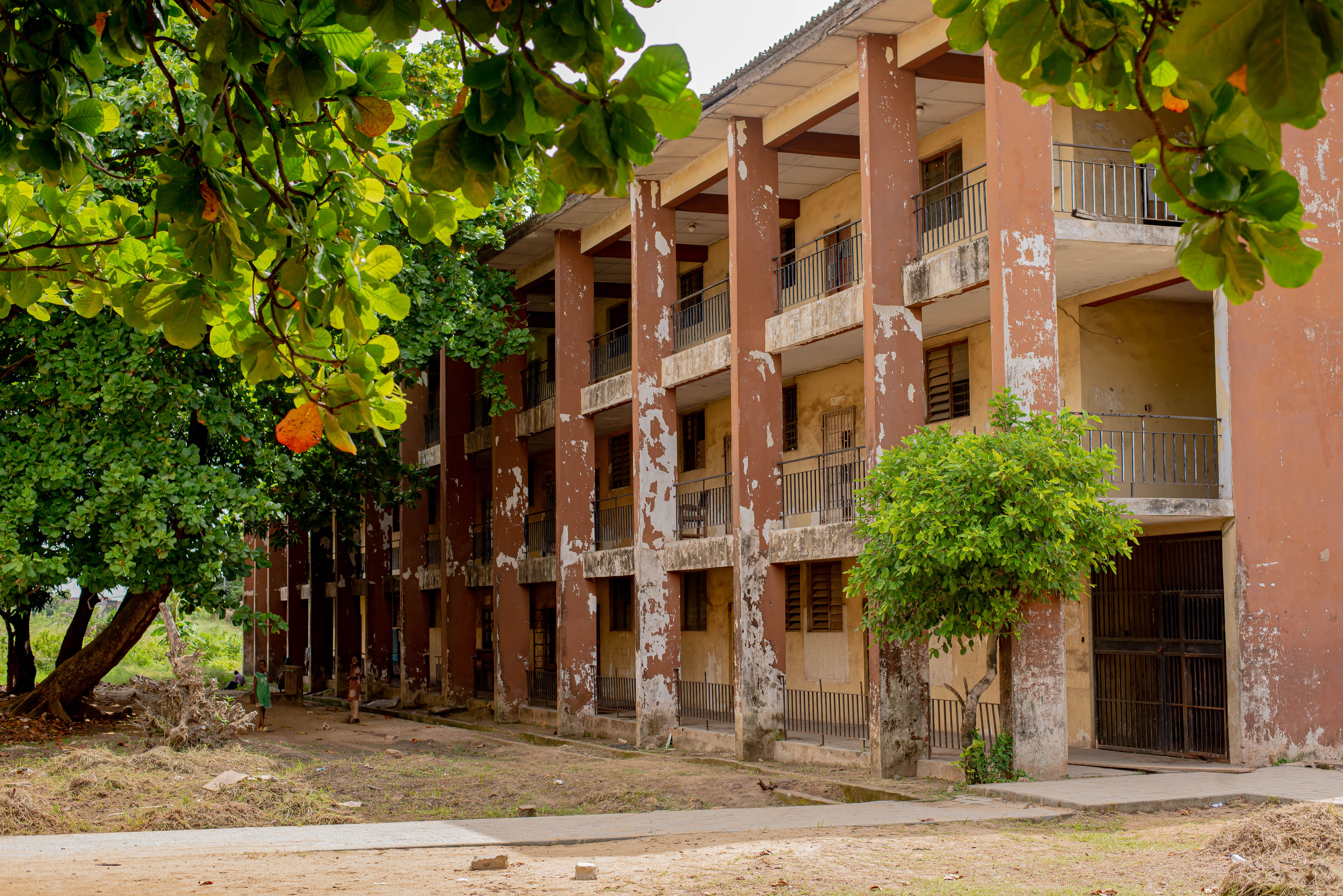
The only classroom block of the Lagos Government College by Eric Moore road Surulere, Lados State, that has not been rehabilitated designed by Onafowokan Michael Olutusen in the year 1974

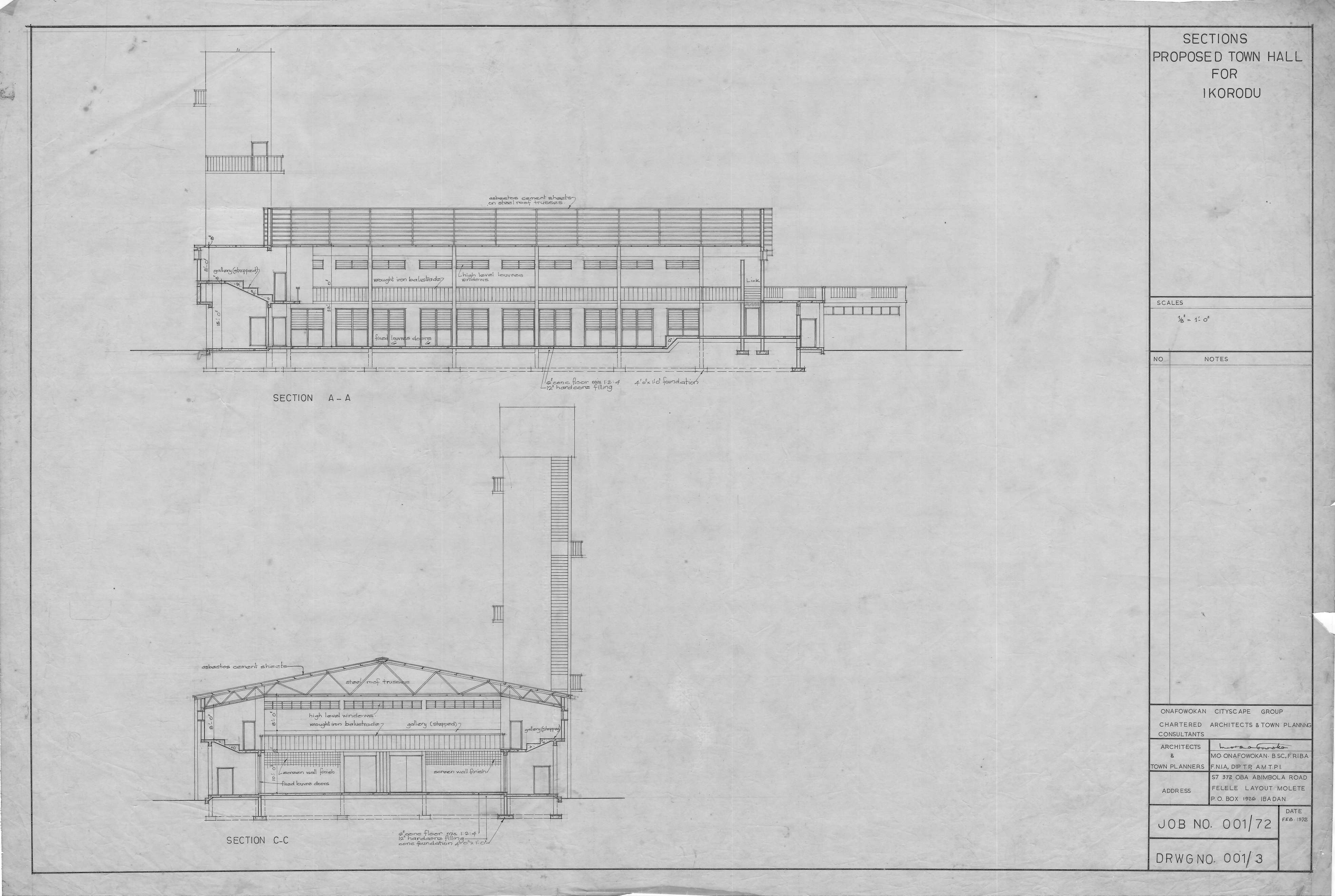
Archive of Arc. Onafowokan Michael Olutusen showing sectional view of Ikorodu Townhall
