= Gidan Makama Museum Kano =

Museum in Kano, Nigeria

Coordinates: 11.9888°N 8.5211°E

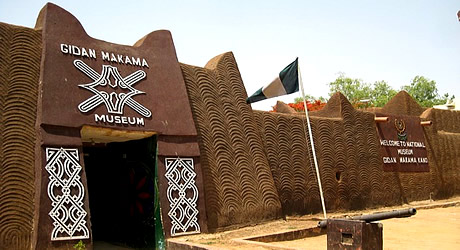
- Location: 15th-century historical building, which is recognised as a National Monument by the Government of Nigeria, Kano, Nigeria.
- Collections: arts, crafts and items of historic interest related to the Kano area
- Collection size: 11 galleries

Gidan Makama Museum Kano or Kano Museum is a museum in Kano, Nigeria. This building served as temporary palace of Sarakunan Hausa (Kings of Hausa) of Kano before the current palace Gidan Rumfa was constructed in the 15th century. The museum has a significant collections of arts, crafts and items of historic interest related to the Kano area. Located in a 15th-century historical building, which is recognised as a National Monument by the Government of Nigeria. The museum is divided into 11 galleries, each with their own centre of focus. Galleries include the Zaure or the main entrance hall with displays of traditional materials, city walls and maps of Kano, the history of statehood, Kano in the 19th century, the Civil War, economy, industry and music.

An open space inside the museum acts as a performance stage for a Koroso dance and drama group.

== History ==
The house was originally built in the 15th century for Muhammad Rumfa then the young grandchild of the Hausa monarch who had just been appointed Makama Kano, a traditional title. Rumfa later became King and moved to a new palace but subsequent Makamas lived in the building. After the British capture of Kano in 1903, the place briefly served as an office for the colonial officers in Kano. The structure was later divided into three parts. One section became a museum ran by the Department of Antiquities, another became a primary school and a third maintained the original intention as a residential building. Gidan Makama is now part of museums under management of the National Commission of Museums and Monuments and one of the old structures depicting traditional Hausa architecture. The structure originally contained mud walls typical of the Hausa tradition in that period but in later years some modern renovation work has taken place.

== Museum ==
The museum is located on Emir Palace road and it is divided into 11 galleries with each containing some aspects of traditional Kanawa artifacts, pictures, musical instruments, handicraft and materials. The galleries are the rooms and courtyards of the old Makamas and depicts the style of a traditional residence of a Kano aristocrat. The entrance of the gates exhibited some historical pots believed to have been excavated at Kofar Kabuga, a gate within the Kano city wall and also two colonial cannons. The building hosts 11 galleries.

=== Galleries ===
The museum has 11 galleries each containing materials, artifacts and pictures representing the historical heritage of the people.

- First gallery is about Hausa traditional architecture and includes building materials used by the people of Kano
- Second has the Kofar kabuga gates through which the British entered and subsequently captured Kano; it also has a map showing the walls of Kano
- Third exhibits a traditional religious history of Kano in pictures and the story of the early invaders of Kano led by Bagauda
- Fourth depicts the Fulani influenced history of Kano starting from the 19th century
- Fifth tells the story of theKano Civil war
- Sixth tells the story of old Kano economy and the Durbar
- Seventh has the colonial period and pictorial history of 20th century political figures
- Eighth includes the Islamic heritage of the people of Kano
- Ninth shows various occupations of the people of Kano and includes farm instruments, basketwork and textiles
- Tenth has music instruments
- Eleventh depicts the traditional Hausa bride's room.

Some of the historical items that are kept at Gidan Makama

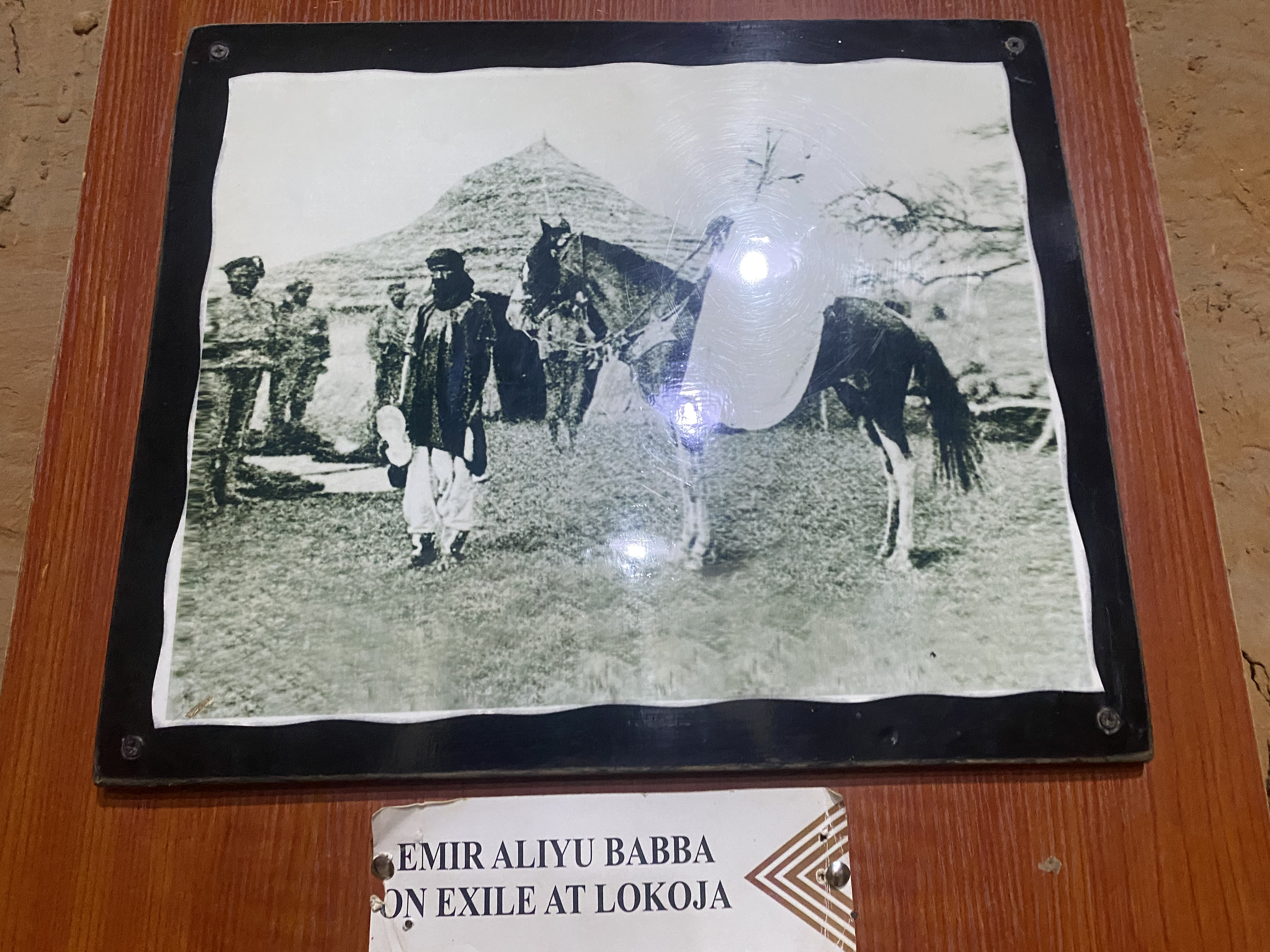

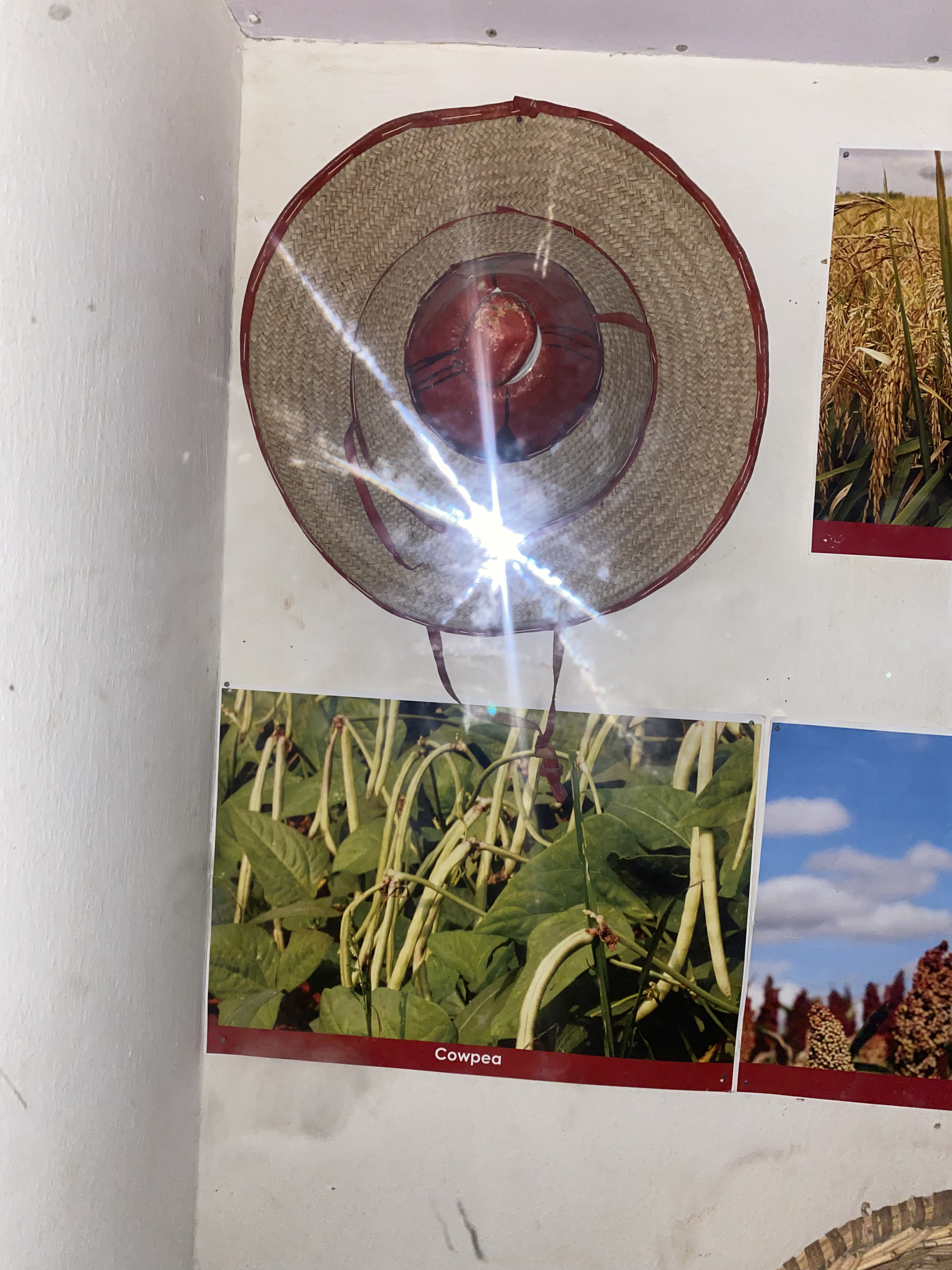

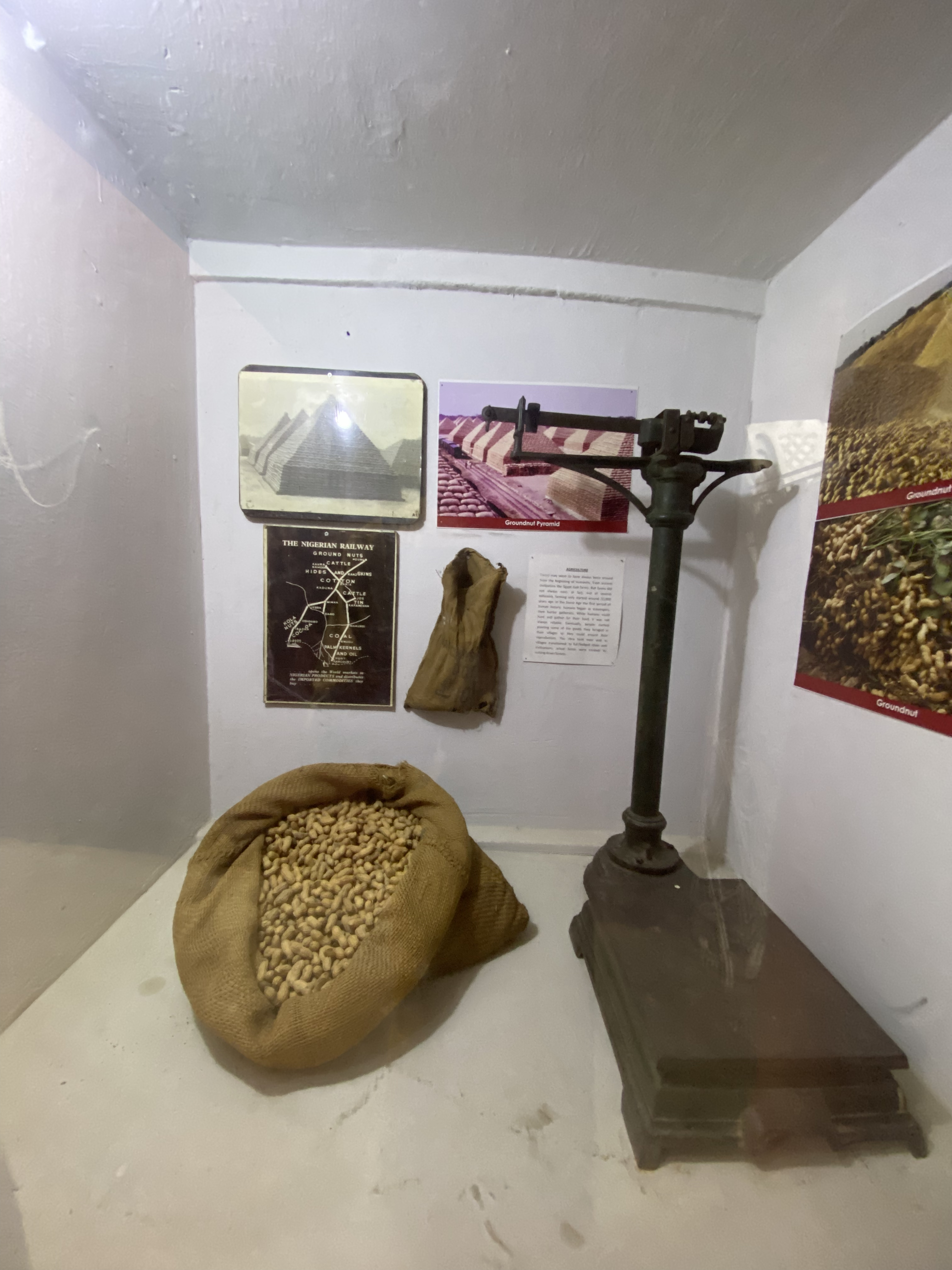

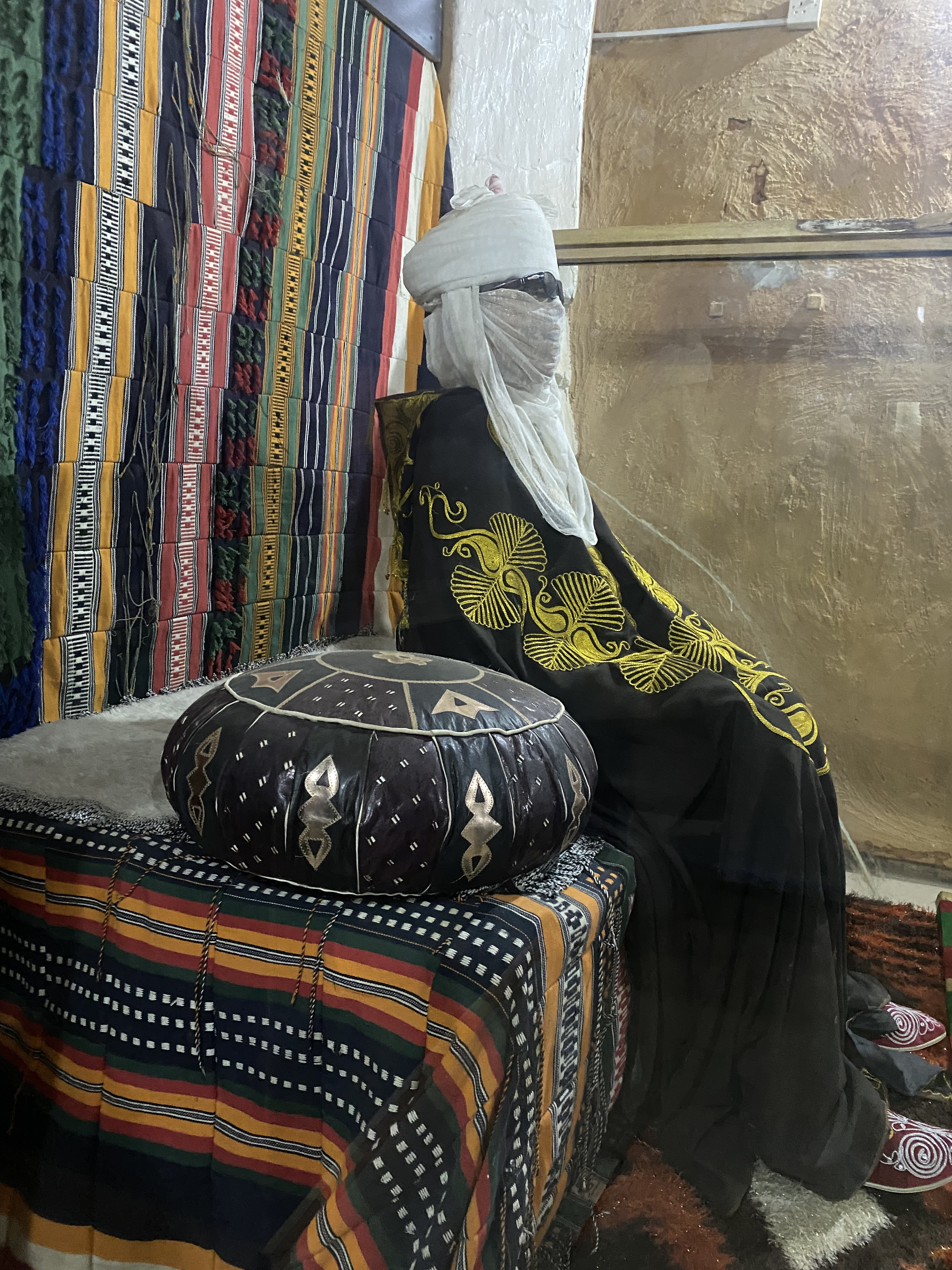

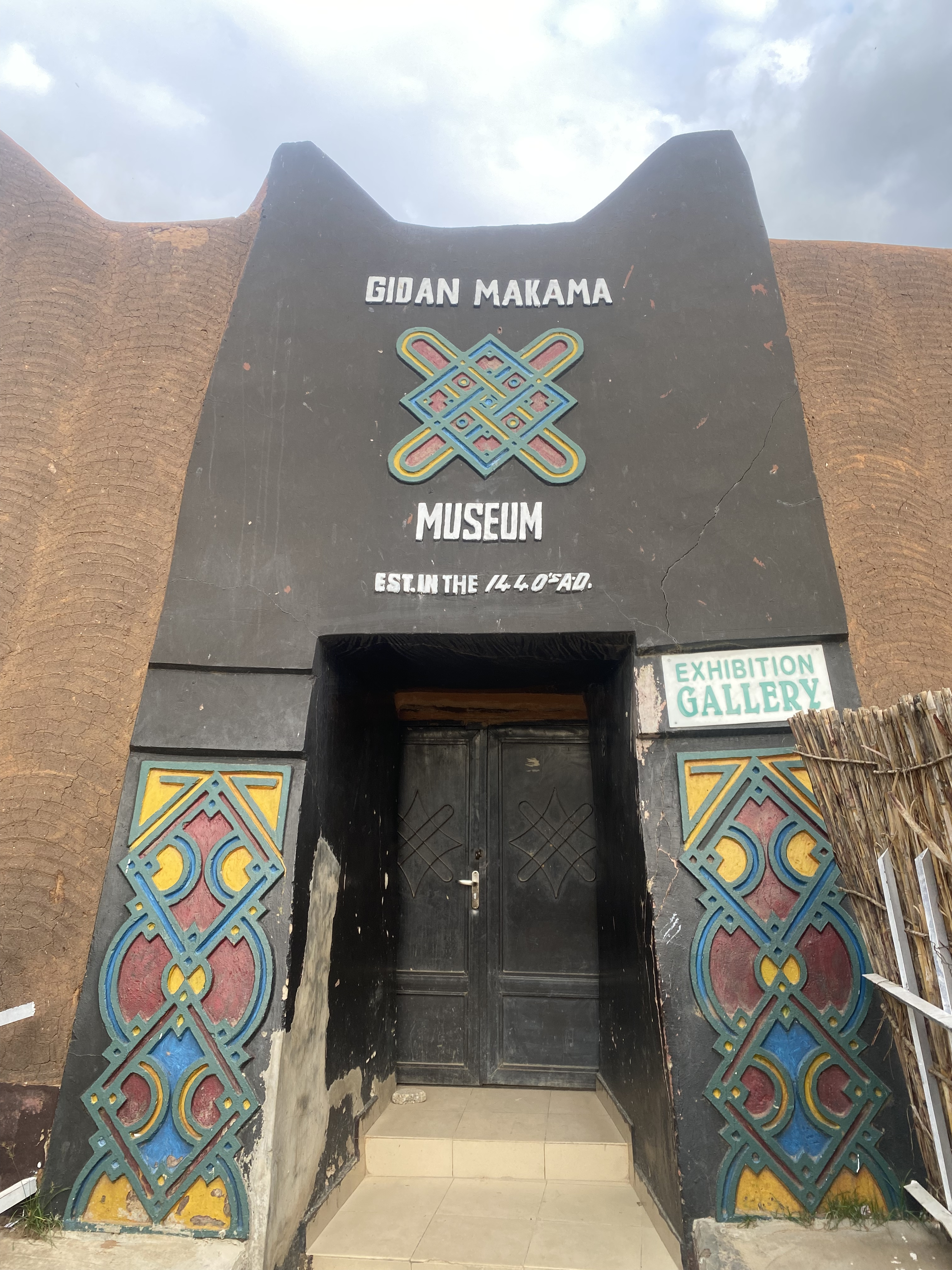

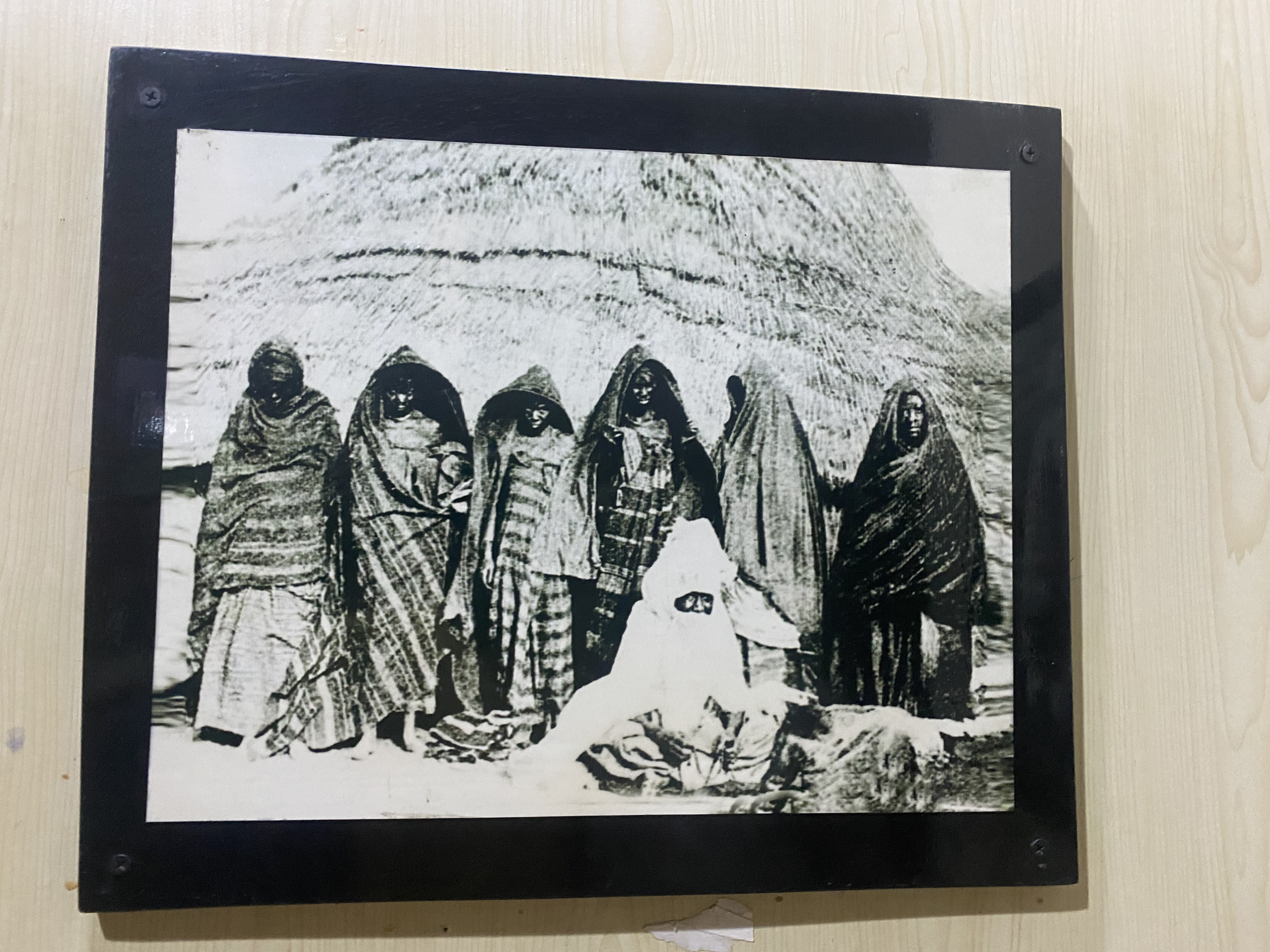

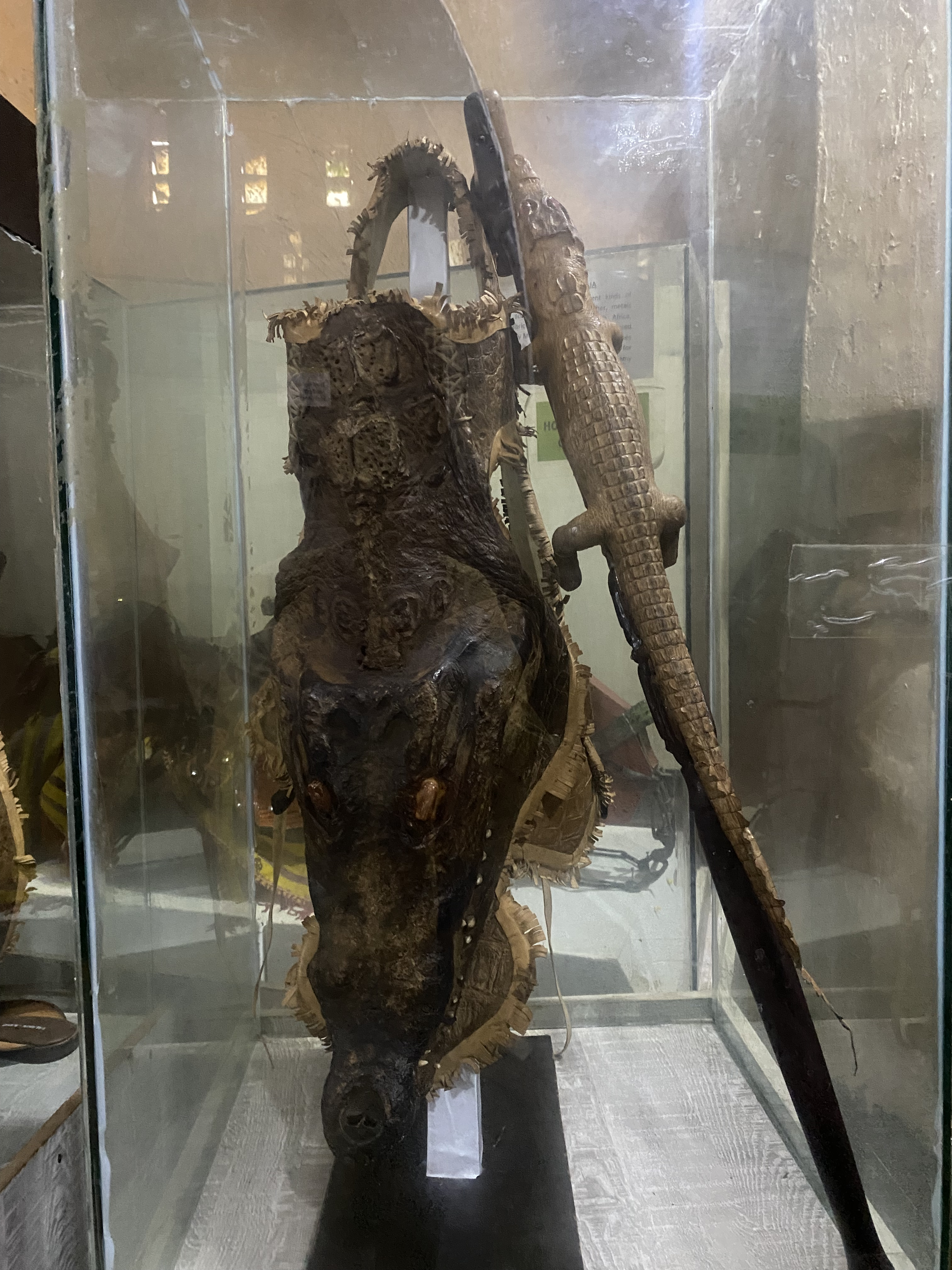

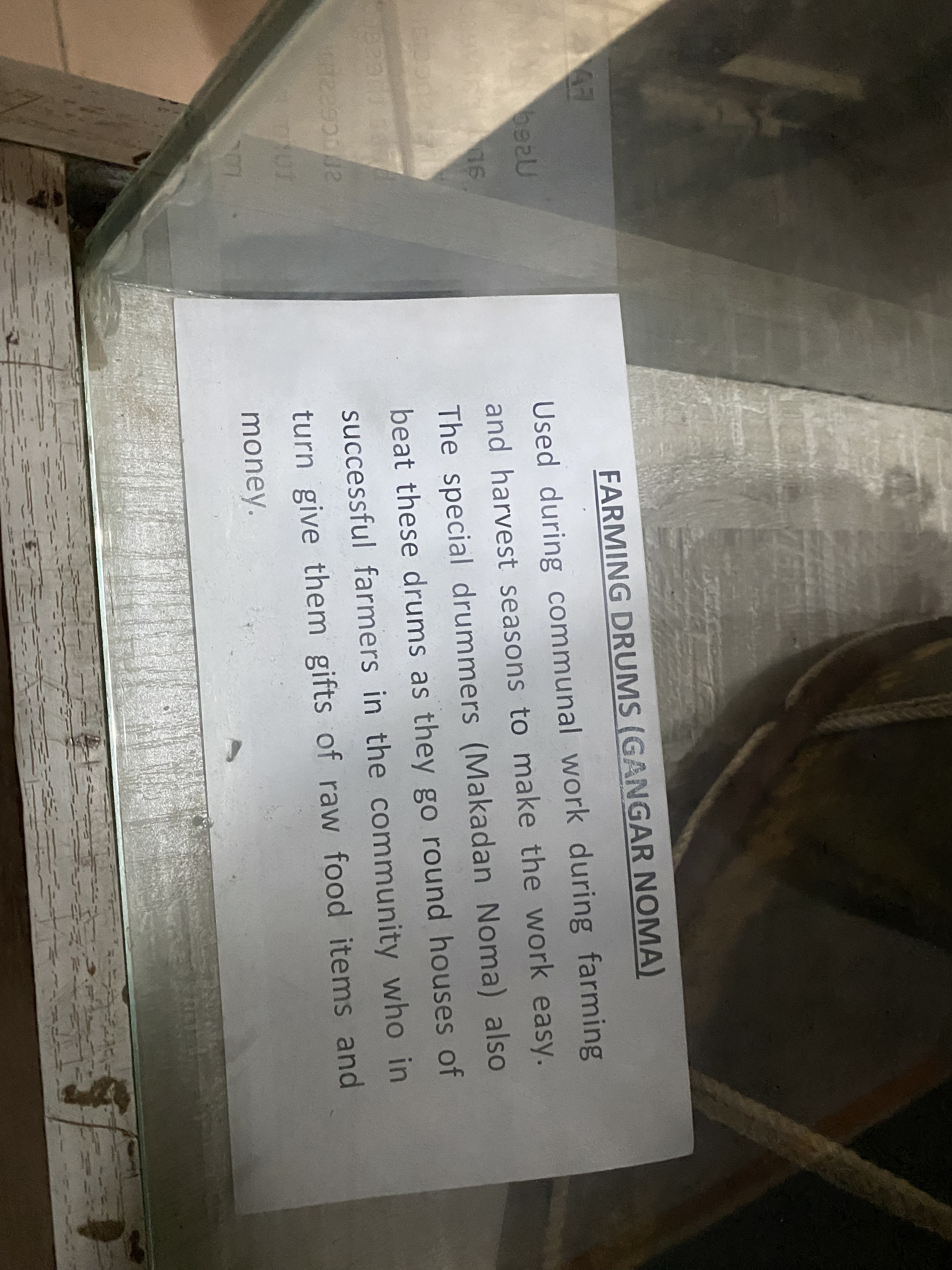

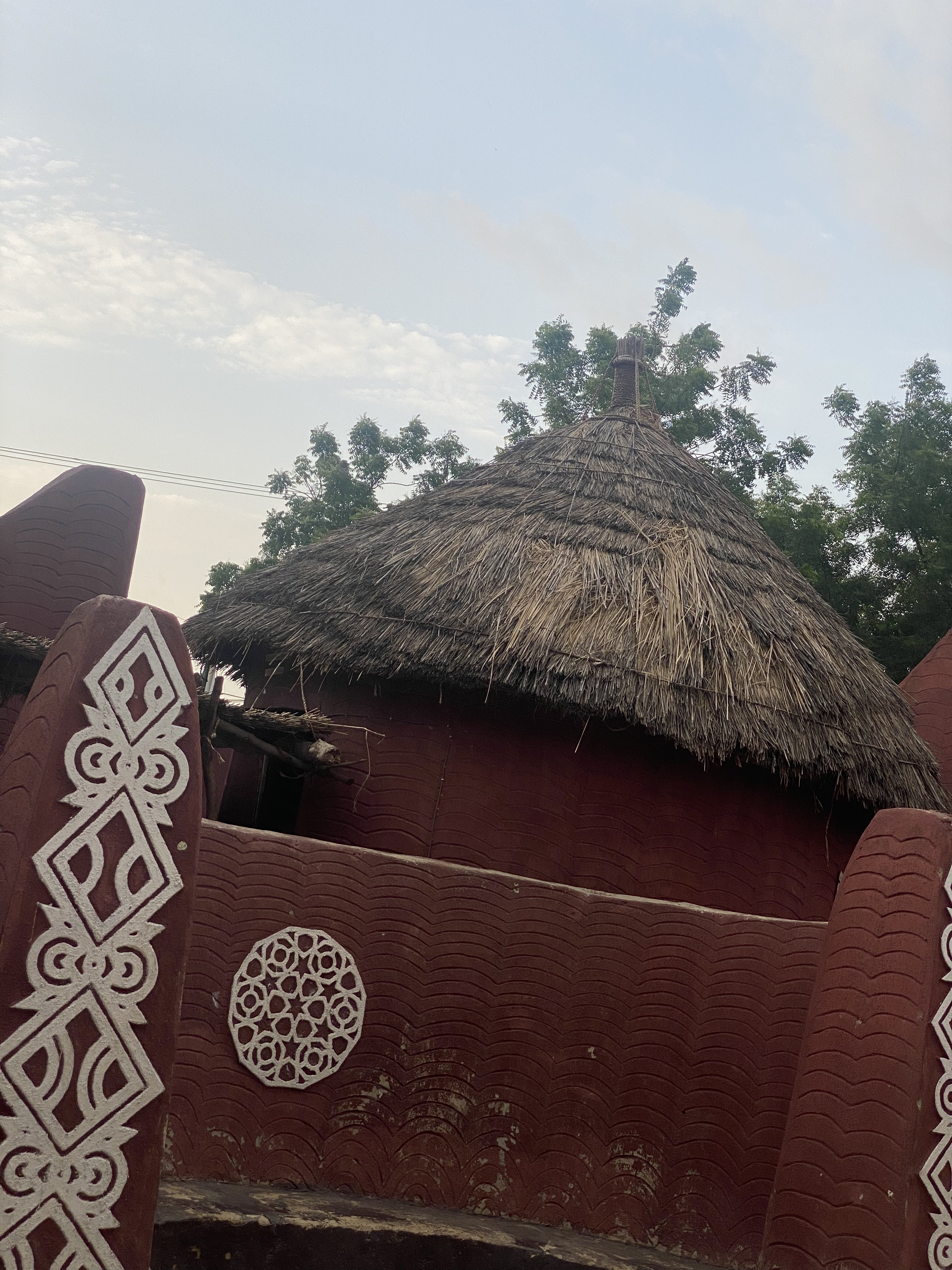

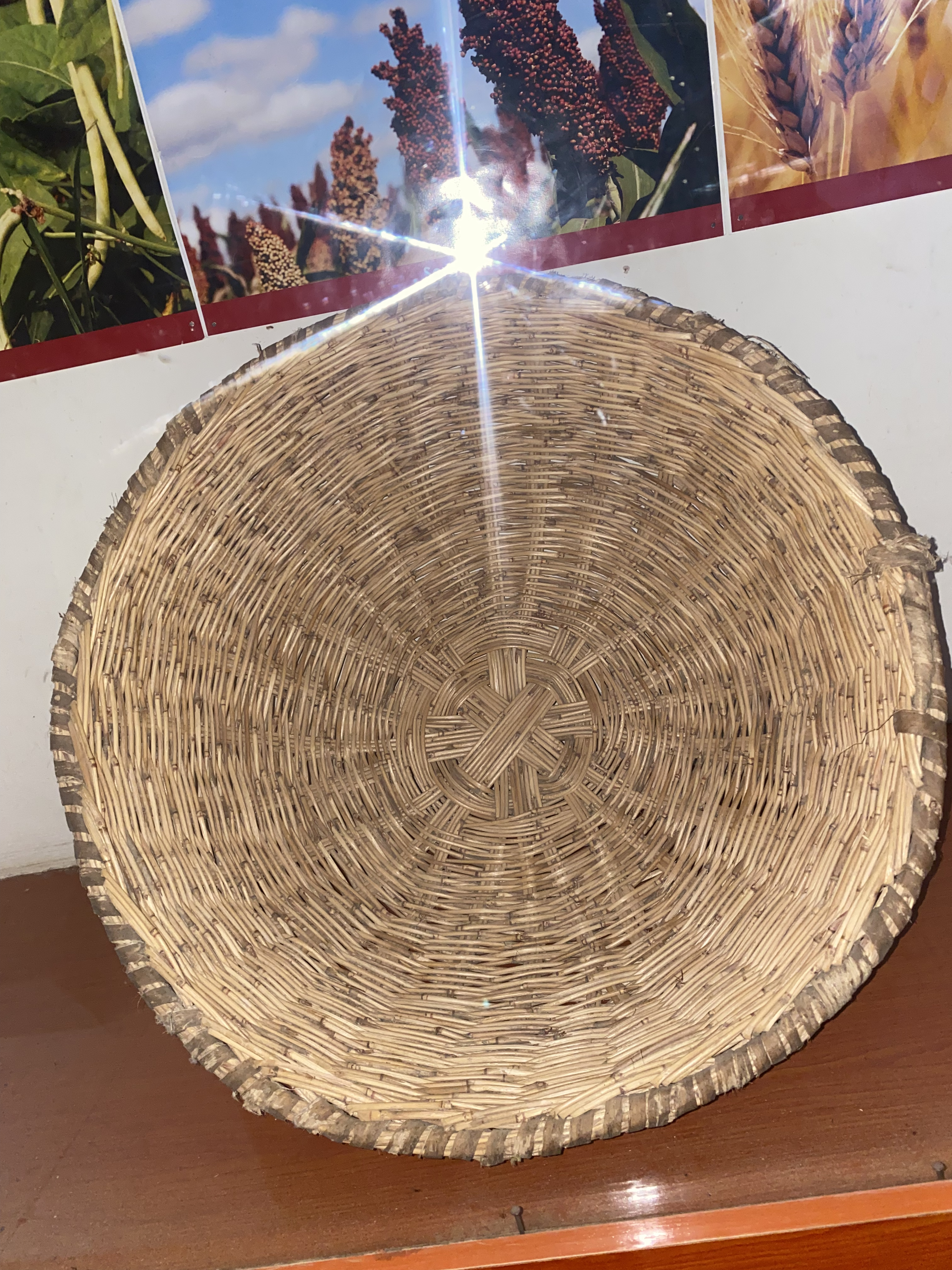

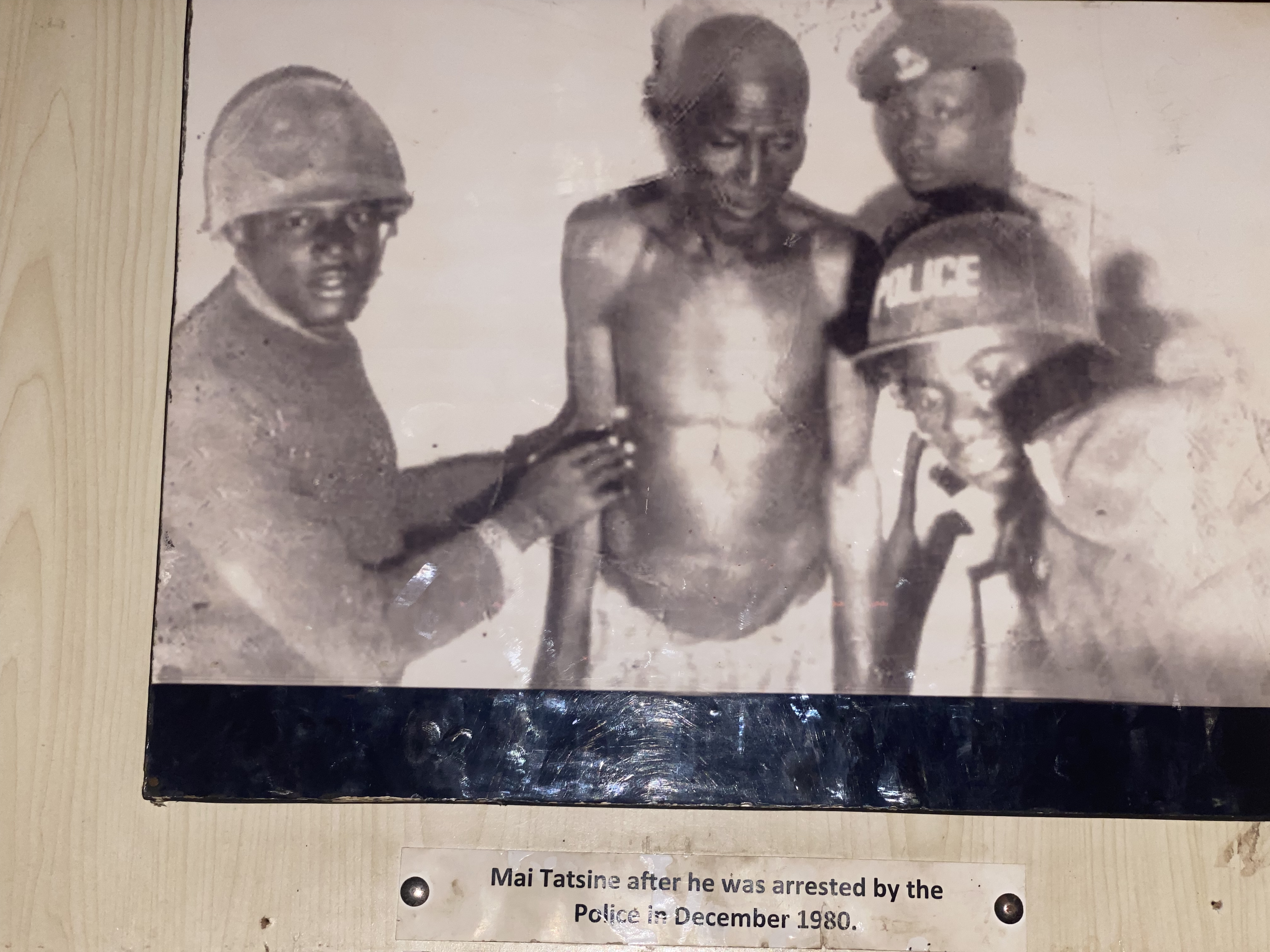
