= List of villages in Bauchi State =

Villages in Bauchi State, Nigeria

This is a list of villages and settlements in Bauchi State, Nigeria organised by local government area (LGA) and district/area (with postal codes also given).

== By Postal Code ==
| LGA | District / Area | Postal code | Villages |
|---|---|---|---|
| Alkaleri | Duguri | 743103 | Badara; Badaran Daste; Bajama; Bajoga; Bartak Duguri; Begoa; Birim; Borlobo; Dagudi; Dan; Dogon Ruwa; Duguri (Yuli); Gaji Gumu; Gayar; Gigyara; Gul; Gulum; Kafi; Kafin Madaki; Kandak; Klumkar; Kuka; Kumbala; Kumbi; Kumkar; Kumzum; Kunginbar; Kunsakal; Macido; Main a Ma`laji; Mundaniyo; Mundol; Naki Bum; Nastira; Rafawa; Rimi; Sabon Gari; Sabon jiri; Shafa; Sharam; Tawur; Tudun Wada; Twara; Wuki; Yalwan Dogo; Yalwan Duguri; Yashi; Yuli Camu |
| Alkaleri | Gwana | 743102 | Alkaleri; Bakureje; Balende; Barkeje; Bobga; Bura bayi; Digare; Digi; Futuk; Garin Bahago; Gobirawa; Gwanan Duste; Jada Mansur; Jauro Hamma; Jauro Hanza; Karenkare; Kashereyel; Kwalkal; Makama; Malam Yaya; Malla; Manaur; Murtal; Nafuta; Rahama; Wundo; Yalo; Yalon Guruza; Yalwa |
| Alkaleri | Pali | 743101 | Alkaleri; Badakoshi; Bakinkogi; Bartak Fali; Bartak Pali; Doka; Filu; Galanbi Yalwa; Gar; Gongen; Guma; Guruntun; Gwaram (OLD); Kaciciya; Kufa; Kufa Bubu; Kwaimawa; Lafiya; Mai`ari; Maimadi; Panti; Sabon Gari; Tarangadi; Tumuru; Unguwan Wako; Yala; Yolan Fali; Zange |
| Bauchi | Galambi | 740101 | Badakoshi; Balanshi; Birshi Gawdu; Bishi; Buzoye; Byara; Dindima; Doka; Dumi; Durum; Galambi; Gasgal; Geji; Gokaru; Guma; Gwaskoram; Inkil; Kangere; Kundum; Kunjinbar; Kuruwala; Kurwala; Malma; Miri; Rehu; Runde Bin; Shasawawka; Taka Lafia; Tirwun; Wuntin Ododo; Wura Wase; Yelwa; Yola Doka; Yuli |
| Bauchi | Zungur | 740102 | Barumi; Bayara; Bigi; Birshi; Birshi Gandu; Burum; Buzaye; Dandago; Din; Dulbu; Dumin Zungur; Durum; Dutse; Gakal; Galambi; Gasgol; Geji; Girshi Fulani; Gubi; Jamda; Juwara; Kuda; Kuhu; Kundak; Kungas; Kurdum; Lafiyari; Liman Katagum; Luda; Lugge; Lushi; Magas; Malmo; Migyara; Miri; Mun; Munsal; Muwsa; Natsira; Pimi; Rehu; Shadawanka; Shinga; Tundunwada; Wunti Dada; Yamrat; Yelwa; Zungur; Zungur T-wada; Zungur-Dutse |
| Bogoro | Bogoro | 741104 | Abiya; Badagari; Bala (Bala); Ball Lusa; Bar; Baram; Boi; Boloro; Bom; Bonga; Bongo; Bungu; Dashem Bamin Kogi; Dashem Yalwa; Dinki; Dinki Rimi; Dinkin Fate; Dull; Dunga; Dutsen Saki; Fulani; Gambar Lere; Gambar Sabon Layi; Garualan; Gid-Gid Hamman; Gidan Danlaji; Gizaki; Gobbiya; Gwarangah; Gyara; Jalong; Janyar; Kafin-Musa; Kijim; Kori Duwa; Kurum Dodo; Kwara; Lafiyan Sara; Luggere; Lusa; Mallar; Molmol; Naukum; Ndit; Rafin Zurfi; Rafiu; Sourr; Sum; Tadnum; Tapshin; Unglere; Unguwar Gyada; Unguwar Rimi; Vung; Yabra; Zong Dutse; Zurfi |
| Damban | Dagauda | 752102 | Arku; Banjine; Chinade; Dagada; Damo; Gadau; Gargawa; Garin Chiroma; Husami; Kwafwaf; Lailai; Luchambi; Lumbo; Manawachi; Taiyu; Yayarin Fulani; Zaura |
| Damban | Damban | 752101 | Bale; Birniwa; Carai; Catahe; Dambam; Durwari; Fagam; Gargawa; Garuza; Gurbana; Gwala; Kaderi; Kaigamari; Lelawari; Madawai Garga; Ningo; Tingariye; Wahu; Wakili; Wurobundu; Yanda; Yayari; Zaure; Zobali |
| Damban | Jalam | 752103 | Dibo; Dinchi; Dul; Janda; Nahuta; Shudi; Tudun Wada |
| Darazo | Darazo | 750106 | Badakoshi; Bali; Darazo; Fate; Gudugul; Iyaka; Ka`el; Kanya; Lafiyaru; Ligge; Pingi; Ramfa; Ruga Gwano; Shuguri'; Tsamiya; Wuro Bogga; Wuro Hirna; Yashi; Zira |
| Darazo | Gabarin | 750107 | Bula; Daburai; Dafatuwo; Gabarin; Jimin'Indabo; Kili; Ladi; Pandum'Gangalawai |
| Darazo | Gabchiyari | 750112 | Buburi; Gabchiyari; Gadon Jauri; Gandum; Kaigamari; Koli; Tabra; Tsangayari |
| Darazo | Konkiyel | 750108 | Gakkulan Audi; Jaberi; Kamaku; Konkiyel; Kwattuje; Mainari; Sabu |
| Darazo | Lago | 750109 | Bakoti; Bam; Duggiri; Gakkulan Ganuwa; Kari; Kayau; Lago; Waziri Abba |
| Darazo | Lanzai | 750115 | Dosho; Garin Abba; Lanzai; Nahutan Lanzai; Sabon Garin Lanzai; Tudun Wadan Lanzai; Yalwa |
| Darazo | Papa | 750116 | Aliya; Babayen Papa; Bagaji'Maina Jeje; Bugui; Farin Bango; Garin Abare; Garin Mailafiya; Garin Mal. Hussaini; Garin Seri; Kafiyel; Kamagari; Kanda; Korawa; Magama; Mairake; Papa; Sabon Garin Papa; Tashar Aduwa; Tashar Kurma; Tsangaya; Wuro-Dole; Zobo |
| Darazo | Sade | 750113 | Babaye; Dalagobe; Damata; Garin Manuje; Gongoro; Lemari; Sade; Tagoje; Yunbumga; Zandam |
| Darazo | Tauya | 750111 | Dayi; Dollol; Duwo; Ginaka; Gwadal; Kahun; Kuka - Biyu; Mamudu; Nahutan Darazo; Shadarki; Tauya; Tsangayari; Wuro Bundu; Wuro Tara; Yalwan Darazo; Zoro |
| Darazo | Wahu | 750114 | Baguba; Garin Lesa; Gatsanga; Gauke; Jorp; Lagon - Wahu; Magume; Nahutan Jiro; Rugar - Rafi; Sauke; Wahu |
| Darazo | Yautare | 750110 | Bagurum; Dambaji; Garin Malam Yautare; Hashimeri; Kobozo; Maluri; Malurin - Tudu; Sabon Garin Yautare; Yalwan Maluri; Yautare |
| Dass | Dass | 741101 | Bagel; Bajar; Bandas; Bangim; Baraza; Bundili; Bundot; Bununu; Dangri; Darrari; Dass Katanga; Donttel; Dott; Dumba; Durr; Gajiwel; Galo; Galtal; Garam; Lusa; Lushi; Pegin Mallam Mato; Polchi; Sabon Garin Burgel; Wandi; Zumbul Dangri |
| Itas/Gadau | Gadau | 751105 | Abbari; Ashigeri; Atawari; Babu Gudu; Babuwuri; Diga; Dunari; Gadau; Garin Buraji; Garin Malam; Gata Fowa; Kanaderi; Kashuri; Ktsinawa; Nomari; Sharifufi; Walai |
| Itas/Gadau | Itas | 751104 | Abdallawa; Arama; Bambal; Baushe; Bilkicheri; Buzawa; Dani; Dingeri; Galadimawa; Gambara; Gamsha; Gwarai; Itas; Jura; Kafata; Kafin Jaji; Kakanda; Kalagari; Magarya; Majiya; Mashema; Zongo |
| Gamawa | Gamawa | 752106 | Abusta; Adabda; Alagarne; Amarchari; Amarchiyari; Ariya'Garin Lamido Bangi; Biriri; Bitori; Bordedel; Bukurami; Bumiyami; Bundujaru; Dafsomari; Dallarin Gabas; Dallarin Yamma; Dauduri; Galjiri/Nainawa; Gamawa; Gangawa; Garin Gerumi; Gayau; Gayau Sengo; Geshi; Getattara; Gidameri; Gololo, Inkiwari; Jaberen Jauro Auta; Jadori (Karba); Jajiri; Jungudori; Kachachari; Kachallari; Kafiremi; Kaisawa Dole; Kaisawan Yamma; Kalgiri; Karganemi; Kekeno; Kogga; Kore; Kukadi; Kukayasku; Kulusku; Kuncikinni; Kundiya; Kutunas; Kwaddam; Lafiyari; Lariski; Maiduguri; Mainari; Mainari Karaguwa; Malumri; Manaba; Manawango; Meleri; Sabayo; Sabongari; Sagwai; Sansan; Supa; Tamazza; UmarriJaberen Jauro Sale |
| Gamawa | Udubo | 752107 | Agwado; Aido; Alamaiko; Alasari; Bagalu; Bagel; Bakata; Bakori; Bambureri; Banamari; Barawatari; Barkewa; Bauchiri; Bauna; Bilabirin; Biriri; Bofel; Boggajiga; Bulaudo; Buskuwa; Chaichai; Chunkani; Dagaleri; Dallari; Dallol; Dalmari; Damba; Dambayel; Danchuwa; Dankori; Dauduri; Duwaru; Fewadam'; Gadiya; Gafure; Gagarauri; Gamboru; Ganalboji; Gangaw; Ganjiri; Garin Alhaji; Garin Babale; Garin Babuga; Garin Badawai; Garin Bara; Garin Bego; Garin Bikalawa; Garin Buda; Garin Dala; Garin Galadima; Garin Gordi; Garin Ja`oji; Garin Janbiri; Garin Jaure Shehu; Garin Jauro Gashi; Garin Jauro Hamza; Garin Kerma; Garin Kure; Garin Kwano; Garin Kwasam; Garin M. Jumba; Garin Makama; Garin Makau; Garin Malam; Garin Manu Nomari; Garin Umaru Shaiya; Garin Yawaram; Garuwa; Garwa; Gassgaya; Gayawa; Geledori; Gurbana; Gurbana Majam; Guruttu; Gwarbatu; Harderi; Jadokokana; Jarmari; Jarwa; Jejiri; Jimina; Joyawo; Kachallari; Kankare; Karakafchi; Karshumma; Kasuwa; Katsimawa; Kesa; Kichakki; Kore; Kuda; Kuluwa; Kumbari; Kyaulori; Ladelade; Lariye; Lugagu; Lukkugal; Mabani; Magajeri; Majimba; Majiri; Majumba; Malamfateri; Marana; Markaderi; Mashuwa; Nahuta; Nainawa; Raga; Samo; Sara; Shalum; Shanga; Sharifuri; Shuwari; Suduwari; Taffi; Taragi; Taranka; Tarmasuwa; Tonde; Tufferi; Turakiri; Udube; Umeri; Wabu; Wailawo; Yaba; Yalwa; Yarimari; Yola; Yuri; Zawa; Zindiwa; Zumbuku |
| Ganjuwa | Ganjuwa | 742104 | Baben Kasa; Badaromo; Barkaya; Dagale; Deno; Digawa; Dugumi; Durm; Gaboin Danfulani; Gala; Gali; Ganjuwa; Gasina; Gingim; Guadrsa; Gungura; Gurzumo; Janu; Jimbinb; Kafin Luman; Kafin Madaki; Kariya; Kasuwa; Kawu; Kubi; Kumin; Kuna; Lafiya; Lago to Gabas; Lubu; Miya; Nassarawa; Siri; Siri Zuruuhu; Tafawa; Unguwan; Yali |
| Giade | Giade | 750105 | Abunari; Ahiyo; Bambiyo; Chinkani; Dingashi; Doguwa; Faguji; Gabasmawo; Galdimari; Ganduha; Ganji; Giade; Gulbun; Isawa; Jarmawo; Jawo; Jugudu; Kafin Hardo; Katamba; Kaya - Kaya; Korawa; Kurba; Lafia; Madilmo; Magarya; Mainari; Marai; Margiri; Sabon Sara; Tagwaye; Yalwa; Yandure; Zabi; Zindiri; Zirami; Zum |
| Jama'are | Dogonjeji | 751107 | Arawa; Bambasa; Dallah; Dogonjeji; Gilar; Gongo; Kira/Yalwa; Mabai; Maranji; Sabon-Kafi |
| Jama'are | Galdimari | 751109 | Baburti; Baggawo; Boddorgel; Changanawa; Galdimari; Kagadama; Kata-Kata; Sharaba |
| Jama'are | Hanafari | 751108 | Bodinga; Guda; Hanafari; Kamaku East; Kirbiti; Kwantamari; Lariye; Mafudi; Memahefta; Nafarga |
| Jama'are | Jama'are | 751106 | Abutilori; Alayyi; Arawa; Baburti; Baki; Bundiri; Burdugel; Dagahsi; Dagelji; Digiza; Dogonjeji; Fetere; G/Babani; Ganuwaji; Gerawa; Gidan Jauro Sabo; Gundumi; Hanafari; Jabori; Jafunawa; Jahuno; Jama`are; Janburi; Jogowel; Joroga; Jurara; Kabegel; Kafin Dila; Kamaku; Katirje; Katsinawa; Kayarda; Kesuwo; Koyenti; Kuduwo; Kwandawa; Kwankamari; Lariye; Mabai; Mailemo; Maimasheta; Marmanji; Pango; Rarum; Sabon Gari; Sabon Kaffi; Wamburum; Yakashi; Yangamai; Yarimari; Yola |
| Jama'are | Jurara | 751110 | Abatalori; Allah Yayi; Fetere; Garin Babani; Jurara; Kesowo; Kuduwo; Kwandawa; Nagelji; Rarum; Tuid |
| Katagum | Azare Rural | 751101 | Azare; Chara-Chara; Daramushe; Duhuwar Kura; Fatara; Gafada; Kujuru; Madangala |
| Katagum | Chinade | 751102 | Bacciri; Bulkachuwa; Busuri; Chinade; Chinkani; Dagaro; Gangai; Laimari; Madachi; Madiri; Masaku; Yayu; Yolawo; Zindi |
| Katagum | Madara | 751102 | Barkeji; Bidir; Buskuri; Dargazu; Dawo; Dugunde; Galado; Gambaki; Goronkawo; Gwasamai; Kachawun; Konkoman; Lafiya; Lariski; Lugada; Madara; Magwamshi; Ragwam; Saleri; Wuyum; Yaba |
| Kirfi | Kirfi | 743104 | Arawa; Badara; Bage; Bakginde; Balla; Bara; Beni; Boli; Bure; Cheledi; Danonguza; Dewu; wuro soyo; wuro Laila; Gaka; Baba; Kafin Maigari;Garin Giwa; Harda; Hardo Bawa; Jabba; Jada; Jimbum; Kachiyeli; Kadiya; Kafin Iya; Kalajanga; Kalamboli; Kaloma; Kanawa; Kilari; Kirfi; Kyesu; Lafiya; Shango; Sherifuri; Shongo; Shugu; Sunkani; Taure; Tubule; Wanka; Wuro Chitta; Zagaima |
| Misau | Hardawa | 750102 | Akuyam; Dunkurmi; Fulatam; Galawa; Gwaram; Hardawa; Sarma; Yayari; Yelwa; Zadawa |
| Misau | Misau | 750101 | Abbayaywo; Aftaka; Ajili; Akuyam; Arobana; Bada Koshi; Barmo; Baya Banza; Bayawo; Beti; Dagolanzai; Dallari; Danfisa; Dolama; Dunkui Ambi; Dunkurmi; Dunkwi Kasuwa; Eldewo; Farin Ruwa; Fulatan; Gainan Fulani; Galawa; Garin Boyuwa; Garin Galadiman Sarma; Garin Hausa; Garin Makera; Gaudo; Gwaram; Hardawa; Ishenu; Jabaliya; Jabdo; Jabewo; Jarkasa; Jarmari; Kachawun; Kafin Sule; Kafin Zaka; Kalala; Kamfata; Kirindi; Kwadari; Kwaftara; Madakiri; Rigar Galadima; Sarma; Tohu; Wuro Bundu; Wuro dangogo; Yelwa; Zadawa; Zindi |
| Ningi | Burra | 742102 | Agwarmaji; Andarya; Barkono; Bashe; Bingi-Labo; Bom; Burra; Dabar-Baga; Dafara; Dana; Dangarafa; Deru; Diwa; Dubure; Duwa; Fatsali; Gamadoro; Ganji; Gongola; Gwandabi; Hardo-Ori; Hayin-Doka; Jar-Gaba; Kadage; Kafin-Lemo; Kajala; Kere; Kuluki; Kumba; Kurmi; Kwangi; Limi; Madafa; Marke; Masussuka; Mazai; Panna; Parda; Rafin-Dinya; Ringiya; Rumbu; Ruwan-Dinya; Sabuwar-Kaura; Sama; Shakaleme; Shande; Shuwaki; Sunkuye; Tamba; Tara; Teri; Tilugu; Tipchi; Tudun-Jarkoya; UNG. Nabarma; UNG. Madaki; Yadagungume; Zahi; Zangai; Zur |
| Ningi | Ningi | 742101 | Agotama; Ari; Bakin-Dyutse; Bakori; Bakutumbe; Balma; Batu; Baure; Bingin-Buta; Buturi; Dankomi; Digawa; Dingis; Dogon-Maje; Dogon-Ruwa; Gadar-Maiwa; Gangara; Gardo; Gidan-Baki; Gongo; Guda; Gurduba; Gwada; Gwam; Halimbe; Hardo-Bagare; Hardo-Baso; Hardo-Wako; Iyayi; Jar-Gaba; Jata; Jigawa; Jimi; Jirgagu; Kafin-Chakuna; Kafin-Zaki; Katsinawan-Danhayi; Katsinawan-Dingis; Katsinawan-Tabula; Kawari; Kayel; Kongoro; Kujera; Kukuta; Kwalangwadi; Kyana; Lumbu; Luntun-Gabas; Luntun-Yamma; Magangara; Makanuwa; Makera; Malamawa; Mara; Marke; Mulka; Nahalo; Nasaru; Ningi; Radina; Rafin-Chiyawa; Rafin-Gora; Rakajuwa; Rakama; Rumbu; Rutai; Ruwan-Kanki; Ruwan-Maje; Sharaf; Silliya; Siri; Tabula; Tajiya; Takalafiya; Takalafiyan-Balma; Tashar-Maje; Tashar-Mangoro; Tifei-Tshohuwa; Tiffi-Sabuwa; Tsangayar-Madori; Tsangayar-Marke; Tsiro; Unguwar Dabo; Unguwar-Tudu; Waya-Kawoka; Yalwa; Zakara; Zalanga; Zazika; Zidanga; Zuwi |
| Shira | Disina | 750104 | Adamami; Alkasu; Andubun; Beli; Bono; Darajiya; Daramushe; Disina; Dushi; Gaduna; Gagidiba; Galdimariyel; Ganuwa; Goga; Gurmun; Isore; Jabbari; Jalkatari; Kafin Gara; Katabarwa; Madabi; Safuruje; Sambowal; Yakasai; Zubo |
| Shira | Shira | 750103 | Adaha; Adamami; Alkaleri; Andubun; Auyakari; Bage; Bakul; Balijan; Bangire; Beli; Bidis; Dalli; Dango; Dangwalu; Disina; Dogo Dutse; Eldewo; Faggo; Fandi; Foggo; Gagidiba; Gallamari; Gaza; Gwanawa; Isore; Jaka; Kaigama; Kakkaki; Kamaku; Kargo; Kilbori; Koli; Kudawa; Kungo; Lafiya; Lambu; Malaji; N/Tsafi; Ribvawo; Rimi; Sambawal; Sawi; Shagogo; Shatari; Shinge; Shira; Suddu; Tsafi; Tumfafi; Yalwa; Yana; Yarka; Zainabari; Zamaga; Zigau; Zubo |
| Tafawa Balewa | Bula | 741103 | Balan Bula; Bodi; Butbin; Durum; Gemkil; Gwabman Daji; Gwal Jarandi; Gwallarai; Gwardin; Jabdan; Jambil yanugan; Kumbukdi; Latbala; Mbor; Pakman; Sabon Gida; Sayawa; Ung/Magaji; Yalwan; Yola Nora |
| Tafawa Balewa | Lere | 741102 | Barkin Dari; Boto; Bulli; Burgel; Daranji; Dunga Sabo; Gambar Zugum; Gongo; Gonzi; Gori; Jigi; Kufai; Kundum; Kutaru; Kwabti; LIM; Malima; Malkwafa; Mingil; Musanyi; Nabar; Rugan Birni; Rugan Daji; Rugan Malima; Saran Kasa; Siddin Shehu; Unguwar Waje; Waptang; Wasasa; Yola Bapate; Zabir; Zari; Ziya; Zongo |
| Toro | Geji | 740110 | Biciki; Chalin Kanawa; Felun Abba; Felun Habe; Geji; Tsakanin Tafawa; Yalwan Geji; Yolan |
| Toro | Jama'a | 740104 | Cirsilla; Garin Jama`a; Kanyawaja; Rinjin Tatu; Tashan Rinji; Tashar Durumi; Wom; Zull |
| Toro | Lame | 740105 | Anguwar t; Banginale; Baradawa; Fakuru; Fatara; Gakka; Gwa Bakin Kasuwa; Gwalbanya; Jonge; Kadagen Galmade; Lame; Ruhu; Sabon Gida; Sageri; Shau; Tudun Wada |
| Toro | Mara | 740112 | Gada Biyu; Mara; Rafin Gora; Rimin Zayam; Rinjin Gingin; Sutumi; Takabundu; Toroji |
| Toro | Palama | 740111 | Buga; Dogon Dutse Maje; Dogonjeji; Durr Katanga; Gandi; Gurdum; Kufiai; Lauki; Margi; Palama; Sabon Garin Zakshi; Yalwan Bako; Yalwan Dawani; Zakshi; Zari Kwaiu; Zari Maku |
| Toro | Rahama | 740117 | Anguwar Maji; Gana; Kalgo; Kwabi; Makana; Matawai; Muntsira; Nsarawan samanja; Rahama; Samanja; Wurno |
| Toro | Rauta | 740113 | Bakin Ruwa; Filanin Kaba; Gudun; Nahutan Taba; Natsirankawo; Rauta; Runtu |
| Toro | Ribina | 740106 | Bargan Kanawa; Ganye; Gayawa; Gwalfada; Jajuwal; Karofi; Kogin Sallah; Matari; Ribina; Rinjin Gaini; Salarma; Tilabarga; Tudun wadan; Yelwan Dallaji; Zigau |
| Toro | Rishi | 740115 | Anguwar Sarkin Pawa; Dababe; Nahuta; Rishi; Sunkuye; Wundi; Zukku |
| Toro | Tama | 740118 | Bakarfa; Bangon Tama; Burku; Dinga; Guraka; Jira; Sabon garin tulu; Shibi; Shim; Tama; Taura; Tulu |
| Toro | Tilai | 740107 | Anguware; Balarabe; Bukka; Dandore; Deho; Goljodu; Kwaciyel; Kwagga; Madugu; Magama Gari; Panshanu; Polchin Kasuwa; Rinjin Mukur; Tashan Mai Allo; Tashan Mai Turare; Tukurkuju; Tulai; Yakanaji; Yaltin; Yelwa Gari |
| Toro | Tilden Fulani | 740108 | Bujiyel; Dalam Tilde; Diriko; Jaren Bauchi; Narabi; Sabon Garin Narabi; Shakuware; Tgakuwa; Tilbali; Tilden Fulani; Tumu |
| Toro | Toro | 740103 | Balo; Gwaljarandi; Kayauri; Loro; Magama Gumau; Miya Barkatai; Toro; Tudun Wada |
| Toro | Wonu | 740116 | Anguwan kadiri; Anguwan waziri; Babajayi; Badiko; Bakin Kogi; Didim; Fingel; Gumau; Gumau sanga; Gweljaule; Laru; Mara; Ririwan dalma; Sauke; Sheni; Tashan malam sale; Wonu |
| Toro | Zalau | 740114 | Chediya; Dawa; Fisha-share; Garwa; Mette; Riga; Rinjin gura; Zalau |
| Toro | Zaranda | 740109 | Balla; Bolu; Galda; Gansawa; Guggu; Jimeri; Kafin Dulumi; Kombo; Koseyal; Makera; Mundu; Nabordo; Sari; Sum; Tafawa; Takadulbi; Takandangiwa; Tashan Maikudi; Tingiltin Kanawa; Yakanaji; Yuga; Zaranda |
| Warji | Warji | 742103 | Aru; Badiyaso; Baima; Dagu; Dansai; Dawatsi; Disa; Gabanga; Ganji; Ingila; K/katanga; Katanga; Lirna`a; Marasuwa; Muda; Rumba; Shitako; Sosaye; Tudun Wada; Tuya; Warji; Yayari; Zurgwai |
| Zaki | Sakwa | 752105 | Aishi; Alangawari; Alari; Amar Mari; Anamo; Aririn Sakwa; Babbadige; Badagana; Bagalu; Bakari; Barwarin Kudu; Chibiyayi; Chirimari; Cnacharam; Dagumani; Daudiri; Daushe; Dugumani; Fagimari; Fuchukuwa; Gaguimari; Garunfaram; Gatashiya; Gumai; Gurara; Gwalalun; Jajeri; Jalkatari; Jandago; Jatauri; Jedde; Jolga; Kachan; Kadirawa; Kafin Larabawa; Kagummaje; Kameme; Kankaleri; Kauneri; Lafarmari; Lariye; Madufa; Mara; Maraba Gumai; Marakawa; Mur-Mur; Ragwaram Da`u; Ragwaram Tankwali; Sabon Garin Sakwa; Sabon Sara; Sade; SAKWA; Sandi Galau; Talbarin Bare Bari; Talbarin Fulani; Tatije; Tello; Tijjane; Zainameri; Zamaramari |
| Zaki | Zaki | 752105 | Aburbur; Adamante; Adishin; Agoguma; Agon; Agusha; Akeza; Alagarno; Alganari; Alhajeri; Amalewa; Andama; Ariri; Asake; Asurbun; Atakuya; Babuwuri; Bagam; Bakatuma; Balkiri; Barnesu; Barwari; Bima; Bindiri; Bulagana; Bulturi; Bursali; Caldimari; Dala-Dagum; Damewa; Damodi; Dasare; Daya; Disini; Dudduru; Dukawa; Dukkuri; Fiyo Fiyo; Futti'; Gadai; Gara; Garin Gami; Garin Malam; Gasakakum; Gatuma; Gauya; Gayambo; Gujarma; Gurka; Jalkatari; Jama`Aren Katagum; Jujjin; Juliahi; Jumbori; Jundu; Kadabdu; Kajawai; Karayan; Kaskindin; KATAGUM; Kirchubuwa; Kizir; Kore Mabbi; Kuduban; Kukawa; Kwayamri; Ladari; Lodiyo; Machanguwa; Mai Kore; Mainako; Mainari; Maiwa; Makawa; Makintari; Maluri; Manawaski; Mandamari; Masaje; Migiya; Nduya; Rajuwa; Sabakuwa; Sabon Gari; Saidiri; Sansan; Santalmari; Saradugum; Sutuwa; Tabbasu; Tadire; Tagoyo; Tashena; Tikirje; Tubsiga; Turari; Wareki; Wasari; Zango; Zaratku; Ziga; Zinah |

== By electoral ward ==
Below is a list of polling units, including villages and schools, organised by electoral ward.

| LGA | Ward | Polling Unit Name |
|---|---|---|
| Alkaleri | Alkaleri | Unguwar Ajiya I - Village Head Office I; Unguwar Ajiya I - Village Head Office II; Unguwar Ajiya II - Upper Area Court; Unguwar Ajiya III - Upper Area Court; Sarkin Shanu I - Viewing Centre I; Sarkin Shanu I - Viewing Centre II; Sarkin Shanu II - Central Primary School; Sarkin Shanu III - Central Primary School I; Sarkin Shanu III - Central Primary School II; Sarkin Tasha - Bayan Banki I; Sarkin Tasha - Bayan Banki II; Unguwar Baba I - Viewing Centre; Unguwar Baba II - Viewing Centre; Unguwar Baba - Blind Workshop; Unguwar Sarkin Kudu - K./ S./ Gunciguyi; Unguwar Masuri S./ S./ Masuri; Maimadiri - Maimadiri Primary School; Maimadiri II - Maimadiri Primary School; Gorondo-K/S/Gorondo; Tarangadi - Tarangadi Primary School; Kafi - Kafi Primary School; Galanwo - K./ S./ Galanwo |
| Alkaleri | Pali | Pali East - K/ S / Kwala I; Pali East - K/ S / Kwala II; Pali South East - K/ S / Kwala Babani; Unguwar Dan Lawan Pali Primary School; Gale - Gale Primary School; Sabon Gari - Sabon Gari Primary School; Lafiya - K/ S/ Lafiya; Garin Na - Allah - Garin Na-Allah Primary School I; Garin Na - Allah - Garin Na-Allah Primary School II; Pali Central - Pali Primary School I; Pali - Pali Primary School II; Garin Sarkin Ruwa - K/ S/ Kashara; Kashara - K/ S/ Kashara; Bakin Kogi - Bakin Kogi Primary School; Bambi Dawa - B./ D./ Primary School; Ranga - K./ S./ Ranga; Rangan Bonga - Kofar Fada; Doka - Doka Primary School; Buri - Buri - Kofar Fada; Yala - Kofar Fada; Potto - K./ S./ Potto |
| Alkaleri | Gar | Gar Fada - K/ F/ S/ Gar; Gar Makaranta - Gar Primary School; Gar Central - Gar Coops; Fanti Tasha I - K/ S/ Fanti I; Fanti Tasha I - K/ S/ Fanti II; Fanti Tasha II - K/ S/ Fanti; Galambi Yelwa - K/ S/ Yelwa; Bada Koshi - Bada Koshi Primary School; Monna - K/ S/ Monna; Gangar - K/ S/ Gangar; Gyangyar - K/ S/ Gyangyar; Guruntu - Guruntu Primary School; Guruntu - K/ S/ Guruntu; Bartak - Bartak Primary School |
| Alkaleri | Gwaram | Unguwar Turaki - K. M Hamma; Unguwar Baba Gamji I - Kofar Salisu; Unguwar Baba Gamji II - K. M Abdullahi; Gwaram East - Gwaram Primary School; Gwaram East Gwaram Dispensary; Gwaram West - Kofar Alhaji Bakoji; Gwaram West Kofar Alhaji Kawun Kawu; Kufa Gandu - Kofar Sarki Kufa; Kufa Shurolde - Kofar Sarki Shurolde; Kufa Jalingo - Kofar Sarki Primary School; Unguwar Chiroma - Kofar Malam Maigana; Unguwar Waziri - Gwaram Primary School; Unguwar Waziri - Kofar Sarki Yara; Gokaru East I - Gokaru Primary School; Gokaru East II - Gokaru Primary School; Gokaru West I - Gokaru Dispensary; Gokaru West I I - Gokaru Dispensary; Tafare - Kofar Sarki Tafare; Kaciciya - Kaciciya Primary School; Karshi - Kofar Sarki Karshi; Nasarawa - Kofar Sarki Nasarawa; Gyar - Gyar Primary School; Guma - Guma Primary School |
| Alkaleri | Maimadi | Maimadi Makaranta - Maimadi Primary School I; Maimadi Makaranta -Maimadi Primary School II; Kwaimawa - Kwaimawa Primary School I; Kwaimawa - Kwaimawa Primary School II; Mai Ari Arewa - K. S Mai Ari; Mai Ari Arewa - Primary School; Zadawa - K. S Zadawa; Wuro Bature - K. S Jada; Shugu - K. S Shugu; Bubu - Bubu Primary School; Bubu Kufa - K,S Kufa; Jada - K. S Jada |
| Alkaleri | Dan Kungibar | Dan Makaranta - Dan Primary School; Dan S. G Dimis - Dan Primary School; Sabon Gari - Kofar Sarki; Dagudi - Dagudi Primary School I; Dagudi - Dagudi Primary School II; Jigawa - Kofar Sarki; Kunkar - Kofar Sarki; Bakin Dutse - District Head Office; Natsira - Kofar Dan Biram; Bada Koshi - Kofar Sarki; Yalwan Duguri - Kofar Sarki; Kungibar - Junior Secondary School; Rafawa - Rafawa Primary School; Yashi - Primary School; Mainamaji - Dev. Area Office; Badara - K. S Badara; Gungu Macido - Kofar Galadima; Gale - Kofar Fada; Sangar - Kofar Fada; Kufa - Kofar Sarki Kufa; Tudun Wada - Kofar Sarki Tudun Wada |
| Alkaleri | Birin/ Gigara/ Yankari | Birim Fada - Birim Dispensary; Birim Sarki Noma - Primary School; Birim Makaranta - Primary School; Bartak - Bartak Primary School; Warkin Wuta - Kofar Sarki Warkin Wuta; Twara - Twara Primary School; Gayar - Kofar Sarki Gayar; Gayar - Gayar Primary School; Bajama - Kofar Sarki Bajama; Gwartambali - Primary School; Kunva - Primary School; Gigyara - Primary School I; Gigyara - Primary School II; Gigyara - Primary School III; Bal - Primary School; Jamda- Primary School; Baddare - Kofar Sarki; Unguwar Ajiya - Kofar Ajiya; Gwalbaji - Kofar Sarkin Gwabaji; Kwaljerendi - Kofar Sarkin Kwaljerendi; Takwur Madugu - Kofar Sarki; Jor - Jor Primary School; Yankari - Yankari Primary School |
| Alkaleri | Yuli/ Lim | Yuli Fada - Area Court; Yuli Central - Yuli Primary School; Yuli Makaranta - Yuli Primary School I; Yuli Makaranta - Yuli Primary School II; Yuli Kasuwa - Yuli Primary School III; Dogon Ruwa Ruwa - K. S Dogo Ruwa; Bogos - Kofar Sarki Bogos; Rimi - Kofar Sarki Rimi; Kafi - Tsofuwar Makaranta I; Kafi - Tsofuwar Makaranta II; Gobirawa Kofar Sarki Gobirawa; Tasamat - Kofar Jauro; Sabon Jiri Kofar Sarki; Gaji Kasuwa Dispensary; Gaji Kasuwa Kofar Jauro; Kofar Bunu Gaji Kofar Bunu; Makaranta Gaji Primary School; Gajigamu - Kofar Sarki Twonlong; Kunzu Kunzun Primary School; Kumbal Kofar Sarki Jiri; Kundak Kundak Primary School; Unguwar Baji Kofar Alhaji Baji; Gikar Gikar Primary School; Ganshiya Kofar Fada; Kumbala- Kumbala Primary School; Kunyel- Kofar Sarki Mutshak; T. Mbalalim - Primary School I; T. Mbalalim - Primary School II; Gamu - Kofar Sarki Gamu; Bala Hardo - Kofar Hardo; Taksar - Kofar Sarki Taksar; Maje - Kofar Sarki; Dagan- Kofar Sarki |
| Alkaleri | Futuk | Unguwar Jibir District Head Office I; Unguwar Jibir District Head Office II; Unguwar Jibir District Head Office III; Unguwar Jibir District Head Office IV; Unguwar Waziri - Futuk Primary School I; Unguwar Waziri - Futuk Primary School II; Garin Kayaya - Futuk Primary School; Unguwar Manu - Futuk Dispensary; Unguwar Sarkin Yaki - Kofar Jauro; Unguwar Sarkin Yamma - Walakero; Jauro Gani - Makasa; Jauro Hamma - Kofar Jauro Hamma; Fantami - Kofar Jauro Fantami; Garin Kwairi - Kofar Sarki Garin Kwairi; Kumuyel - Kofar Jauro; Jauro Hamma - Jauro Hamma Primary School I; Jauro Hamma - Jauro Hamma Primary School II; Gora - Kofar Sarki Gora; K/ Angayau - Kashereyel Primary School; Baka Manu - Kofar A. Umaru; Jauro Bunne - Jauro Bunne; Kwalkwal - Kofar Sarki Kwalkwal |
| Alkaleri | Yalo | Makasa - Makasa Primary School; Guruza - Kofan Sarki Guruza; Garin Sambo Kofar Jauro; Garin Malam - Kofar Sarki Yaki; Digare - Digare Primary School; Unguwar Galadima - Dispensary; Tudun Wada - Kofar Jauro; Unguwar Usman - Digare Primary School; Ligadi - Kofar Sarki Ligadi; Kwairanga - Kwairanga Primary School I; Kwairanga - Kwairanga Primary School II; Alkali Sule - Alkali Sule Primary School; Unguwar Yaya Nuhu - Kofar Jauro; Unguwar Yarima - Yalo Primary School; Unguwar Galadima - Yalo Primary School; Jobajo Kofar Sarki Jobajo; Wundo - Kofar Chindo |
| Alkaleri | Gwana / Mansur | Kontagora - Kotagora Primary School; Kargo - Kargo Primary School; Mansur Tsofuwa - Kofar Sarki Mansur; Mansur Sabuwa - Kofar Sarki Madaki -I; Mansur Sabuwa - Kofar Sarki- II; Jada - Kofar Jauro; Bunga - Kofar Sarki Sabuwar Bunga; Bogga - Kofar Sarki Bogga; M/ Umaru Tabani - K. M Tabani; Bakuroje - Kofar Sarki Bakuroje; Murtalan Daji - Kofar Sarki Murtala; Rahama - Kofar Sarki Rahama; Jauro Hassan - Kofar Jauro Hassan.; Kare Kare - Kasan Dare Kofar Jauro; Kare Kare Raga - Kofar Sarki Rufa; Jauro Audu - Gwana Maternity; Jauro Audu West - Kofar Sarkin Noma; Ruga Audu West - Kofar Alhaji Bello Ruga; Jauro Didji - Kofar Jauro Didji; Jauro Haruna - Kofar Jauro Haruna; Jauro Mati - Kofar Jauro Mati; Gobirawa J. B - Gobirawa Dispensary; Unguwar Sule Maigama - Gobirawa Dispensary; M/Tashan Dutse - Kofar Sarkin Masallaci; Tashan Dutse - Kofar Juli Mai Arami; Kasan Dare - Kofar Jauro; K/ Dare Danbinta - Kofar Sarki Danbinta; Jauro Dankawu - Kofar Jauro Dankawu; Jauro Na Hajja -Kofar Jauro |
| Bauchi | Majidadi 'A' | Kofar Alkali Aminu - Kofar Alkali Aminu; Kirmi Sarki - Kirmin Sarki; Kofar Iyan Gari - Kofar Gidan Iyan Gari; Kofar Alh. Yahaya - Kofar Alh. Yahaya Tuji; Kofar S. Dogari - K/S Dan S. Dogari; Kofar Savanna - K/Savanna Emirs Drive; Bakaro Primary School - Bakaro Primary School; Blind Workshop, Blind Workshop; Kofar Tafida - K/Gidan Tafida; Kofar Jabosa K/Gidan Jabosa Doya; Kofar Yarima K/Gidan Yari Doya; Blind Workshop - Kofar Yari Doya; Kofar Dangikka, Kofar Dangikka Doya; Bakaro Primary School I; Bakaro Primary School II; Gindin B/Hole – Gindin Bore Hole Doya; Town Maternity; Fadar Sarki - Fadar Sarkin Bauchi-I; Fadar Sarki - Fadar Sarkin Bauchi -II; Kofar II Maidawa - Kofar Idi Maidawa; K/Wanbai Govt. Day Sec. Sch(By Gombe Gate, By Gombe Gate I).; K/Wanbai Govt. Day Sec. Sch.(By Gombe Gate, By Gombe Gate II); K/Yakubu S. D Kofar Yakubu S. D; K/Wanbai - Kofar Wambai; K/Ahmed Natsira - K/Ahmed Natsira; K/Mijinyawa Kangyare - K/Mijinyawa Kangyare |
| Bauchi | Majidadi 'B' | K/Bauchin Bauchi, K/Bauchin Bauchi; K/Dumi Primary School I; K/Dumi Primary School II; K/Dumi Primary School III; K/ Lamaran Ibrahim; K/Malam Tukur, K/Malam Tukur; K/Sarkin Aska, K/Sarkin Aska; K/Gidan Yarima, K/Gidan Yarima; K/Shehu T. Yarima, K/Shehu T. Yarima; Kofan Alpha, Kofan Alpha; Former Garkuwa House; B/Kusurwan Fada, B/Kusurwan Fada; Kan-Kusurwan Fada, Kan-Kusurwan Fada; K/Santuraki, K/Santuraki; K/Malantu, K/Malantu; Bayan-Dutse, Bayan-Dutse; K/Ladan Hassan, K/Ladan Hassan; K/Hardo, K/Hardo I; K/Hardo, K/Hardo II; Gindin - Rimi, Gindin - Rimi; K/Simon Nagale, K/Simon Nagale; K/Mahaukata, K/Mahaukata; Prison Yard, Prison Yard; Kofa Hamidu, Kofa Hamidu; K/Yuguda-Gayya, K/Yuguda-Gayya; K/Adamu-Maihula, K/Adamu-Maihula; K/Sambo Kurma, K/Sambo Kurma; K/Yaro, K/Yaro; K/Shehu Jarumi, K/Shehu Jarumi; K/Shabana-Drive, K/Shabana-Drive; K/Adamu Cross, K/Adamu Cross; K/Masu Miya, K/Masu Miya; K/Baban Kogi, K/Baban Kogi |
| Bauchi | Makama/Sarki Baki | Gwalaga Primary School, Gwalaga Primary School; Kofar Aliyu Bununu, Kobi Quarters; Kofar Alhaji Chindo, Gwalaga; Gidan Baki, Yakubun Bauchi Road; Kofar Magajin Gari, Yakubun Bauchi Road; Kofar Chiroma Abubakar, Ganjuwa Road; Kofar Mamman Ingawa, Kofar Mamman Ingawa; Kofar Garba Toro, Ganjuwa Road; Kofar Makama, Ganjuwa Road; Kofar Gidan Haladu M. Near Wunti Market; Kofar Mai Unguwa Gwalaga, Gwalaga Ward; Kobi Primary School. Kobi Primary School. I; Kobi Primary School., Kobi Primary School II; Kofar Alti Mohammed, Kobi Street; Baballe Quarters, Kobi Street; Kofar Nassarawa Primary School, Y/Road I; Kofar Baba Katagum, Gwalaga Near Izala; Kofar Usaini Ningi, Yakubun Bauchi Road; Dagumas Block Nassarawa Gate; Kofar Nassarawa Primary School, K/Nasarawa I; Kofar Nassarawa Primary School K/ Nassarawa II; Nutrition Unit, Nasarawa/Jahun Road; Unguwar, Din Kofar Mai Unguwa; Kofar Mallam Gani, Jahun Ward; Rimin Jahun Primary School, Rimin Jahun Primary School; Jahun Primary School, Jahun Primary School I; Jahun Primary School, Jahun Primary School II; Near Maikafi House(Vp)(Makama S. B, Opp. Mai Kobi House); Rimin Jahun, Rimin Jahun Primary School; Jahun Primary School, Jahun Primary School I; Jahun Primary School, Jahun Primary School II; Behind Muri Guest Inn, Near Muri Guest Inn I; Behind Muri Guest Inn, Near Muri Guest Inn II; Under 5 Clinic, Under 5 Clinic; Kofara Wase Primary School, Kofara Wase Primary School I; Kofara Wase Primary School, Kofara Wase Primary School II; Tanshi Primary School, Tanshi Primary School; Women Centre, Women Centre I; Women Centre, Women Centre II; Unguwar Barno Primary School, Unguwar Barno I; Unguwar Barno Primary School, Unguwar Barno II; Tashin Babaye Area Court, Tashin Babaye Area Court; Rariya Primary School, Rariya Primary School I; Rariya Primary School, Rariya Primary School II; Rariya Primary School, Rariya Primary School III; Rariya Primary School, Rariya Primary School; Kanfan Makafi, Opposite T/Balewa Tomb; Kofan Idi Namisali, Opposite T/Balewa Tomb; Town Dispensary, Tashin Babaye I; Town Dispensary, Tashin Babaye II; Gidin Durumi M/Goje, Malam Goje Quarters I; Gidin Durumi M/Goje, Malam Goje Quarters II; K/S Fawa (Old) Malam Goje Quarters; Kofan S. Fawa B/Kura, Along B/Kura Road; B/Kura Women Centre, Along B/Kura Road; Dev. Area Office Former, Ibo Quarters; K/Sarkin Fawa, Along B/Kura Road; Kofar S/Kasuwa, Opposite Central Market; Babasidi Primary School, Babasidi Primary School I; Babasidi Primary School, Babasidi Primary School II; Kofar Alhaji Muhammadu Gogesu, B/Ishiyaka Jibrin; Kofar Sule Baban Ya, Behind Stadium; Kofar Kani Makanike, Wunti Street; Kofar Maigari Aminu, Aminu Street; Kofar Sani Makanike, Igbo Quarters; Kofar Aishatu, Near Gaya Lodge; Kofar Wakilin Doka, Opposite Old Cemetery; David Jajas House, Behind Old Cemetery; Kofar Maimako, Sabuwar Kasuwa; Kofar Nuhu Marafa, Sabuwar Kasuwa; Kofar Malam Kawu, Behind Muri Guest Inn; Kofar Malam Ladan, After Muri Guest Inn; M & J Maternity, Behind Unguwar Barno Primary; Kofar Mai Unguwa Adamu, Jahun Road I; Kofar Mai Unguwa Adamu, Jahun Road II; Gindin Durumi/Jahun/Nassawa Jahon |
| Bauchi | Zungur/Liman Katagum | District Head Office, District Head Office; Unguwan Chiroma, Unguwan Chiroma; Kwanyi, Kwanyi; Liman Katagum Primary School, Liman Katagum Primary School A'; Liman Katagum Primary School, Liman Katagum Primary School B'; Town Maternity, Town Maternity; Badagari, Badagari Primary School; Galambi, Galambi; Bor, Bor; Mararraban Jir, Mararraban L/Katagum; Jamda, Jamda; Lundur, Lundur; Zungur Primary School, Zungur Primary School; Zungur B. Kasuwa; Bagum, Bagum; Balalusa, Balalusa; Gungu, Gungu; Tamungas, Tamungas; Fulanin Kaba, Fulanin Kaba; Zungur Dutse Primary School, Zungur Dutse Primary School; Kumbukdi, Kumbukdi; Bakwan, Bakwan; Kunzugurum, Kunzugurum; Fonga, Fonga; Kusada North, Kusada North; Targar Kanawa, Targar Kanawa; Din, Din; Yola, Yola Primary School; Gurel, Gurel; Tudun Wada Primary School, Tudun Wada Primary School; Unguwar Tunku, Unguwar Tunku; Gangu Primary School, Gangu Primary School; Gas, Gas; Bandas, Bandas; Unguwar Makama, Unguwar Makama; Unguwar Falke, Unguwar Falke; Giraka, Giraka; Badas, Badas; S/G/Garkuwa, S/G/Garkuwa Primary School; Targar Fulani, Targar Fulani; Burum, Burum |
| Bauchi | Mun/Munsal | Badakoshi, Badakoshi; Busala, Busala; Alkaleri, Alkaleri; Juwara Primary School, Juwara Primary School; Kanawa, Kanawa; Gosun, Gosun; Gwalam, Gwalam; Gwambe, Gwambe; Juwara Maternity, Juwara Maternity; Wuro Mayo, Wuro Mayo; Wuro Jamel, Wuro Jamel; Dali, Dali; Mun Hayi, Mun Hayi; Dungel, Dungel; Gwaramba, Gwaramba; Shingen Sarkin Yaki, Shingen Sarkin Yaki; Rugan Gindau, Rugan Gindau; Rugan Magaji, Rugan Magaji; Yola Doka Primary School, Yola Doka Primary School; Yola Doka Maternity, Yola Doka Maternity; T/W/Galadima, T/W/Galadima; Unguwar Barde D., Unguwar Barde; Bakin Kogi, Bakin Kogi; Wuro Masu, Wuro Masu; Giliri, Giliri; Kadaran Wanbai, Kadaran Wanbai; Bantale, Bantale; Gaftan, Gaftan; Bajama, Bajama; Munsal, Munsal; Unguwar Makera, Kofar Sarki; Unguwar Rama, Kofar Sarki |
| Bauchi | Dandango/Yamrat | Dandango, Dandango; Sabongari, Sabongari; Gwallaga Bigi, Gwallaga Bigi Primary School; Bigi Primary School, Bigi Primary Schoo; T/Wadan Bigi, Kofar Sarki; Gudum Maternity, Gudum Maternity; Kirban Gabut, Kirban Gabut; Jagur Primary School, Jagur Primary School; Bajalli, Bajalli; Babar, Babar; Talankasa, Talankasa; Yar Borno, Yar Borno; Bagala, Bagala; Hausawa Yamrat, Hausawa Yamrat; Balar, Balar; Sabo Gari, Sabo Gari; Mangas, Mangas Primary School; Kofar Sarkin Yamma, Kofar Sarkin Yamma; Lekka Primary School, Lekka Primary School; Kanawan Yamrat, Kanawan Yamrat; Basi, Basi Primary School; Golshir, Golshir; Don Jarawa, Don Jarawa; Rugangindau, Rugangindau; Koban, Koban; Luda, Luda Primary School; Bakin Kogi, Bakin Kogi; Wuro Tafawa, Wuro Tafawa; Pasha, Pasha; Milir, Milir; Tashan Makera, Tashan Makera; Kungas, Kungas; Badakoshi, Badakoshi; Gakal Primary School, Gakal; Gakal /Unguwar Layi, Gakal /Unguwar Layi; Fim Village, Fim Village; Hammadada, Hammadada Primary School; Lobel, Lobel; Gorun, Kofar Sarki Gorun; Birnin Ganye, Birnin Ganye; Baluwa, Baluwa; Bangal, Bangal |
| Bauchi | Birshi/Miri | Baban Takko Poultry Yelwan Tudu I; Baban Takko Poultry Yelwan Tudu II; Opp. Rev Dauda Dabara, Yelwa Tudu I; Opp. Rev Dauda Dabara, Yelwa Tudu II; Kofar Sarkin Fawa I; Kofar Sarkin Fawa II; Lushi, Lushi Primary School; Kofan S. Kusu, Kofan S. Kusu I; Kofan S. Kusu, Kofan S. Kusu II; Sabon Kaura, Sabon Kaura; B. T. C., B. T. C. Primary School; A. T. B. U., A. T. B. U. Campus I; A. T. B. U., A. T. B. U. Campus II; B. T. C. B. T. C. Primary School; Kofan Sarkin Yalwa; Birshi Gandu, Birshi Gandu; Gwallameji, Gwallameji - I; Gwallameji, Gwallameji - II; Rafin Zurfi, Habila Zaki; Federal Poly, Federal Poly; Birshin Fulani, Birshin Fulani; Woro Gobbo, Woro Gobbo; Unguwar Kanawa, Unguwar Kanawa; Kuluntu, Kuluntu; Yola, Yola; Bayara Mission, Bayara Primary School; Bayara Gari, Bayara Gari; Baram, K/S Baram; Baban Buli/Kangar, Baban Buli/Kangar; Lugge, Lugge; Dokan Lugge, Dokan Lugge; Kadage, Kadage Shed; Kumbuli, Kumbuli; Miri, Miri Primary School; Banshi Banshi; Gonli, Gonli Primary School; Wuntin Dada, Wuntin Dada Primary School; Gejin Bauchi; Unguwar Hardo, Unguwar Hardo; Rugan Jauro, Rugan Jauro; Dutsen Gora, Dutsen Gora; Rambaya, Rambaya; Shadawanka, Shadawanka; Unguwar Kasa, Unguwar Kasa; Guru/R/Sanyi, Guru/R/Sanyi; Buzaye, Buzaye Primary School; Zamfara, Zamfara; Barnawa, Barnawa; Yalwan Mutari, Yalwan Mutari; Unguwar Sarkin Yaki, Unguwar Sarkin Yaki |
| Bauchi | Kundum/Durum | Durum Fulani, Primary School I; Durum Fulani, Primary School II; Sakarumbu, Illiti K. Sarki; Natsira, Kofar Sarkin Natsira; Yalwan Kundum, Kofar Sarkin Yalwa; Kundum Pilim; Gubi Fulani, Gubi Primary School; Kugi, Kugi Primary School; Gubi Dutse, Kofar Sarkin Gubi; Kuhu, Kofar Sarkin Kuhu; Jauro Ma'Aji, Jauro Ma'Aji; Gwamma, Kofar Sarkin Gwamma; Jangwali, Kofar Sarkin Jangwali; Kendo, Kofar Sarkin Summu; Summu/M, Kofar Sarkin Summu; Dumin Zungur, Kofar Sarkin Dumi; Manu/G, Manu; Kafin Yarima, Kofar Sarkin Kafin Yarima; Badagerum, Gerum |
| Bauchi | Kangyare/Turwun | Fadan Jaku, Shed; Sala Shed; Kofar Sarkin Yara, Ruga; Jauro Jaku, Y. L. Shed; Beru, K/S/ Beru; Natsira, Natsira Shed; Kanyallo, Kanyallo Shed; Balanshi, Balanshi P/B; Gwarbilli, Gwarbilli; Kangere Primary School, Kangere P/B; Bagali, Bagali Shed; Bamanu, Bamanu Shed; Bishi K. S. K. S. Bishi; Badenga Badenga Shed; Fadan Guruntum, Gurumtu Shed; Runde, Runde Shed; Kofar Garkuwa, Tafawa; Tirwun Primary School, Tirwun-Pub-Build; Unguwar Galadima, Tirwun Shed; Rafinmakaranta, Rafinmakaranta Shed; Unguwan Ajiya, Tirwun Shed; Bojinji, Bojinji Shed; Yalwan Angas, Inkil Shed; Dumi Primary School Dumi Pub. Buld; Runde-Bin, Runde-Bin Shed; Waya, Waya Shed; Inkil Primary School, Inkil Pub-Build; Gudum Saya, Gudum Sayawa Shed; Ibrahim Bako, Ibrahim Bako; Unguwar Hardo, Rusa Shed; Kimni, Kimni Shed; Zaila, Zaila Shed; Gilliri, Gilliri Shed; Gudum Fulani, Gudum Fulani Shed; Zanguwa, Zanguwa Shed; Habu, Habu Shed; Galawa, Galawa Shed; Takalafiya, Takalafiya Shed; Gabiri, Gabiri Shed |
| Bauchi | Galambi/Gwaskwaram | Galambi Dispensary, Galambi Pub-Build; Ranga, Ranga Shed; Dindinma, Dindinma Pub-Build; Runga Kela, Runga Kela Shed; Kofar Sarkin Yalwa, Kofar Sarkin Yalwa; Shafan Makaranta; Kurwala Manfani, Kurwala; Shafan Kurwala, Shafan Kurwala; Shafan Dambo, Shafan Dambo Pub-Build; Jalingo, Jalingo Pub-Build; Badakoshin Bura, Badakoshin Bura Shed; Pau, Pau Shed; Kwagal, Kwagal Shed; Kadara, Kadara Shed; Jamfalam, Jamfalam Shed; Kofar Sarkin Katsalle, Kofar Sarkin Katsalle; Yola, Yola Shed; Gwaskwaram, Gwaskwaram Shed; Luti, Luti Shed; Unguwar Makama, Unguwar Makama; Wuro Beji, Wuro Beji Shed; Wuro Diri, Wuro Diri Shed; Mongol Bakal Shed; Dinsin, Dinsin Shed; Tudon Gelen, Tudon Gelen Shed; Buta Kangal, Gidirgi Shed; Ungwar Dashi, Ungwar Dashi; Jitar, Jitar Shed; Gasgal North, Gaskal Shed; Mushak, Mushak Shed; Gibut, Gibut Shed; Dagum Dagum Public Building |
| Bauchi | Dan'Iya Hardo | Local Government Complex, Local Government Complex; Fada Primary School, Fada Primary School I; Fada Primary School, Fada Primary School II; Kofar Sarkin Rakuma, Shade I; Kofar Sarkin Rakuma, Shade II; Kofar Master Of Arts, Kofar Master Of Arts; Kofar Magajin Rafi, Kofar Magajin Rafi; Kofar Dan Sokoto, Kofar Dan Sokoto; Unguwar Jaki Area Court, Unguwar Jaki Area Court I; Unguwar Jaki Area Court, Unguwar Jaki Area Court II; Kofar Sarkin Wai, Kofar Sarkin Wai; Kofar Wakilin Auduga, Kofar Wakilin Auduga; Kofar Jibrin Jiya, Kofar Jibrin Jiya; Kofar Malam Mai Bulala, Kofar Malam Mai Bulala; Unguwar Jaki Area Court, Unguwar Jaki Area Court; Kobi Football Pitch, Kobi Football Pitch I; Kobi Football Pitch, Kobi Football Pitch II; Kofar Alh. Shehu Mai Geran Geran; Sa'Adu Zungur Primary School, Sa'Adu Zungur Primary School I; Sa'Adu Zungur Primary School, Sa'Adu Zungur Primary School II; Sa'Adu Zungur Primary School, Sa'Adu Zungur Primary School; Makama Development Area, Makama Development Area; Opp. Winniee 'A' K/Shaguna(Winniee'A' Former Winnie 'A'); Kofar Jibir Ghani, Kofar Jibir Ghani; State Hotel, State Hote; Jibril Aminu Primary School, Jibril Aminu Primary School; Gra G/Lele House, Gra G/Lele House; Opposite Bauchi Club, Opposite Bauchi Club I; Opposite Bauchi Club, Opposite Bauchi Club II; Shehu Azare Park/ Lv, Shehu Azare Park/ Lv; Federal Low Cost Houses, Federal Low Cost Houses I; Federal Low Cost Houses, Federal Low Cost Houses II; Police Centre; Zango Village, Zango Village; Government Day Secondary School, Government Day Secondary School; Command Day Secondary School, Command Day Secondary School; Army Children School, Army Children School; Railway Staff Quarters, Railway Staff Quarters I; Railway Staff Quarters, Railway Staff Quarters II; Railway Foot Ball Ground, Railway Foot Ball Ground I; Railway Foot Ball Ground, Railway Foot Ball Ground II; Police Centre, Police Centre; Inspectors Mess, Inspectors Mess; Opposite Federal Polytechnic Staff School, Opposite Federal Polytechnic Staff School; Kofar Rev. Yakubu, Kofar Rev. Yakubu I; Kofar Rev. Yakubu, Kofar Rev. Yakubu II; School Of Nursing, School Of Nursing; Doctors Quarters, Doctors Quarters; Hospital Junior Staff Quarters, Hospital Junior Staff Quarters; El - Duniya Hoptel, El - Duniya Hoptel; Lido Hotel, Lido Hotel; Magaman Tudun Wada, Magaman Tudun Wada; Bacas, Bacas I; Bacas, Bacas II; Nursing Quarters, Nursing Quarters; Fariah Foundation, Fariah Foundation; Atbu Housing Estate, Atbu Housing Estate; Youth Centre, Youth Centre; Jos Motor Park (Former), Jos Motor Park (Former); Kofar Marafa, Kofar Marafa; Tropical, Tropical; New State, New State I; New State, New State II |
| Bauchi | Dawaki | B/Mutum, Primary School I; B/Mutum, Primary School II; B/Mutum, Primary School III; K/Yayan Makaranta, K/Yayan Makaranta; Kofan Babaji M. Gero, Kofan Babaji M. Gero; K/Sarkin Ruwa, K/Sarkin Ruwa; K/Barayan D. Mowa, K/Barayan D. Mowa; Kofar Ajiya, Kofar Ajiya; Kofan Baban Keke, Kofan Baban Keke; K/A. Shehu Adamu, K/A. Shehu Adamu; Gindindurumi, Gindindurumi; K/Bello A. Residence, K/Bello A. Residence; K/Malam Nakofa, K/Malam Nakofa I; K/Malam Nakofa, K/Malam Nakofa II; Zannuwa Primary School, Zannuwa Primary School; B/Mutum Primary School, B/Mutum Primary School; G/Mangoro, G/Mangoro; K/Bukar Bugarma, K/Bukar Bugarma; Kofar Waziri, Kofar Waziri; Kamfan Lala, Kamfan Lala; K/Malam Bajoga, K/Malam Bajoga; K/Yunusa Mai Manja, K/Yunusa Mai Manja; K/Dawaki, K/Dawaki; K/Barebari, K/Barebari; K/Musa Bauchi, K/Musa Bauchi; K/S/ Makafi, K/S/ Makafi; K/S/ Bindiga, K/S/ Bindiga; K/M/ Jagaba, K/M/ Jagaba; Zannuwa Primary School, Zannuwa Primary School I; Zannuwa Primary School, Zannuwa Primary School II; Veterinary Office, Veterinary Office I; Veterinary Office, Veterinary Office II; Kofan Baban Keke |
| Bogoro | Bogoro A' | Yabra/Sabo/Y/Simi, Primary School I; Yabra/Sabo/Y/Simi Primary School II; D/Fate/D/Rimi -D/Rimi, Primary School; Dutsen Sarki/D/Lawan, Primary School; Dutsen Sarki - D/Sarki, Primary School; Sang Dutse/Bunguru Primary School; Bazanshi - Bazanshi, Primary School; Maryam Giji -M/Giji, Primary School I; Maryam Giji -M. Giji, Primary School II |
| Bogoro | Bogoro B' | Gobbiya Kasuwa, Gobiya Primary School I; Gobbiya Kasuwa Gobiya Primary School II; Garlang Ngshak/Kofar Sarki; Kafin Musa, Kafin Musa Primary School; Gizum/Dundu, Gizum Primary; Kazar, Kazar/Sarki |
| Bogoro | Bogoro C' | Bamshi, Bamshi Area Court I; Bamshi, Bamshi Area Court II; Bom Primary School; Yola, K/Sarki; Sarkin Kudu, Primary School; Kurum Dodo, Primary School; Gwaranga, Gwaranga Primary School; Sarauta, K/Sarki |
| Bogoro | Bogoro D' | Bar Arewa, Bar Primary School; Mwari Jigawa, Mwari Primary School; Kufaid/Gagara, Dink Primary School; L. Sara/Ung. Galadima, Primary School; Abuja - Abuja, Primary School I; Barkudu Primary School; Sum Dalanga-Sum Primary School; Mallar Giji/H., Daji - Mallar |
| Bogoro | B O I A' | Dazara/Ung. Rimi, Ung. Rimi Primary School I; Dazara/Ung. Rimi Ung. Rimi Primary School II; Gyaran Giji/Muntsira, Primary School; Gyaran Jeji/T/Wada, Primary School; Murai/Gul, K/Sarki Gul |
| Bogoro | B O I B' | Tsarkin/Dutse Boi, Primary School; Gijim - Gijim, Primary School; Dashan Yalwa, Dashan Primary School; Ndukum, Primary School I; Ndukum, Primary School II; Vung, Vung Primary School; Jangyar, Primary School; Dashen Yelwa, K/Sarki |
| Bogoro | B O I C' | Gambar Lugum, G/2 Primary School; Yangal/Kwablang, Primary School; Ung/Waji/Dambur/Sum, Primary School; Gambar Lere, Primary School I; Gambar Lere, Primary School II |
| Bogoro | Lusa A' | Banram Kayarda Primary School I; Banram Kayarda Primary School II; Tadnum, Tadnum Primary School; Zakkam/Bulkum/Kabbar, Primary School; Ndukum/Yin Primary School.; Sur, K/S/Sur; Gal/Kurak, K/S/Gal; Jigawa, Jigawa Primary School |
| Bogoro | Lusa B' | Lusa Arewa, Lusa Primary School I; Lusa Arewa, Lusa Primary School II; Dunga/Kwaskwa, F/Kabba; Dunga Galadima, Dunga Primary School; Kwablang, Kwanlang Primary School; Rafin Zurfi, Rafin Zurfi Primary School; Mball, Mball Primary School |
| Bogoro | Lusa C' | Gizaki, Gizaki Primary School I; Gizaki, Gizaki Primary School II; Badagari, Badagari Primary School; Ndit, Ndit Primary School; Mol Mol, Mol Mol Primary School; Bugum, Bugum Primary School |
| Dambam | Garuza | Garuza Primary School, Garuza; Kofar J/K Hassan, Jauro K. Hassan; Wahu Primary School, Wahu I; Kofar Fada, Bidir; Wahu Primary School, Wahu II; Kofar Jauro, Jauro Gatago; Ningo Primary School, Ningo; Wahu Primary School, Wahu III; Kofar Jauro, Dallari; Garai Primary School, Z. Garai; Kofar Jauro, Garin Wakili |
| Dambam | Gurbana | Gurbana Primary School, Gurbana; Kofan Gidan Yusuf, Garin Yusuf; Kofan Gidan Bako, Garin Bako; Kofan Ganjuwa, Ganjuwa; Kofan Kadiri, Kadiri; Kofan Zikidiri, Zikidiri; Kofan Tingariye, Zindi Tingariye; Kofan Gwala, Z. Gwala; Kofar Jauro, Wuro Bundu; Durwari Primary School, Durwari; Madawai Primary School, Madawai Garga; Bulus Primary School, Bulus; Muzuwa Primary School, Muzuwa; Duma Primary School, Duma; Madawai Primary School, Madawai; M. Batamuka Primary School, Batamuka; Kofan Jauro Gurban, Gurban |
| Dambam | Dambam | North Primary School, Zubairu; Kofar Tugagari, Tugagari - I; Kofar Tugagari, Tugagari-II; Kofar Magaji, Magaji; Kofar Masille, Masille Nayinawa; Kofar Fada, Abba Kofar Fada; Kofar Liman, Makama; Tsohon Tasha, Jauro Sabo; Town Dispensary, Sabon Layi; Central Primary School, Nassarawa I; Central Primary School, Nassarawa II; Kofar Madaki, Madaki; Kofar Gulmari, Gulmari; Jale Primary School, Jale; Kofar Jauro, Bauna/Yakasai; Kofar Jauro D/Bamgirgam |
| Dambam | Yanda | Yanda Primary School, Yanda; Kofar Jauro, Garai; Dibo Primary School, Dibo; Kofar Jauro, Bakum; G/Kasuwa Primary School, Bakin Kasuwa; Kofar Jauro, Ganjuwa; Damiyo Primary School, Damiyo; Kofar Jauro, Tulu - Tulu; Kofar Jauro, Yelwa Futali; Kofar Jauro, Garin Doka I; Kofar Jauro, Garin Doka II; Kofar Jauro, Fagarau; Malatu Primary School, Malatu; Bagau Primary School, Bagau; Galimbo Primary School, Galimbo |
| Dambam | Yame | Yame Primary School, Yame; Kofar Jauro, Zobali; Yayari Primary School, Yayari- I; Yayari Primary School, Yayari - II; Koraf Masille, Masille Nayinawa; Kofar Jauro, Dirin Hausa; Gwaramawa Primary School, Gwaramawa; Kofar Jauro, Zongomari; Birniwa Primary School, Birniwa; Kwadatala Primary School, Kwadatala; Fagam Primary School, Fagam I; Fagam Primary School, Fagam II; Kofar Jauro, Barkeji; Kofar Jauro, Dirin Fulani |
| Dambam | Dagauda | District Head Office, Kofar Fada I; District Head Office, Kofar Fada II; Central Primary School, Garin Sanda; Kofar Mai Unguwa, Garin Sanda; Kofar Mai Unguwa, Sabon Layi; Lumbo Primary School, Lumbo; Yayari Primary School, Yayari; Kofar Jauro Kof - Kof, Dariba; Kofar Jauro, Futachi; Ki - Ki Primary School, Lailai; Kofar Jauro, Dinchi; Kofar Jauro, Jauro Sawa |
| Dambam | Gargawa | Kofar Jauro, Feshingo I; Kofar Jauro, Feshingo II; Gargawa Primary School, Gargawa I; Gargawa Primary School, Gargawa II; Nahuta Primary School, Nahuta; Luchambi Primary School, Luchambi; Kofar Jauro, Garin Wayi; Kofar Jauro, Mae'Ra |
| Dambam | Zaura | Ngama Primary School, Ngama; Kofar Sarki, Zaura; Kofar Sarki, Binjinai; Kofar Sarki, Taiyi; Kofar Sarki, Abare; Kofar Sarki, Tayum; Kofar Sarki, Tungwame W.; Biniyu Primary School, Biniyu I; Biniyu Primary School, Biniyu II; Kofar Jauro, Gallam |
| Dambam | Jalam Central | Kofar Sarki, Kofar Sarkin Fada; Kofar Fada, Centyral Primary School; Centyral Primary School, Kofar Kudu; Tudun Wada Primary School, Tudun Wada; Central Primary School, Jangar; Kofar Jauro, Baru; Michika Primary School, Michika I; Michika Primary School, Michika II |
| Dambam | Jalam East | Dorowa Primary School, Dorowa; Kofar Jauro, Kintuwa; Dispensary, Garin Jamai; Kofar Jauro, Garin Jamai; Kofar Sarki, Wayum; Kofar Jauro, Mamudo; Kofar Jauro, Karya Shinge; Janda Primary School, Janda I; Janda Primary School, Janda II; Magambo Primary School, Magambo |
| Darazo | Darazo | Unguwar Baraya I, Central Primary School; Unguwar Baraya II, Central Primary School; Unguwar Baraya III Primary School; Unguwar Baraya, District Office I; Unguwar Baraya, District Office II; Ajiyari Primary School, Ajiyari Primary School I; Ajiyari Primary School, Ajiyari Primary School II; Dabala, Kofar Sarkin Dabala; Kawada, Kofar Galadima; Kawada Annex, Annex Primary School; Batsala, Kofar M/Unguwa Sabo; Tsangaya, Kofar Datti U. Kurmi; Ubulamari, Kofar S. Bulamari; Lafiyaru, Kofar S. Lafiyaru; Gongole, Kofar S. Gongole; Wuro Bogga, Kofar Sarkin Wuro Bogga; Fate, Kofar M/Unguwa; Lifidi, Annex Primary School I; Lifidi, Annex Primary School II; Lifidi I, Kofar Lifidi Darazo; Runfu I, Kofar Liman; Larabawa, Kofar Sarkin Larabawa; Runfu II, Kofar Sule; Tsangaya, Kofar M. Gambo; Ranfa, Ftc Darazo; Garin Jauro Bappah, Kofar Jauro Bappah; Health Office(Unguwar Karfe Community Bank); Unguwar Karfe, Kofar Musa Nasara; Sabon Layi, Area Court Darazo; Unguwar Jarmai I, Social Welfare Office; Unguwar Jarmai, Kofar Ahmadu; Tsangaya Pri. Sch. Vp(Tsangaya); Rigar Gwano, Kofar Sarkin Gwano; Bingi L. Ibc, Kofar Sarkin Bingi; Kanya, Kofar Sarkin Kanya; Gudugul Kanya, Kofar Sarki Kanya (Jauro); Unguwar Zango, Kofar Makama |
| Darazo | Tauya | Fada, Kofar Sarkin Tauya I; Fada, Kofar Sarkin Tauya II; Fada, Tsamiya Primary School; Duwo, Kofar Sarki; Ganjigina, Kofar Jauro; Hardo, Tanya Dispensary; Mamudu, Kofar Jauro; Fadan Zoro, Primary School; Shadarki, Kofar Jauro; Unguwar Waziri, Dispensary I; Unguwar Waziri Dispensary II; Unguwar Waziri Dispensary III; Unguwar Waziri Primary School; Kofar Sarkin Gogo, Kofar Sarki; Kuka Biya, Kofar Jauro; Unguwar Galadima, Primary School Yalwa; Madaki Yalwa, Kofar Fada; Dayi, Kofar Jauro; Malala Tauya, Kofar M/Unguwa; Rama, Kofar M/Unguwa; Rafin Gola, Kofar M/Unguwa; Dogon Ruwa, Kofar Jauro; Galadima, Kofar Galadima I; Galadima, Kofar Galadima II; Lefere, Kofar Jauro; Dakkiti, Kofar Jauro; Kafun Tsangaya K/Alram-Vp(Kafun); Katsinawa Yalwa, Kofar Tauya Katsinawa |
| Darazo | Gabarin | Unguwar Sarki, Kofar Fada Galadima; Makama, Gabarin Primary School; Chiroma, Gabarin Primary School; Unguwar Barde, Kofar Barde; Unguwar Galadima, Kofar Galadima; Zaga, Kofar Jauro Zaga; Gangalawai, Kofar Sarki; Nbula, Kofar Jauro; Daburai, Kofar Jauro; Jimin, Kofar Sarki; Indabo, Kofar Sarki; Giwa, Kofar Sarki; Pandum, Primary School Pandum; Gangalawai, Kofar Mamuje; Gangalawai A Dispensary; Kwarati, Kofar Jauro; Unguwar Bale, Kofar Bappayo; Makama, Tumbingiwa; Sawi, Kofar Sarkin Sawi |
| Darazo | Konkiyal | Unguwar Waziri, Village Head Office I; Unguwar Waziri, Village Head Office II; Unguwar Ajiya, Nursery; Unguwar Wakili, Primary School; Unguwar Yarima A Kofar M/Unguwa; Unguwar Yarima, Dispensary; Unguwar Wakili C K/Wakili; Unguwar Sarkin Baka, K/Baka; Gakkulan Fada, Kofar Sarki; Kwattje, Kofar Sarki; Tsamiya, Kofar Sarki; Yabusala, Kofar Sarki; Sabu Gari, Kofar Jauro; Sabu Makera, Kofar Sarki; Chikauje, Kofar Jauro; Gakkulan Audi, Kofar Jauro |
| Darazo | Lago | Lafiya Lago, Kofar Sarki; Yolawa Lago, Kofar Sarki- I; Yolawa Lago, Kofar Sarki - II; Gakkulan Ganuwa, Kofar Jauro; Madaki, Kofar Madaki -I; Madaki, Kofar Madaki -II; Katsinnawa, Kofar Sarki; Katsinnawa, Kofar Jauro; Kari Tasha, Primary School; Kayau, Kofar Jauro; Bam, Kofar Jauro; Kari Ganuwa, Kofar Jauro; Garka, Kofar Jauro; Tande, Kofar Jauro; Digiri, Primary School; Waziri Abba Fada -Vp(Gakkulan); Unguwar Madaki, Lago Dispensary; Jaja, Kofar Jauro; Karitasha, Kofar M/Unguwa |
| Darazo | Sade | Kofar Fada, District H/ Office; Unguwar Galadima, Kofar Galadima; Unguwar Liman, Kofar Liman; Unguwar Hardo, Kofar Hardo; Kofar Maiungu. Ashiru(Tasha Sade Dis.); Tasha, Sade Dispensary II; Taguje, Primary School; Damata, Kofar Sarki; Nahuta, Kofar Sarki; Lemari, Kofar Sarki; Chabaya, Kofar Sarki; Garin M. Fari, Kofar Sarki; Zandam, Primary School; Daba Babba, Kofar Sarki; Garin Cindo, Kofar Sarki; Garin Manuji, Kofar Sarki; Dalagobe, Kofar Sarki; Yunbunga, Primary School; Kari Ngocca, Kofar Jauro; Zankwada, Kofar Jauro; Kinci, Kofar Sarki; Garin Daji, Kofar Sarki; Unguwar A. Shugaba, Sade Primary School I; Unguwar A. Shugaba, Sade Primary School II; Dalagobe (Ngakarkashi), Kofar Jauro |
| Darazo | Lanzai | Unguwar Fada, Village Head Office I; Unguwar Fada, Village Head Office II; Unguwar Galadima, Dispensary I; Unguwar Galadima, Dispensary II; Dulali, Kofar Jauro; Lanzai, Maternity; Kaugama, Kofar Jauro I; Kaugama, Kofar Jauro II; Bulawa, Kofar Jauro; S. Garin Lanzai, Kofar Jauro; Doshon Kaba, Kofar Jauro; Fulanin Kaba, Kofar Jauro; Tudun Wada Wargi, Primary School; Banayaba(Korawa); Yelwa, Kofar M/Unguwa; Nahuta Maisaje, Kofar M/Unguwa; Lanzai Tasha Pri. Sch.(Lanzai Tasha Motor Park) |
| Darazo | Yautare | Malurin Tudu Kofar Jauro(Malurin Kwari Kofar Jauro); Fadan Yautare, Kofar Sarki; Danbaji, Primary School; Taguji, Kofar Sarki; Kobazo, Kofar Sarki; S. Garin Bagurum, Kofar Sarki; Jonorde, Kofar Sarki; Shuwari, Kofar Sarki; Bagurum, Bagurum Primary School; Langawa, Kofar Jauro; Sabon Sara, Kofar Jauro; Maluri, Kwari Kofar Jauro |
| Darazo | Gabciyari | Galadima, Primary School; Galadima, Kofar Galadima; Turaki, Kofar Turaki; Yerima, Kofar Yerima; Wakili, Kofar Wakili - I; Wakili, Kofar Wakili - II; Kawuri, Kofar Jauro; Kaigamari, Primary School; Bille, Kofar Sarki; Tsangayari, Kofar Sarki; Gandun, Kofar Sarki; Madakiri, Kofar S. Garin; Gandum, Kofar S. Garin; Jambalde, Kofar Jauro; Taura, Kofar Jauro; Kaigamari, Kofar Jauro; Koli, Kofar Jauro; Korkor, Kofar Jauro; Buburi, Kofar Jauro |
| Darazo | Wahu | Kofar Fada, Kofar Fada I; Kofar Fada, Kofar Fada II; Unguwar Waziri, Wahu Primary School; Bajarin Pri-Vp(Jiro Primary School); Fulataran, Kofar Sarki; Magume, Kofar Sarki; Lagon Wahu, Lago Primary School; Gatsanga, Kofar Sarki; Lafiya, Kofar Sarki; Baguba, Kofar Sarki; Rigar Rafi Pri(Ung. Madaki Kofar Madaki); Sauke Kofar Sarki-Vp(Garin Leas); Garin Didi, Kofar Sarki |
| Darazo | Papa | Korawa, Kofar Sarki; Farin Bango, Kofar Sarki; Unguwar Waziri, Kofar Sarki; Bagaji, Kofar Sarki; A. Babba, Kofar Sarki; Kafiyel, Kofar Sarki; Unguwar Waziri, Dispensary; Jauro Manu, Kofar J. Manu; Garin Abare, Kofar Sarki; Badiga K/Jauro-Vp(Nayinawa K/Sanki); Babaye, Kofar Sarki; Zobo, Kofar Sarki; Dugo, Kofar Sarki; Maina Jeje K/Jauro-Vp (Mai Lafia); Malam Hussaini, Kofar M. Hussaini; Fulanin Kaba, Kofar Jauro; Wurodole, Kofar Jauro; Garin M. Ibrahim, Kofar Jauro; Unguwar Fada, Papa Primary School; Unguwargaladima, Kofar Galadima; Mubi Pri. Sch-Vp (Ung. Sarki Safe); Tsangaya, Kofar Sarki; Jauro Yuguda, Kofar Sarki; Garin Alhaji, Kofar Sarki; Ganubu, Kofar Sarki; Aliya Gajere, Kofar Sarki; Unguwar Fada Papa, Kofar Sarki -I; Unguwar Fada Papa, Kofar Sarki- II |
| Dass | Bagel/Bajar | Bagel Central, Bagel Primary School; Bajar Central, Bajar Primary School; Lirr, Kofar Sarkin Lirr; Galagam, Galagam Primary School; Bawusun, Kofar Sarkin Bawusun |
| Dass | Bundot | Bundot Centre, Kofar Sarkin Bundot; Bundot Centre, Kofar Sarkin Bunduli Dutsi; Bundot Centre, Bundot Primary School; Dabardak, Dabardak Primary School; Kanwara/Mbak, Government Social Welfare Office; Bundulin Kasa, Bundulin Kasa Primary School |
| Dass | Bununu Central | Sarkin Arewa W/ Mazadu Primary School; Sarkin Arewa, State Community Development Office; Dawaki/Gyamas, Kofar Mai Keke; Dawaki/Gyamas, Town Maternity; Makama, Town Dispensary; Makama, Old Police Station; Sarkin Bam, Kofar Maji Dadi; Abuja, Kofar Katuka; Barde, Kofar Sarkin Dass; Pegin Doka, Pegin Doka Primary School; Madaki, Kofar Madaki; Burgel/ Shall - Gwntar, S. Gwantar Primary School; Banko/Takwat - Shinge, F. Banko Primary School; Tak - Bunduli, Kofar Sarkin Buntal; Garam/Dorza, Garam Primary School; Tudun - Wuss, Kofar Sarkin Tudun Wuss |
| Dass | Bununu South | Gital/Kardam, Near Galadiman Gital; Badel/Nasarawa, Badel Primary School I; Badel/Nasarawa, Badel Primary School II; Bagas/Bunjang, Behind Saleh Bagas House; Gajiwal, Gajiwal Primary School; Gandu/Bashi, Bashi Primary School; Yalwa/Gadiya, Yalwa Primary School; Nahuta/Dinsim, Nahuta Primary School; Butur, Butur Dispensary; Pitman, Kofar Hardon Pitman; Bangim, Bangim Primary School; Tallaran, Tallaran Primary School |
| Dass | Baraza | Gumti, Gumti Primary School; Madaki/Wakili, Lumana Primary School; Buzuri, Kofar Sarkin Buzuri; Gibkir/Magaji, Tashan Gibkir; Gala, Gala Primary School; Bandas, Bandas Primary School; Bagan, Bagan Primary School; Unguwar Magaji, Baraza Maternity |
| Dass | Dott | Dott Centre, Zagi Primary School; Galadima/S. Ciroma, Dott Dispensary; Kuletu, Kuletu Primary School; Kagadama, Kagadama Primary School; Gobirawa/Sabon Gari, Sabon Gari; Ciroma – Babar Gidan Ciroma |
| Dass | Durr | Durr Centre, Durr Primary School; Durr Centre, Durr Dispensary; Madaki/Zandi, Kofar Madaki; Largwan/Kufai, Kofar Sarkin Tsafi Durr; Babang, Near Dado Market; Kwangal, Kofar S. Kwangal |
| Dass | Polchi | Bazali Centre, Bazali Primary School I; Bazali Centre, Bazali Primary School II; Dumba, Dumba Primary School; Dutsen Kura, Dutsen Kura Primary School; Zinmbal, Bazali Viewing Centre I; Jalbang Centre, Jalbang Dispensary |
| Dass | Wandi | Garin Wandi, Gurama Primary School; Garin Wandi, Wandi Viewing Centre; Garin Wandi, Ciroman Wandi; Gwaltukurwa/Lusa, Gwaltukurwa Primary School; Dangri, Dangri Primary School; Dogon - Maje/Kwafa, Dogon Maje |
| Dass | Zumbul/Lukshi | Zandi/Yalwa/Dance, Near Allabura House; Lukshi Centre, Lukshi Primary School; Lukshi Centre, Lukshi Dispensary; Lagiji, Kofar Ciroman Lagaji; Zumbul Centre, Zumbul Primary School; Kwallak, Kofar Sarkin Kwallak; Gwarlak/Yalwa, Kofar Sarkin Yalwa; Unguwar Madaki, Bore - Hole Near Madaki |
| Gamawa | Gamawa | Unguwar Baba A Econ Plan Office; Unguwar Baba B Licence Office; Unguwar S/Noma A Women Centra; Unguwar S/Noma B Islamic School; Unguwar Abdu Bature Central Primary School I; Unguwar Abdu Bature Central Primary School II; Unguwar S/Noma Abdu Bature C Dispensary Clinic; Unguwar S. Hamidu, Islamic School; Unguwar S. Kafi A Veterninary Clinic; Unguwar Umba, L. G. Garege I; Unguwar Umba, L. G. Garege II; Unguwar Saje Adamu, L. G. Garege; Unguwar Sarkin Gabu, Ibrahim Primary School; Unguwar S. Hausawa, Central Primary School I; Unguwar S. Hausawa, Central Primary School II; Unguwar Unguwar Bappa Malam, Day Primary School; Unguwar Unguwar Audu Dogo, Day Primary School; Amarchiyari Amarchi, Village Open Space; Bale, Bale Village; Gayau, G. Sango Village I; Gayau, G. Sango Village II; Gayau, Gayau Village III; Kokori, Kokori Village; Jungudori, Jungudori Village; Sabayo, Sabayo Village; Wuro Bulli, Wuro Bulli Village; Kunchi Kuni, Kunchi Kuni Village; Maluri, Maluri Village; Ningiri Kama, Ningiri Kama Village; Rabori, Rabori Village |
| Gamawa | Kafin Romi | Kafi Romi, Primary School I; Kafi Romi, Primary School II; Mareri, Mareri Village Primary School; Buniyami Primary School; Umeri, Umeri Village; Kwadam, Kwadam Village; Mainari, Mainari Village; Bukarami, Bukarami Village; Suppah H Primary School I; Suppah H Primary School II; Amarchiyari, Amarchiyari Village I; Amarchiyari, Amarchiyari Village II |
| Gamawa | Gololo | Unguwar Waziri, Guest House; Unguwar Waziri, Primary School; Unguwar Madaki, Primary School; Unguwar Dabi, Dabi Village; Unguwar Shatoka, Shatoka Village; Unguwar Garin Dole, Garin Dole Village; Unguwar Adamu Sabo, Primary School; Unguwar M. Mato, Primary School I; Unguwar Mammadu, Primary School II; Unguwar M. Idi Primary School I; Unguwar M. Idi Primary School II; Unguwar M. Idi Primary School III; Kincha, Dispensary I; Jullah, Jullah Village; Garin Lamido, G. L. Village; Garin J. Sale, K/Jouro; Garin J. Sale, K/Jauro; Galkore, Jeberi Village; Sansan, Sansan Village; Garin Jauro Boderi; Shabaji, Shabaji Village |
| Gamawa | Kubdiya | Kubdiya Kofar Fada, Village Head Office I; Kubdiya Kofar Fada, Village Head Office II; Kubdiya Kofar Fada, Dispensary III; Kore Gabas, Primary School; Kore Yamma, Primary School I; Kore Yamma, Primary School II; Inkiwari, Primary School; Galjiri, Galjiei Village; Karkanemi, Karkanemi Village I; Karkanemi, Karkanemi Village II; Kulusku, Kulusku Village; Adabda, Adabda Primary School I; Adabda, Adabda Primary School II; Adabda, Adabda Primary School III; Kutunas Primary School; Gangawa Primary School I; Gangawa Primary School II; Lafiyari, Lafiyari Village; Abutta, Abutta Village; Kukayasku, Kukayasku Village; Kari Kachaf, Kari Kachaf Village; Yarin Wari, Yarin Wari Village |
| Gamawa | Alagarno/Jadori | Alagarno Primary School I; Alagarno Primary School II; Alagarno Primary School III; Gadidawa, Gadidawa Village; Gadidawa Rafi, Rafi Village; Manawari, Manawari Village; Sabon Gari, S. G. Primary School I; Sabon Gari, Primary School II; Bordedol, Bordedol Village; Kekeno A Primary School; Jullani, Jullani Village; Hardori, Hardori Village; Kogga, Kogga Village; Jodori, Primary School I; Jodori, Primary School II; Raba Raba, Primary School; Jeshi, Jeshi Village; Bundujaru, Primary School I; Bundujaru, Primary School II; Burnuku, Burnuku Village; Kaisawa Yamma, Primary School; Kaisawa Dole, Primary School; Biriri, Biriri Village; Gattattara Primary School I; Gattattara Primary School II; Jagana, Jagana Village |
| Gamawa | Tumbi | Bulanna Primary School I; Bulanna Primary School II; Garin Jauro Idau, G. Village; Doleri, Doleri Village; Wabu, Wabu Village; Dogon Marke, Dogon Marke Village; Yabal, Primary School I; Yabal, Primary School II; Kirikasosuwa, Primary School; Kirikasosuwa, Primary School II; Tumbi, Primary Sachool I; Tumbi, Primary Sachool II; Tumbi, Primary Sachool III; Bona Mari, Bona Mari Village; Bona Mari, Garin Jumba Village; Bacchal, Bacchal Village; Kadikadi A Primary School; Gibiya, Gibiya Village |
| Gamawa | Udubo | Udubo, Primary School I; Udubo, Primary School II; Udubo West Pri. Sch.(Udubo Tsangaya I); Udubo West Pri. Sch.(Udubo Tsangaya II); Udubo Yamma, Primary School I; Udubo Yamma, Primary School II; Udubo Yamma, Primary School III; Udubo Yamma, Primary School IV; Kasuwa Village Pri. Sch (Kasuwa I); Kasuwa Village Pri. Sch (Kasuwa II); Hardori, Hardori Village; Gwarbatu A Pruimary School; Damba, Damba Village; Kore Pri Sch ( Kore One A); Kore Pri Sch ( Kore One B); Kwatabur, Kwatabur Village; Kankare Village Pry Sch (Mandi-Kankare); Yarimari, Yarimari; Dafara, Dafara; Tonde, Tonde; Zawa, Primary School; Tufferi, Primary School; Garuwa, Primary School; Jimina, Primary School; Kuda, Kuda; Kesa Pry. Sch. (Kesa 1); Kesa Pry. Sch. (Kesa II); Bulaudo, Bulaudo Primary School; Kesan Auyakawa, Kesan; Sara, Sara Primary School; Yaba Village Pry Sch; Yaba Village Pry Sch II; Garin Alhaji, Primary School; Gubori, Veterinary; Garin Boda Pry Sch.(Garin Boda); Mashuwa, Kukadu; Kukadi Pry Sch. (Kukadi); Wabo Village Pry. Sch. (Wabo A)'; Wabo Village Pry. Sch. (Wabo B)'; Garin Malam Pry Sch (Garin Malam); Garin Malam Pry Sch (Garin Malam II); Karikafchi/Karika, Village Open Place; Garin Malm. Jumba; Marana, Primary School I; Marana, Primary School II; Dauduri Village; Garin M. Yusuf Garin M. Yusuf Village; Garin Makau G. Mk. Village; Garin Bara G. Bara Village; Majumba, Majumba Village; Dawaru, Duwaru Village; Gafure, Gafure Village; Shanga, Shanga Village |
| Gamawa | Tarmasuwa | Tarmasuwa, Primary School I; Tarmasuwa, Primary School II; Biri Biri, Biri Biri Village I; Biri Biri, Biri Biri Village II; Alhajiri, Alhajiri Village; Dallari Pri. Sch. (Dallari); Dalmari Pry. Sch.(Dalmari); Garin Dala Dala; Dorawaji, Dorawaji; Bauchiri Pry Sch. (Bauchiri I); Bauchiri Pry Sch. (Bauchiri II); Garin Badawai, Badawai Village; Garin Janbari, Primary School |
| Gamawa | Raga | Raga Primary School I; Raga Primary School II; Raga, Primary School III; Raga, Primary School IV; Bakata, Bakata Village; Magajiri, Magajiri Village; Isari, Isari Village; Danchuwa, Primary School; Samo Primary School; Aido Primary School; Aido G/Alhaji Hardo; Lade, Lade Village; Lugagu, Luga Village; Gayawa Primary School; Bagel, Bagel Village; Zikidiri, Zikidiri Village; Bakori Bakori Village; Bakori 'B' Bakori Primary School; Danbayel, Danbayel Village; Bilabirin, Bilabirin Village; Dagaleri, Dambari Village I; Dumbari, Dumbari Village II; Buskuwa, Buskuwa Village; Fewa Dam, Fewa Dam Village; Turakiri, Turakiri Village; Mabanni, Mabanni Village; Taranka, Taranka Village; Gangawa, Gangawa Village; Agwado, Agwado Village; Danguri, Danguri Village; Shalum, Shalum Village |
| Gamawa | Gadiya | Markaderi, Markaderi Village; Gasgaya, Gasgaya Village; Bauna, Bauna Village; D/Barwatari, D/Barwatari Village; Kachakawari, Kachakawari Village; Kyaulori Village Pri. Sch.; Alamaiko, Alamaiko; Gadiya Pri Sch; Kumbari, Kumbari Village; Sharifiri, Sharifiri; Gadiya Primary School I; Gadiya Primary School II; Kaleri Primary School; Ganalboji, Ganalboji Primary School; Bambururi, Bambururi Primary School; Faterri, Faterri Primary School; Ganalboji, Pry. Sch. |
| Gamawa | Zindi | Zindi, Zindi Primnary School I; Zindi, Zindi Primnary School II; Unguwar Mal. Ali Primary School; Unguwar Dan Kalomari Primary School; Unguwar Alhaji Garba, Maternity; Village Head Office/ Primary Sch.; Sadawai Pri. Sch.(Sadawai); Garin Kure, Pry. Sch (Garin Kure); Kachalari, Kachalari Village; Kuranjeje, Kuranjeje Village; Garin Jauro Shehu, Shehu Village; Garin Makama, Makama Village |
| Ganjuwa | Ganjuwa | Ganjuwa, Ganjuwa Primary School I; Ganjuwa, Ganjuwa Primary School II; Marbini, Marbini Primary School; Zala, Zala Primary School; Zamo, Kofar Sarki; Gyaduwa, Kofar Sarkin Gyaduwa; Zaka Kariya, Kofar Sarki Zaka Karno; Yanda, Kofar Sarki Yanda; K/Galadima, D/Galadima Sarki; Baya, Kofar Sarkin Baya; Soro K/Klum, Soro Primary I; Soro K/Klum, Soro Primary II; Digawa, Kofar Sarkin Digawa; Unguwar Wakili Kofar Mai Unguwa Wakili; Unguwar Sarki Kofar Unguwar Sarki; Dare, Kofar Maiunguwa Dare; Marga Kofar Maianguwa Marga; Kafin Magaji Kofar Maianguwa K/Magaji; Dawi, Kofar Maianguwa Dawi; N. Madadiya, Kofar Maianguwa Madadiya; Giri Ginaka, Kofar Sarki; Dari, Kofar Sarki; Kungiri, Kofar Sarki; Tudun Wada, Kofar Sarkin Tudun Wada; Kafin Radi, Kofar Sarki; Unguwar Umar Kofar Mai Unguwar Umar |
| Ganjuwa | Gungura | Gungura, Gungura Primary School I; Gungura, Gungura Primary School II; Kediya, Kofar Sarki Kediya; Gabi, Kofar Sarkin Gabi I; Jurara Abbas, Kofar S/Jurara A.; Jurara Gulte, Kofar S/Jurara G.; Bakunawa, Kofar Sarkin Bakunawa; Wuro Bogga, Kofar Sarkin W. Bogga; Jalingo, Kofar Sarkin Jalingo; Gamadadi, Kofar Sarki Gamadadi; Gabi II, Kofar S/Gabi II; Buri - Buri, Kofar Sarkin Buri - Buri; Bada Koshi, Kofar Sarkin Badakoshi; Gwadal, Kofgar Sarkin Gwadal; Sakarumbu, Kofar Sarkin Sakarumbu I; Sakarumbu, Kofar Sarkin Sakarumbu II; Dauduwo I, Primary School; Unguwar Wa Kili, Kofar Sarki; Wuro Nagge, Kofar Sarkin; Dauduwo II, Primary School |
| Ganjuwa | Kafin Madaki | Kofar Buri I, Vocational Training Centre; Kofar Buri II, Women Centre; Kofar Badu, K/Madaki Primary School; Unguwar Jakada, Old Secretariat; Unguwar Kwari, Primary School; Marmasa, Kofar Sarkin Marmada; Kula, Kofar Sarkin Kula; Kafin Kawu, II Kafin Kawu; Lamba I, Kofar Sarkin Lamba; Kafin Liman, Primary School; Tafa Zuwa, Kofar Sarkin Tafazuwa; Futuru, Kofar Sarkin Futuru; Ringim, Ringim Primary School; Bakinka Naka, Kofar S/B/Naka; Kadale, Kofar Sarkin Kadale |
| Ganjuwa | Kariya | Zida, Zida Primary School; Digawa, Kofar S/Dagawa; Yalwan Gada, Kofar Sarki; Bridge Two, Kofar Sarki; Bridge Two, Kofar Mai Unguwa; Kurada, Primary School; Kalasu, Primary School; Jangu, Kofar Sarki; Wushi Kofar Sarkin Wushi; Haka Tafi, Kofar Sarki; Bawa, Kofar Sarkin Bawa; Yalwan Kurasa, Kofar S/Kurasa; Tibbaku, Kofar Sarki; Kariya, Kariya Primary School; Tulu, Tulu Primary School I; Tulu Primary School, Tulu II; G/Kawari, Kofar Sarki; Zigam, Kofar Sarkin Zigam; Garin Wada, Kofar Sarki; Mai Alewa, Kofar Sarkin Mai Alewa; Dubu, Kofar Sarkin Dubu; Dutsen Giwa, Kofar Sarki; Bubga, Kofar Sarki; Shagari, Kofar Sarkin Shagari; Maizuma, Kofar Sarkin Maizuma; Taka - Tabo, Kofar Sarkin Taka-Tabo; Sabon Kariya, Sabon Kariya Primary School I; Sabon Kariya, Sabon Kariya Primary School II |
| Ganjuwa | Kubi East | Zalanga Zalanga Primary School I; Zalanga Zalanga Primary School II; Kakkuma, Kakkuma Primary School; D/Denawa, D/Denawa Primary School; Panga, Kofar Sarki; Zuwan Fulani Primary School; Dirya, Yaga Primary School; Yaga Yaga Primary School; Wailo, Wailo Primary School; Zamo, Zamo Primary School; Marga, Marga Primary School; Kare - Kare, Kofar Sarki; Gama Dadi, Gamadi Kofar Sarki; Musawa Kofar Sarkin Musawa; Tsiri, Kofar Sarkin Tsiri |
| Ganjuwa | Kubi West | Kubi, Kubi Primary School I; Kubi, Kubi Primary School II; Jubo, Kofar Sarki; Damanguza, Kofar Sarki; Zuwan Denawa, Kofar Sarki; Kuna, Kofar Sarki; Kufo, Kofar Sarki Kufo; Shila, Kofar Sarkin Shila; Shila Jumbi, Kofar Sarki; Botto, Kofar Sarki; Katele, Kofar Sarki; Yurlu, Kofar Sarki; Duma, Kofar Sarki; Yala, Kofar Sarkin Yala |
| Ganjuwa | Miya East | Jimbi, Jimbi Primary School; Galdan Jimbi, Kofar Sarki; Zara, Primary School, Zara I; Zara, Primary School, Zara II; Delan Ganji, Kofar Sarki; Jimbin Zangi, Kofar Sarki; Zara Fada, Kofar Sarki I; Zara Fada, Kofar Sarki II; Jimbin Zangil, Kofar Sarki; Unguwar Masu Zara, Kofar Sarki; Gorondo, Kofar Sarki; Kariya Wudufa, Kofar Sarki; Burku I, Primary School; Tsagu, Primary School Tsaguy; Kariya K/Kagadama, Kofar Sarki; Laguru, Kofar Sarki; Kawari, Kofar Sarki; Burku II, Kofar Sarki |
| Ganjuwa | Miya West | Unguwar S. Hausawa I, Kofar Sarki; Unguwar S. Hausawa II, Kofar Sarki; Unguwar Galadima, Kofar Mai Unguwa; Unguwar Sarkin Gabas I, Kofar Maianguwa; Unguwar Sarkin Gabas II, Kofar Sarki; Unguwar Ari, Primary School; Unguwar Buba, Kofar Mai Anguwa; Unguwan S. Kudu, Kofar Sarki; Unguwan Chiroma, Kofar Sarki; Unguwar Tarabu, Kofar Sarki; Unguwar Wakili, Kofar Sarki; Unguwar Majidadi, Kofar Anguwa; Unguwar Madaki, Kofar Madaki; Unguwar Sarkin Fada, Dofar Sarkin Fada; Sarki Arewa, Primary School; Ang. Karchawa, Kofar Sarki; Siri Baba I, Primary School; Siri Baba II, Primary School; Gala, Kofar Sarki; Jili, Kofar Sarki; Siri Zurhu, Primary School; Yalwan Gameru, Kofar Sarki; Siri Galda, Kofar Sarki; Siri Babba, Primary School; Unguwar Ari II, Basdp, Miya |
| Ganjuwa | Nasarawa North | Unguwar Madaki, Kofar Madaki; Unguwar Umaru I, Primary School; Unguwar Umaru II, Primary School; Siyi I, Primary School; Siyi II, Primary School; Fanisau, Kofar Sarki; Gurzum, Kofar Sarki; Loyi I, Primary School Loyi; Loyi II, Primary School Loyi; Zugerawa, Kofar Sarki; Buzum, Kofar Sarki; Rudu - Bida, Kofar Sarki; Mendu, Kofar Sarki; Gaukaka, Kofar Sarki; Lafiyari, Kofar Sarki; Jimi, Kofar Sari Jimi |
| Ganjuwa | Nasarawa South | Degele, Kofar Sarki Degele; Gilliri I, Primary School; Gilliri II, Primary School; Deben Kasuwa I Primary School; Deben Kasa, Kofar Sarki; Samni, Kofar Sarki; Gerwuli, Kofar Sarki; Dorgomi, Kofar Sarki; Shira, Kofar Sarki; Gere, Kofar Sarki - I; Gere, Kofar Sarki -II; Sabon Jalingo, Kofar Sarki; Nahuta Kofar, Sarkin Nahuta; Daren Kasuwa II, Kofar Sarki; Dasha, Kofar Sarki |
| Ganjuwa | Yali | Yali, Primary School Yali; Rudu Yausa Primary School; Danbaluwa, Kofar Sarki; Dumun, Dumun Primary School; Kwarba, Kofar Sarki; Gindi, Kofar Sarki; Gangu, Kofar Sarki; Zongoro Primary School; Gawa, Kofar Sarki; Firo, Primary School; Takale, Kofan Sarki; Badaromo, Kofar Sarki; Yuli, Kofar Sarki; Duma, Kofar Sarki; Dulu, Kofar Sarki Dulu |
| Giade | Chinkani | Chinkani Kofar Jauro I; Chinkani Kofar Jauro II; Korawa Abba, Kofar Jauro; Wuro Nange, Wuro Nange Primary School; Lafiyaru, Kofar Jauro; Garu, Kofar Jauro; Jabbewo, Kofar Jauro; Sagi, Kofar Jauro; Yalwa Kurba, Kofar Jauro; Lafiya, Kofar Jauro; Alako, Kofar Jauro; Kurba, Kofar Sarkin Kurba I; Kurba, Kofar Sarkin Kurba II; Kurba, Kurba Primary School; Kayakaya, Kofar Jauro; Jarmawo, Kofar Jauro; Lagada Kofar Jauro; Lagada, Kofar Jauro; Sabon Gari, Kofar Jauro; Chinkani Tsohuwa, Kofar Jauro; Balaki, Kofar Jauro |
| Giade | Sabon Sara | Sabon Sara, Primary School; Korawa Yamma, Kofar Jauro; Bambiyon Barebari, Kofar Jauro; Bambiyon Fulani, Primary School; Yola, Kofar Jauro; Kiliye, Kofar Jauro; Amadiri, Kofar Jauro; Kwayati, Kofar Jauro; Jada, Kofar Jauro; Abunare, Primary School; Mainari, Kofar Jauro; Minchika, Kofar Jauro; Mainamalari, Kofar Jauro; Sabon Sara, Kofar Jauro |
| Giade | Doguwa Central | Doguwa, Kofar Sarki- I; Doguwa, Kofar Sarki -II; Doguwa, Primary School; Doguwa, Kofar Malam Mato; Baduware, Kofar Jauro; Tagwaye, Kofar Jauro; Gulbum, Kofar Sarki; Gulbum, Primary School; Bulama Koko, Kofar Jauro; Tsakuwa, Kofar Jauro |
| Giade | Doguwa South | Garanya, Kofar Jauro; Katamba, Katamba Primary School; Jugudu, Kofar Fada; Jugudu, Primary School; Garande, Kofgar Jauro; Garande Jeji, Kofgar Jauro; Jarigo, Kofgar Jauro |
| Giade | Giade | Giade North, Village Head Office; Giade South, Giade Dispensary; Unguwar Datti, Kofar Mallam Datti - I; Unguwar Datti, Kofar Mallam Datti- II; Giade East, Day Primary School; Giade Central, Central Primary School; Tsangayan Kudu, Kofar Allaramma; Giade Maternity, Town Maternity; Unguwar Zailani, Kofar Zailani; Korawa, Kofar Jauro; Kafin Hardo, Primary School; Zindiri, Primary School; Yandure, Primary School; Shadiri, Kofar Jauro I; Shadiri, Kofar Jauro II; Kofar Sarkin Mudu |
| Giade | Isawa | Isawa, Kofar Fada I; Isawa, Kofar Fada II; Isawa, Primary School; Unguwar Yarima, Kofar Yarima; Isawa, Dispensary; Barore, Kofar Jauro; Juggari, Kofar Jauro; Gabbassamawo, Kofar Jauro; Yarimari, Kofar Jauro; Jawo, Kofar Jauro; Burku, Kofar Jauro; Ganduha, Kofar Jauro I; Ganduha, Kofar Jauro II; Margiri, Primary School |
| Giade | U. Zum A' | Uzum, Sabuwa Primary School; Uzum, Tsohuwa Kofar Jauro I; Uzum, Tsohuwa Kofar Jauro II; Goburawa, Kofar Jauro; Gadaule, Kofar Jauro; Hardori, Kofar Jauro; Rigar Yarima, Kofar Jauro; Zakirmari, Kofar Jauro |
| Giade | Uzum B' | Faguji Yamma, Kofar Jauro; Faguri Centre, Primary School I; Faguji Centre, Primary School II; Faguji Gabas, Primary School; Digashi, Primary School; Boggel Bali, Kofar Jauro; Tsangaya, Kofar Jauro |
| Giade | Zabi | Zabi, Zabi Primary School; Zabi, Kofar Sarki; Auyakari, Gidan Wakili- I; Auyakari, Gidan Wakili - II; Galdimari, Primary School I; Galdimari, Primary School II; Kimari Primary School; Jabelwo, Kofar Jauro; Gubda, Kofar Jauro; Abaduwa, Kofar Jauro |
| Giade | Zirrami | Zirami, Kofar Fada I; Zirami, Kofar Fada II; Zirami, Primary School; Suwari Fulani, Kofar Jauro; Abba Jori, Kofar Jauro; Ganji, Primary School; Dahuwari, Kofar Jauro; Jarmawo, Primary School; Aniyo, Kofar Jauro; Lai Lai, Primary School; Magayra, Primary School; Kwagga, Kofar Jauro; Garande, Kofar Jauro |
| Itas/Gadau | Itas | Unguwar Fawari I, Kofar Sarkin Fawa; Unguwar Fawari II, Fawari Primary School; Unguwar Mati, Magama Itas; Unguwar Kaura, Bsadp; Unguwar Gambo, Central Primary School; Itas Yamma Lowcost, Tafida Primary School; Alagarno, Kofar Fada; Gidan Baduku, Kofar Fada; Faffanga/Jama'Are, Kofar Fada; Garin Baushe, Baushe Primary School; Itas Gana, Primary School Itas Gana; Baushedaji, Kofar Fada; Kafata Gabas, Kofar Fada; Kafata Yamma, Primary School; Jankude, Bakin Rijiya; Lauwo, Bakin Makaranta; Gijina, Primary School; Manawashi, Kofar Fada; Gandiyel, Kofar Fada; Kajwai, Primary School; Asarara, Kofar Fada; Gaduwawa, Kofar Fada; Itas Kofar Fada, District Head Office |
| Itas/Gadau | Mashema | Mashema Gabas, Kofar Fada; Mashema Yamma, Primary School; Mashema Tsangaya, Kofar Alaramma I; Mashema Tsangaya, Kofar Alaramma II; Tsakuma, Kofar Dandau; Mashema Wailawo, Dispensary; Kashuwa, Primary School; Kofar Fada; Gyara Yamma, Primary School; Buru, Kofar Fada; Tsamiya, Bakin Dandali; Mijiya Gabas, Primary School; Mijiya Yamma, Bakin Kasuwa; Zango, Kofar Fada; Kofar Kuza, Kofar Fada; Dawasa, Kofar Fada; Zakwaran, Primary School; Lutai, Kofar Fada; Mijiya Tsangaya, Kofar Mai Unguwa |
| Itas/Gadau | Gwarai | Gwarai/Gara, Primary School; Dawasa, Kofar Fada; Madan, Kofar Fada; Bori, Kofar Fada; Dagashi, Primary School; Fango, Primary School I; Fango, Dispensary II; Kunkel, Kofar Fada; Kila Gana, Primary School; Kwajalewo, Kofar Fada; Taura Amadu, Gidan Amadu I; Taura Adamu, Gidan Adamu II; Kirbitin, Kofar Fada; Beguwa, Kofar Fada |
| Itas/Gadau | Abdallawa/Magarya | Magarya Gabas Kofar Fada; Magarya Gabas Village Head Office; Magarya Yamma, Primary School; Gurawa Kofar Fada; Yelwa Kofar Fada; Makani Kofar Fada; Abdallawa, Bakin Dandali; Bimawa, Rijiyan Hardo; Andalewo Kofar Fada; Alkayawa Kofar Fada; Gambara, Primary School; Kagama Kofar Fada; Jura, Primary School; Yafarfar Kofar Fada |
| Itas/Gadau | Buzawa | Buzawa Gabas Kofar Fada; Buzawa Yamma Kofar Fada; Kachokal Kofar Fada; Galdimawa Kofar Fada; Kafin Jeji, Primary School; Danbatta Kofar Fada; Ramin Kura Kofar Fada; Gidan Ganji, Primary School; Yelwa G/Ganji Kofar Fada; Yelwa G/Ganji Maternity; Gidan Yayari Kofar Fada; Yarayi Kofar Fada; Hatsara Kofar Fada; Katsinawa Kofar Fada; Kakomu Kofar Fada |
| Itas/Gadau | Bilkicheri | Gamsha Gabas, Kofar Sarki; Gamsha Yamma Primary School; Gamsha Yamma Dispensary; Gubedori, Kofar Fada; Sabon Sara, Kofar Fada; Gidan Kwalan, Kofar Fada; Gatari, Kofar Fada; Akayi, Kofar Fada; Garado I, Primary School; Garado II, Kofar Fada; Kura Babba, Kofar Fada; Arama, Kofar Fada; Gululu, Kofar Fada; Dani, Kofar Fada; Dolori, Kofar Fada I; Dolori, Kofar Fada II; Kuran M. Ya'U, Kofar Fada; Hatsin Kawoni, Kofar Fada; Sabon Sara, Primary School |
| Itas/Gadau | Bambal | Bambal Gabas, Primary School; Bambal Yamma, Kofar Fada; Girinbo, Kofar Fada; Duhuwa Gabas, Primary School; Duhuwa Yamma, Kofar Fada; Garin Dole, Primary School; Garin Dole, Kofar Fada; Gidan Duru, Kofar Fada; Gidan Amar, Kofar Fada; Tsaba, Kofar Fada; Kowon Gabas, Kofar Fada; Kowon Yamma, Kofar Fada |
| Itas/Gadau | Gadau | Gadau Tsakiya, District Head Office; Gadau Tsakiya, Kofar Fada; Gadau Yamma, Primary School; Gadau Kudu, Technical College; Malumawa Gadau, Kofar Fada; Gadau Fulani, Mai Unguwa Tsangaya; Gadau Tsangaya, Mai Unguwa Tsangaya I; Gadau Tsangaya, Mai Unguwa Tsangaya II; Garin Gashi, Kofar Fada; Asageri, Kofar Fada; Nomari, Primary School; Nomari Yamma, Bakin Rijiya; Gizire Gana, Kofar Fada; Jan Kai, Rijiyar Hardo; Walai Gabas, Kofar Fada; Walai Yamma, Primary School; Abbari Gabas, Kofar Fada; Abbari Yamma, Primary School; Wasari, Kofar Fada; Atawari, Kofar Fada; Kubuwa, Kofar Fada; Gizire Babba, Kofar Fada; Malumawa Gabas, Kofar Fada; Malumawa Yamma, Primary School; Meledige Tsakiya, Bakin Dandali |
| Itas/Gadau | Kashuri | Yancheri, Kofar Fada; Surfe, Primary School; Gwadagon, Kofar Fada; Kanaderi, Kofar Fada; Gadan Jeji, Kofar Fada; Kanjawa, Kofar Fada; Galabuwa, Kofar Fada; Lizai, Primary School I; Lizai, Primary School II; Zayi, Kofar Fada; Bula, Kofar Fada; Garin Buraji, Kofar Fada; Kadage, Kofar Fada; Alagarno, Kofar Fada; Kashuri, Primary School; Kubuwa Gana, Kofar Pada; Katsinawa Kofar Fada; Malamawan Duhuwa Kofar Fada; Dinyan Kofar Fada |
| Itas/Gadau | Zubuki | Atafowa Fada Kofar Fada; Atafowa Fada, Village Head Office; Atafowa Unguwan Gambo Primary School; Atafowa Na Mai Gyada, Dispensary; Dunari Arewa, Primary School; Dunari Kudu, Kofar Fada; Buzayen Dunari, Kofar Fada; Sherifuri Gabas, Primary School; Sherifuri Yamma, Bakin Hanya; Sitti, Kofar Fada; Babu Wuri, Kofar Fada; Bakar Kuka, Primary School; Hadibiya, Kofar Fada; Babu Gudu, Primary School; Babu Gudu Yamma, Dispensary; Kuwar, Kofar Fada; Garin Malam, Primary School; Garin Malam, Kofar Fada; Maraku, Kofar Fada; Dakori/Nasarawa, Kofar Fada I; Dakori/Nasarawa, Kofar Fada II; Dakori Turmi, Primary School; Diga, Primary School; Makani, Kofar Fada; Mazai, Kofar Fada; Zubuki, Primary School; Zazai, Kofar Fada; Gamji, Kofar Fada; Gulmo, Kofar Fada; Majanjan, Kofar Fada; Majanjan, Jauro Adamu; Lutai, Kofar Fada; Damatsa, Kofar Fada |
| Jama'Are | Jama'Are A' | Shamaki, Library I; Shamaki, Library II; Hardori, A Gindin Kargo; Hardori, B Tsangayar J.; Tudun Wada, Youth Centre; Beguwa, Gindin Pampo; Galdima, A Moh'D W. Store; Yari Mari, Central Primary School |
| Jama'Are | Jama'Are B' | Horare, Horare Primary School I; Horare “A”, Horare Primary School II; Gabari, Vet. Clinic; Kofar Gabas, Primary School; Unguwar Alhaji; Unguwar Azizi, Abdul Primary School; Digiza, Kofar Jauro; Yolla - Yola, Y. Primary School; Jegoyel Kofar Jauro; Jabbori, Jabbori Primary School |
| Jama'Are | Jama'Are C' | Unguwan Tsamiya Mai Ungis House; Unguwan S. Fawa, Sarkin Fawa H.; Unguwar S. Fawa, Post Office; Unguwar Baure, Wazirin Aska House; Unguwar Ganneri, K. Primary School I; Unguwar Ganneri, K. Primary School II; Yangamai Primary School; Dako Dako Primary School; Ayas' Kofar Jauro |
| Jama'Are | Jama'Are D' | Zango, Abdulqadir Primary School I; Zango, Abdulqadir Primary School II; Nadadaruwa, Abdulqadir Primary School I; Nadadaruwa, Abdulqadir Primary School II; Agayari, Women Centre; Tsangayar, Tudun M. Dauda; Masama, Masam Primary School |
| Jama'Are | Dogon Jeji A' | Kofar Fada District Head I; Kofar Fada District Head II; Kofar Fada Opposite Guest House; Wudilawa, Unguwar Wudilawa; Wallawa, Primary School; Kofar Kudu, Kofar Kudu; Mukaddas Primary School, Primary School; Bakin Kasuwa, Bakin Kasuwa |
| Jama'Are | Dogon Jeji B' | Sabon Kafi, Primary School I; Sabon Kafi, Primary School II; Sabon Kafi, Dispensary; Boggajedda, K/Jauro House; Kayarda, K/Jauro House; Mabai, Primary School; Marmaji, Primary School; Dasgalwo, G/Ganji; Yalwa, Kofar Jauro |
| Jama'Are | Dogon Jeji C' | Gongo, Gongo Primary School I; Gongo, Gongo Primary School II; Gilar, Gilar Primary School I; Gilar, Gilar Primary School II; Gilar, Gilar Primary School III; Arewa, Arewa I; Arewa, Arewa II; Fatiske, H. Jauro |
| Jama'Are | Hanafari | Hanafari, Hanafari Primary School I; Hanafari, Hanafari Primary School II; Bundigi, Kofar Jauro Bala; Bundigi, Kofar Arewa; Wambiyo, Kofar Arewa; Buzuzu, Btw Lariya & Buzu; Luguji, Btw Lariya & Buzu; Guda, Guda Primary School I; Guda, Guda Primary School II; Bodinga, Bodinga Primary School I; Bodinga, Bodinga Primary School II; Lariye, Lariye Primary School; K. Koyafi, Btw Ku & Koy; Lariye, Dispensary; Kamaku, Primary School I; Kamaku, Primary School II; Kunjeri, Primary School I; Kunjeri, Primary School II; Kontamari, Primary School; Mamaheta, Gidan Jauro |
| Jama'Are | Galdimari | Galdimari, Primary School I; Galdimari, Primary School II; Yarimari, K/Jauro; Gadaramma, K/Jauro; Beddorgel, K/Jauro I; Beddorgel, K/Jauro II; Baburti, Dispensary; Changanawa, Dispensary; Sharaba, Primary School; Kata - Kata, Primary School; Majabun, Primary School; Jannowa, Kofar Jauro; Jambuwa, Kofar Jauro; Beggawo J. Buba, Kofar Jauro |
| Jama'Are | Jurara | Jurara, Primary School I; Jurara, Primary School II; Jurara, Primary School III; Fetere, Primary School; Kafin Dila, Kofar Jauro; Isari, G/Durawa A'; G/Babani, Dispensary I; G/Babani, Dispensary II; Kesowo, Primary School; Allah Yayi, Fako; Allah Yayi, K/Jauro; Kuduwo, K/Jauro |
| Katagum | Tsakuwa Kofar Gabas/ Kofar Kuka | Day Primary School, Day Primary School; Kofar Dan Chila Kowa - Kofar Dan Chila Kowa; Central Primary School, Central Primary School; Bye Pass, Kofar Dankawu; Kofar Mai Unguwa, Tsakuwa, Kofar Mai Unguwa; Masallachin Idi - Kofar M. Adamu Naibi; Fatara Primary School, Primary School; Kofar Bappaye Andubun, K/Bappaye; Kofar Malam Ayuba, Kofar Ayuba; Mai Farin Doki, Mai Farin Doki; Cabs Azare, Cabs; Kofar Malam Babba, Kofar Babba; Kofar Malam Jumba, K/Alkali Abdu; Kofar Malam Mahdi, Kofar Malam Mahdi; Kofar Wakili Garkuwa, Kofar Wakili Garkuwa; Kofar Sarkin Katagum, Kofar Sarkin Katagum; Town Maternity, Town Maternity; Rijiyar Kofar Gabas, Rijiyar Kofar Gabas; Rijiyar Suwajo, Rijiyar M. Suwajo; Kofar Sarkin Azare, Kofar Sarkin Azare; Ramin Kasa, Ramin Kasa; Kofar Waziri Babale, Kofar Waziri Babale I; Kofar Waziri Babale, Kofar Waziri Babale II; L. G. A. Garage, L. G. A. Garage; K. Babayon Gana, K. Babayon Gana; Kofar Umar Daura, Kofar Umar Daura; Kofar Shitu Mai Walda, Kofar Shitu Mai Walda; State Hotel, Azare State Hotel, Azare; Social Welfare, Social Welfare; Gidan Gandurobobi, Gidan Gandurobobi |
| Katagum | Nasarawa Bakin Kasuwa | Rijiyar Sarkin Kaji, Rijiyar Sarkin Kaji; K/Mustafa Mai Katifa, K/Mustafa; K/Alkali, Walulu, K/Alkali I; K/Alkali, Walulu, K/Alkali II; K/Shekarau Umar, K/Ahekarau; Kofar Bala Kuturu, Kofar Bala Kuturu I; Kofar Bala Kuturu, Kofar Bala Kuturu II; Kofar Dan Gombe, Kofar Dan Gombe; Kofar Madakin Doka, Kofar Madakin Doka; Kofar Ahmadu Gurji, Kofar Ahmadu; District Head Office, District Head Office; Kofar Shekarau Umar, Kofar Shekarau Umar; Gidan Television, Gidan Television; Kofar Nabawa Maroki, Kofar Nabawa I; Kofar Nabawa Maroki, Kofar Nabawa II; Water Board, Water Board; Nasarawa East Primary School, Nasarawa East Primary School I; Nasarawa East Primary School, Nasarawa East Primary School II; Nasarawa East Primary School, Nasarawa East Primary School III; K/Gwani Alaramma, K/Gwani Alaramma; Bakoshi Primary School, Bakoshi Primary School I; Bakoshi Primary School, Bakoshi Primary School II; Bakoshi Primary School, Bakoshi Primary School III; Medical Store, Medical Store; Kofar Sarkin Molo, Kofar Sarkin Molo; Shakatafi Dispensary, Shakatafi Dispensary; C. O. E. Annex, C. O. E. Annex; Nas. West Primary School, Nas. West Primary School I; Nas. West Primary School, Nas. West Primary School II; Nas. West Primary School, Nas. West Primary School III; Kofar Galadiman Dawa, Kofar Galadiman Dawa; Kofar Wakili Duba, Kofar Wakili Duba; Kofar Alhaji Maigoro, Kofar Alhaji Maigoro; Kofar Alhaji Yadu, Kofar Alhaji Yadu; Kofar Musa Makenza, Kofar Musa Makenza; Kofar Adamu, Kofar Adamu Umar; L. G. Vete, L. G. Vette; Army Children School, Army Children School; Kofar Alfa Tatu, Kofar Alfa Tatu; Kofar Alhaji Jamma, Kofar Alhaji Jamma; Urban Maternity, Urban Maternity; Islamiya School, Islamiya School; Kasuwar Kaji, Kasuwar Kaji- I; Kasuwar Kaji, Kasuwar Kaji - II; Kasuwar Kaji, Kofar Sule Dan Makera; Amb. Dandada, Amb. Dandada; Rijiyar Yan Wanki, Rijiyar Yan Wanki I; Rijiyar Yan Wanki, Rijiyar Yan Wanki II; Mai Unguwa Garba Jajaja, Mai Unguwa Garba Jajaja; Kofar Sarkin Malamai, Kofar Sarkin Malamai; Kofar Dauda Sarauta, Kofar Dauda Sarauta; Ibrahim Maidoya - Kofar Ibrahim Mai Doya |
| Katagum | Madangala | Madangala Primary School, Primary School; Madangala Fada, Kofar Fada; Kujuru Primary School, Primary School; Kujuru Fada, Kofar Fada; Kujuru, Kujuru Dispensary; Chara-Chara Fada; Bangaza Kofar Fada, Kofar Jauro; C. O. E. Azare, C. O. E. Azare; Gursoli, Gursoli; Shagori, Shagori; Duhuwa, Kofar Jauro; Bagaja, Kofar Jauro; Charachara Primary School, Primary School; W. T. C., Gate Way; Chinlankori, Kofar Jauro; Bidawa, Kofar Sarki; Kakudi/Govt. College, Kofar Sarki; Matsango, Bakin Karofi; Matsango K/Mallam Sabo, K/Mallam Sabo; Matsango K/Mallam Bashari, K/Mallam Bashari; Matsango Dorawa Uku Dabarwulli; Matsango Dorowa Uku; Government Day School, Gate Way; State Low Cost, State Low Cost; Yakeri, Kofar Jauro |
| Katagum | Madara | Madara District Head's Office, District Head's Office; Madara Primary School, Primary School I; Madara Primary School, Primary School II; Madara K/Sarki, Kofar Fada; Madara Tsangaya, Tsangaya; Galadimari, Kofar Jauro; Bakatamari, Kofar Jauro; Jumberi, Kofar Jauro; Dunari, Kofar Jauro; Kaluluwa, Kofar Jauro; Katuri, Kofar Jauro; Lariski Primary School, Primary School; Lariski K/Fada, Kofar Fada; Goron Kawo, Kofar Fada; Dalli, Kofar Fada |
| Katagum | Buskuri | Buskuri Primary School, Primary School; Buskuri Fada, Kofar Fada; Gadawa, Kofar Jauro; Adabasha, Kofar Jauro; Walowa, Kofar Jauro; Jugga, Kofar Jauro; Bimadiyel, Kofar Jauro; Dargazu, Kofar Jauro; Maudi, Kofar Jauro; Maluri, Kofar Jauro; Jatam, Kofar Jauro; Gurwari, Kofar Jauro; Saleri, Kofar Jauro; Barkeji, Kofar Jauro; Gaba'I, Kofar Jauro; Jajibali, Kofar Jauro |
| Katagum | Ragwam/Magonshi | Ragwam Primary, Primary School1; Ragwam Kofar Fada, Kofar Fada; Ragwan Tsangaya, Tsangaya; Magonshi Primary School, Primary School; Magomshi Kofar Fada, Kofar Fada; Duhuwar Kura Primary School, Primary School; Garin Mai Kuraye, Kofar Jauro; Duhuwa Fada, Kofar Fada; Garin Kauli, Kofar Fada; Jigawar Taura, Kofar Sarki; Jigawar Taura Wuyin, Kofar Sarki; Galabur, Kofar Sarki; Gwasamai Primary School, Primary School; Gwasamai Fada, Kofar Fada; Lafiya Primary School, Primary School; Lafiya Fada, Kofar Fada; Manini, Kofar Jauro; Mazai Kofar Jauro; Gaude, Kofar Jauro; Zuramai Primary School, Primary School; Nakki, Kofar Jauro; Duzun, Kofar Jauro; Kachawunje, Kofar Jauro |
| Katagum | Gambaki/Bidir | Gambaki Primary School, Gambaki Primary School; Gambaki Tsakiya, Gambaki Tsakiya; Dangazori, Kofar Jauro; Bunagarai, Kofar Jauro; Degatabumi, Kofar Jauro; Chinbulau, Kofar Jauro; Gambaki K/Fada, Kofar Fada I; Gambaki K/Fada, Kofar Fada II; Adamoyel Primary School, Primary School; Adamoyel K/Fada, K/Fada; Ganji, Kofar Fada I; Ganji, Kofar Fada II; Wuro Burno, Kofar Jauro; Kawaga, Kofar Jauro; Dikkoli, Kofar Jauro; Bidir Primary School, Primary School; Bidir Fada, Kofar Fada; Yarimari, Kofar Jauro; Bokki, Kofar Jauro; Bubari, Kofar Jauro; Bazar, Kofar Jauro; Jabbal, Kofar Jauro; Kachawunje K/Jauro I; Kachawunje K/Jauro II; Mareri, Kofar Jauro; Tudun Wada, Kofar Jauro; Kwanjin Kwandori, Kofar Jauro; Katanga, Kofar Jauro |
| Katagum | Chinade | District Head Office, District Head Office I; District Head Office, District Head Office II; Maternity Chinade, Maternity; Chinade Primary School, Primary School; Yolawo, Kofar Fada; Yankin Kudu, Kofar Fada I; Yankin Kudu, Kofar Fada II; Lafiyawo, Lafiyawo; Garin Ganji, Kofar Sarki; Ganduha, Kofar Jauro; Yankin Arewa, Yankin Arewa; Tudun Wada, Tudun Wada I; Tudun Wada, Tudun Wada II; Fawari Sabo Gari, Primary School; Kare Saleri, Kofar Jauro; Hautango, Kofar Jauro; Albaba, Kofar Jauro; Baddere, Kofar Jauro |
| Katagum | Bulkachuwa/Dagaro | Kofar Fada, Kofar Fada I; Kofar Fada, Kofar Fada II; Primary School, Primary School; Kofar Alhaji Adamu, Kofar Alhaji Adamu I; Kofar Alhaji Adamu, Kofar Alhaji Adamu II; Kofar Sarkin Tasha, Sarkin Tasha I; Kofar Sarkin Tasha, Sarkin Tasha II; Dugunde, Kofar Jauro; Chinkani, Kofar Jauro; Nainawa, Kofar Jauro; Kofar Fada Busuri, Kofar Fada; Busuri Primary School, Primary School; Madiri, Kofar Fada; Kogga, Kofar Fada; Dagaro Tsohuwa, Kofar Jauro; Alamari, Kofar Jauro; Sauke, Kofar Jauro; Bulturi, Kofar Jauro; Saleri, Kofar Jauro; Barkeji, Kofar Jauro; Magarya, Kofar Jauro; Kukoki Bundaye, Kofar Jauro; Bacciri Primary School, Primary School; Bacciri Kofar Fada, Kofar Fada; Ganji Garin Mamuda, Kofar Jauro; Jira Jango, Kofar Jauro; Kyaulori, Kofar Jauro; Ganji Bulaibu, Kofar Jauro |
| Katagum | Yayu | Yayu Primary School, Primary School; Yayu Yamma, Yayu Yamma; Yayu Fada, Kofar Fada; Yayu Turaki, Yayu U. Turaki; Rabi Babba, Kofar Jauro; Rabi Modi, Kofar Jauro I; Rabi Modi, Kofar Jauro II; Yayari, Kofar Jauro; Gari Loli, Kofar Jauro; Chacharam, Kofar Jauro; Belaku, Kofar Jauro; Lemari, Kofar Jauro; Gnadaga, Kofar Jauro; Haram, Kofar Jauro; Ganjiyo, Kofar Jauro |
| Katagum | Madachi/Gangai | Madachi Primary School; Madachi Kofar Fada, Kofar Fada I; Madachi Kofar Fada, Kofar Fada II; Yalwa, Kofar Sarki; Kae Lwo, Kofar Sarki; Horare, Kofar Sarki; Gabo, Kofar Sarki; Kare, Kofar Sarki; Masakun, Kofar Sarki; Belataba, Kofar Sarki; Gangai Pri. Sch.; Gangai K/Fada, Kofar Fada; Jalaje, Kofar Sarki; Dummemi, Kofar Sarki; Madilmo, Kofar Sarki; Majauwa, Kofar Sarki; Dagayari, Kofar Sarki; Kafin Makama, Kofar Sarki; Jambure, Kofar Sarki; Zindi, Kofar Sarki; Kafin Sako, Kofar Sarki; Gurwari, Kofar Sarki; Gangai Tsakiya, Gangai Tsakiya |
| Kirfi | Badara | Ung. Ajiya, B. S. A. P. Badara; Badara East, Primary School Badara; Badara West, Primary School Badara; Badara Yarima, Ung. Yarima; Baba North, Kofar Sarki - I; Baba North, Kofar Sarki - II; Baba South, Kofar M. Ung.; Hardo Bakari, Kofar Hardo; Badawaire, Badawaire; Gorondo, Kofar Sarki; Kunbin Fulani, Kofar Hardo; Dambori Primary School I; Dambori Pri. Sch. II; Dambori, Primary School; Mainari, Kofar Sarki; Kesu, Kofar Sarki |
| Kirfi | Bara | Bara Central, Village Head Office; Bara Central, Kofar Sarki/Yaki Bara; Bara Central, Primary School I; Bara Central, Primary School II; Bara Central, Primary School III; Hashidu, Kofar Sarkin Hashidu; Yalwan Bara, Kofar Sarki; Lomin Fulani, Primary School I; Lomin Fulani, Primary School II; Sunkani, Kofar Sarki; Lariski, Primary School; Lakau, Kofar Sarki; Kadolli, Primary School; Buren Tafida, Kofar Sarki Tafida; Jada, Kofar Sarki; Jimbam, Kofar Sarki Jimbim; Kalajanga, Primary School; Kalajanga B Ung. Sale Mai Maciji; Tashan Turmi, Kofar Sarki Turmi |
| Kirfi | Beni A' | Beni, Primary School I; Beni, Primary School II; Kwojolewa, Kofar Sarki; Balan Kanawa, J. S. S. B/Kanawa; Balan Kanawa East, Primary School; Najawa, Kofar Sarki; Ginja, Kofar Sarki; Jauro Sani, Kofar Salihi; Gaka Kofar Sarki Gaka I; Gaka Kofar Sarki Gaka II; Sharaba, Kofar Sarki Gaka; Bunduru/Badaki, Kofar Sarki Badaki |
| Kirfi | Beni B' | Guyaba East, Primary School I; Guyaba West, Primary School II; Guyaba West, Primary School III; Takkira, Kofar Sarki Takkira; Denga, Kofar Sarki Takkira; Jauro Hammari, Kofar Jauro; Kagalan/Woso, Kofar Sarki |
| Kirfi | Dewu Central | Dewu, Dewu Primary School I; Dewu, Dewu Primary School II; Wudil West, Kofar Sarki; Wudil East, Kofar Alahaji Bako; Kesu Dabo, Alhaji Dabo; Riban Garmu, Primary School; Riban Garmu East, Kofar Sarki; Jauro, Abare Kofar Sarki; Kalamboli, Kofar Sarki; Boli Fada, Primary School; Boli East, Kofar Sarki; Kafin Turaki, Kofar Sarki |
| Kirfi | Dewu East | Kafin Iya, Primary School I; Kafin Iya, Primary School II; Hardo Bawa, Kofar Hardo Bawa; Bukkaji, Kofar Bukkaji; Guzan Amadu, Kofar Sarki; Wuro Gumbal, Kofar Sarki; Golo, Kofar Sarki- I; Golo, Kofar Sarki -II; Gula, Kofar Sarki; Guzan Sarkiwo, Kofar Sarki; Gaduji South, Kofar Sarki; Gaduji North, Kofar Mai Ung.; Gagiro, Kofar Sarki |
| Kirfi | Kirfi | Kirfin Kasa East, District Head Office; Kirfi Central, Primary School; Kirfi West, Kofar Mai Ung.; Kirfin Sama, Primary School; Ung. Yerima, Kofar Sarki; Zamani, K/Sarki Zamani; Bullokko, Kofar Sarki; Zagaina, Kofar Sarki; Sharifuri Primary School I; Sharifuri Primary School II; Kwagal, Primary School; Ung. Ada, Kofar Sarki- I; Ung. Ada, Kofar Sarki - II; Ung. Sarkin Aska, Kofar Sarkin Aska; Jagalwa, Kofar Sarkin Jagalwa; Kaloma, Primary School; Bage, Kofar Sarki; Warra, Kofar Waziri |
| Kirfi | Shango | Shango, Primary School; Feshingo, Kofar Sarki; Bure East, Primary School; Bure West, Kofar Sarkin Bure; Ambara, Kofar Sarkin Ambara; Goriyo, Kofar Sarki; Jaro, Kofar Sarki; Bogo, Kofar Sarkin Bogo; Kafin Galadima, Kofar Mai Ung.; Ung. Sarkin Yaki, Kofar Sarkin Yaki; Kofar Alhaji Gurama, Kofar Alhaji Gurama; Wuro Chitta, Kofar S/Wuro Chitta; Kilari, Kofar Sarki |
| Kirfi | Tubule | Kwala Ganjuwa, Kofar Sarki; Kwala Bureje, Kofar Sarki; Ziryolo, Kofar Sarki; Tubule, Primary School I; Tubule, Primary School II; Zangoma, Kofar Sarki; Dega, Kofar Sarki |
| Kirfi | Wanka | Wanka North, Kofar Madaki; Wanka Central, Kofar S/Wanka I; Wanka Central, Kofar S/Wanka II; Wanka South, Primary School; Kesun Bello, Kofar Sarki; Magaba, Kofar Sarki; Cheledi Fada, Kofar Sarki-I; Cheledi Fada, Kofar Sarki -II; Cheledi South, Kofar Alhaji Naliye; Cheledi Central, Kofar Liman; Sindigawo, Kofar Jauro; Sindigawo A Kofar Wuro Denga; Peltum, Kofar Sarkin Peltum; Bedoji, Kofar Sarkin Bedoji; Taure, Kofar Sarkin Taure |
| Misau | Zadawa | Chiroma, Kofar Dattijo; Barwa, Zadawa Primary School; Kinchi, Zadawa Primary School; Kago, Kofar Samaila Ile; Shayel, Kofar Jauro Ahmadu; Nammare, Nammare Primary School; Karewo, Kofar Jauro Karewo; Malunje, Kofar Jauro Malunje; Suddure, Kofar Wakili Sale; Yubade, Kofar Sarkin Yubade; Galadima, Zadawa Dispensary; Fagurum, Kofar Sarkin Fagurum; Dunkurmi, Dunkurmi Primary School I; Dunkurmi, Dunkurmi Primary School II; Amardi, Kofar Jauron Amardi; Jogogulo, Konzogo Primary School; Konzogo, Konzogo Primary School; Alako, Kofar Alhaji Isa; Galalan, Kan-Burtali; Jokamre, Kan-Burtali; Ultitingo, Kofar Wakili Saleh; Damata, Damata Primary School; Ngaya, Kofar Jauron Ngaya; Boggawo, Boggawo Primary School |
| Misau | Jarkasa | Jarkasa, Jarkasa Primary School; Madagin, Kofar Jauron Madagin; Idayo, Rijiyar Mallam Chindo; Lizai, Kofar Jauron Lizai; Yangale/Digciga Sabon Sara Primary School; Gauya, Kofar Jauron Gauya; Kafin Arguma, K/M Arguma; Chogoro, Chogoro Primary School; Jabdo Yamma, Jabdo Primary School; Jabdo Gabas, Kofar Jauro Jabdo; Goron Kari Kofar Jauro; Lauru Kofar Jauro; Fulatan, Fulatan Jauro Belahi; Belahi, Kofar Jauro Umaru; Durfa/Kewal, Kofar Jauro Umaru; Dunguzawa, Kofar Jauro Buwako |
| Misau | Kukadi/Gundari | Zagibadari, District Head Office Misau; Zagibadari, Town Maternity Misau; Laggori Kofar Abdu Diresa I; Laggori Kofar Abdu Diresa II; Bakin Kasuwa, Sabon Gari Primary School; Sabon Gari, Sabon Gari Primary School I; Sabon Gari, Sabon Gari Primary School II; Kukadi, Sabon Gari Primary School; Police Barracks, K/Moh. Kar Keso I; Police Barracks, K/Moh. Kar Keso II; T. C/Chabai, Teachers College; Kiri Kassamma, Kofar Jauron Bura Kaku; Malumawa, Kofar Jauro Bala; Tasha, Veterninary Clinic Misau I; Tasha, Veterninary Clinic Misau II; Jajadi, Fawari Primary School I; Jajadi, Fawari Primary School II; Fawari, Fawari Primary School I; Fawari, Fawari Primary School II; Guburi, Fawari Primary School; Kesala, Kesala Dispensary I; Kesala, Kesala Dispensary II; Barmani, Fawari Primary School; Bangarti Kofar Jauro, Bangarti; Fadangu, Fadangu Primary School; Emirs Palace, Emirs Palace I; Emirs Palace, Emirs Palace II; Mangari, Mangari Primary School I; Mangari, Mangari Primary School II; Gaduram/Aftaka, Aftaka Primary School; Dawa/Gabdori, Gabdori Primary School; Alanga Wari, Kofar Jauron Alangawari; Tamsuri, Misau Central Primary School I; Tamsuri, Misau Central Primary School II |
| Misau | Ajilin/Gugulin | Ajili/Samadawo, Ajili Primary School; Gargawa, Kofar Jauro Gargawa; Wuro Bogga, Kofar Jauro Banta; Zindi, Zindi Primary School; Bauta, Kofar Jauro Bauta; Tumfure, Kofar Jauro Tumfure; Gandure/D. Kasuwa, Dunkwi Kasuwa Primary School; Dunkwi Ambi, Dunkwi Ambi Primary School I; Dunkwi Ambi, Dunkwi Ambi Primary School II; Doleri/Kalala, Kalala Primary School; Rigar Busa, Kofar Jauro, Rigar Busa; Babuwari, Kofar Jauron Rigar Busa; Ngumachame, Kofar Jauron Ngumachame; Gugulin, Gugulin Primary School I; Gugulin, Gugulin Primary School II; Gaina Ali, Kofar Jauro Gaina Ali; Gaina Fulani, Gaina Fulani Primary School I; Gaina Fulani, Pry Sch.; Balen Hausa, Balen Hausa Primary; Balen Fulani, Kofar Jauro; Ganjin Kwando, Kofar Jauro; Agurdi, Agurdi Primary School; Sammadawo, Kofar Jauro; Diggeri, Diggeri Village; Rigar Jeji/Gurduba, Rigar Jeji Village |
| Misau | Tofu | Tofu, Tofu Primary School; Dallari I, Dallari Primary School; Dallari II, Dallari Primary School; Fagurdi, Kofar Jauro Fagurdi; Bajinji, Kofar Jauron Bajinji; Jabalya, Jabalya Primary School; Jabalya Arewa, Kofar Jauron Jabalya Arewa; Jabalya Dutse, Kofar Jauron Jabalya Arewa; Bawarin, Kofar Jauron Bawarin; Lafiya, Kofar Jauron Lafiya; Sebore, Kofar Jauron Sebore; Gambula I, Kofar Jauron M. Barnoma; Gambula A Kofar Jauron Mainawari; Halayidi, Gidan Bature; Gambara, Kofar Wakili |
| Misau | Hardawa | Bayi I, Kofar Fada Hardawa; Bayi II, Kofar Sarkin Kasuwa; Gawo Central, Kofar Danjebu; Gawo East, Kofar H/Ladi; Gantsa Kofar M. Nuhu; Dutse, Hardawa Primary School; Marna, Kusa Da Gada; Rimi Central, K/Nasaye; Rimi, Hardawa C. P. School; Bachin, K/Mai Ung. Amale; Rigar Waje, Old Barrack Prison; Kurbawa Arewa I, K/Mai Ang. S. Tike; Kurbawa Arewa A, K/Mai Alewa; Kurbawa Kudu, Guest House; G. G. S. S., G. G. S. S. Hardawa; Federal Lowcost, K/Abdu Gudugu; Kafin Yamma, Kofar Juji Tela; Kafin Gabas, Makeran Kaila; Ung. Sakkwatawa, K/Alhaji Adamu Balai |
| Misau | Sarma/Akuyam | Sarma, Sarma Primary School; Dabura/Abuaboye, K/J/Dabura; Dabugai, Kofar Adamu; Wuro Dan Goggo, Kofar W/Dan Goggo; Dogo Lanzai Gabas, Yeddere Primary School; Taskai, Kofar Jauro Taskai; Yelwa, Kofar Sarkin Yalwa; Kafin Zakka, Kofar Zakka Primary School; Baya Banza, Kofar Jauro Baya Banza; Garin Boyiwa, Garin Boyiwa Primary School; Garin Makera, Garin Makera Primary School; Gaudo/Dawaya, Kofar Sarkin Gaudo; Ung. Galadima, Kofar M. Galadima; Ung. Madaki, Kofar Madaki; Unguwar Tafida, Rijiyar Ajango; Malumawa/Bayi, Kofgar Jauron Bayi- I; Malumawa/Bayi, Kofgar Jauron Bayi- II; Gogel, Gogel Primary School; Dugurma/Jahunawa, Kofar Jauro Dugurguwa; Kukadi, Akuyam Central Primary School I; Kukadi, Akuyam Central Primary School II; Galawa/Sheni, Galawa Central Primary School; Kamfata, Kamfata Central Primary School; Badakoshi, Kofar Jauro Badakoshi |
| Misau | Sirko | Sirko/Luggudi, Primary School; Challudi/Dawa, Kofar Jauro Fongi; Fongi/Takadinga, Kofar Jauro Fongi; Malumri/Dabji, Dabji Primary School; Changanawa/Dako, Kofar Jauron Dako; Danpisa/Gangir, Danpisa Primary School; Jallori/Bulum, Kofar Jauro Bulum; Waliya Gabas/W. Yamma, Waliya Primary School |
| Ningi | Ningi | Unguwar Mairiga, Emir's Palace; Tsamiya, Kofar Gwarmi- I; Tsamiya, Kofar Gwarmi- II; Unguwar Sarkin Fawa, K/Alhaji Abdu Yaro; Unguwar Sarkin Fawa, Kofar Mai Unguwa; Unguwar Sarkin Fawa, Rijiyar Shanu; Unguwar Yunusa, Kofar Alhaji Abbas; Sangara K/Malam Aibu; Manu Manu Primary School; Unguwar Wawa, Kofar Mai Unguwa; Unguwar Abdu, Gaude K/Adamu A; Bunasai I, Information Centre; Bunasai II, Post Office; T/S Gari Ningi I, Kofar Danlamire; T/S Gari Ningi II, Kofar Danlamire; T/Mai Kumsa, Kofar Alaramma; Unguwar Habu, Central Primary School I; Unguwar Habu, Central Primary School II; Unguwar Habu, Central Primary School III; Unguwar Habu, Kofar Mai Unguwa I; Unguwar Habu, Kofar Mai Unguwa II; Ardo Madaki K/Hardo Madaki; Zidanga, Zidanga Primary School; Unguwar Kallamu, Maiturare Primary School I; Unguwar Kallamu, Maiturare Primary School II; Kafin Danyaya, Kofar Liman; Baki Kofar, Mai Unguwa; Unguwar Kallamu, Maiturare Primary School III; Kafin Danyaya II, Kofar Tela Manya |
| Ningi | Dingis | Dingis Kofar Mai Unguwa; Rumbu, Rumbu Primary School; Unguwar Yaki, Kofar Mai Yaki; Kafin Chakuna, K/Chakuna Primary School; Hardo H/Tuwash, K/Mai Unguwa T.; Padina, Kofar Mai Unguwa; Katsinawa, Kofar Mai Unguwa I; Katsinawa, Kofar Mai Unguwa II; Katsinawa, Kofar Mai Unguwa III; Tsiro, Kofar Hardo Tsiro; Dangawa C Kofar Hardo Chindako; Gwam I, Gwam Primary School; Gwam II, Gwam Primary School; G/H Isa H/B Alaramma; Gwam III, Kofar Inuwa Gwam; Gwam Tsangaya, Kofar Alaramma; Hardo Halilu, Kofar Mai Unguwa; Madore Kofar Mai Unguwa; Unguwar A. Garba, Kofar Mai Unguwa; Rufa'I Kofar Mai Unguwa; Hardo Sale, Kofar Hardo Sale |
| Ningi | Nasaru | Tsangaya Dispensary; Nasaru, Nasaru Primary School I; Nasaru, Nasaru Primary School II; Hardo Mamman, K/Hardo Mamman; Zazikai, I, Kofar Mai Unguwa; Zazika II, Kofar Mai Unguwa; Hardo Lagga, Kofar Hardo Lagga; Gazagi I, Kofar Mai Unguwa; Gazagi II, Maternity; Gazagi III, Maternity; Dankomi I, Kofar Mai Unguwa; Dankomi II, Kofar Mai Unguwa; Digawa, Kofar Mai Unguwa; Hardo Gagare, Kofar Hardo Gagare; Duka Biya I, Kofar Mai Unguwa; Duka Biya II, Kofar Gidan Yaki; Duka Biya III, Kofar Gidan Yaki; Unguwar Galidima I, Kofar Galadima; Unguwar Galadima II, Kofar Galadima; Madaki, Kofar Madaki; Hardo Musa, Kofar Hardo Musa; Sharaf Kofar Mai Unguwa; Hardo Chindo I, Kofar Hardo Chindo; Lamunde Kofar Mai Unguwa; Hardo Chindo II, Kofar Hardo Dambo; Gidan Baki II, Gidan Baki Primary School; Hardo Idi I, Kofar Mai Unguwa; Hardo Idi II, Kofar Mai Unguwa; Hardo Fitininga, Kofar Hardo; Hardo Umaru Gardo I, Kofar Umaru Gardo; Hardo Umaru Gardo II, Kofar Umaru Gardo; Hardo Joji, Kofar Hardo Joji; Gardo, Gardo Primary School |
| Ningi | Jangu | Kafin Zaki, Kafin Zaki Primary School; Kujara, Kofar Mai Unguwa; Ari I, District Office; Ari II, District Office; Dogon Ruwa, Kofar Mai Unguwa; Hardo Boso, Kofar Hardo Boso; Gada, Dispensary; T/Unguwar Yara, Kofar Mai Unguwa Yara; Gongo Kofar Mai Unguwa; Zakara, Zakara Primary School; T/M /T/Tela, Kofar Alaramma; T/Marke, Kofar Alhaji Garba; Baure, Kofar Mai Unguwa; Matsai, Kofar Mai Unguwa |
| Ningi | Balma | Kauyen R/K, Primary School; D. Bauna /L/I, Kofar Idau; Unguwar Y/U/I, Kofar Mai Unguwa; K/F/U. Ya'U Inuwa, Kofar Mai Unguwa; Jargabar Balma, Kofar Alhaji Kadiri; Bakin Dutse, Kofar Mai Unguwa; Taka Lafiya, Kofar Mai Unguwa; Baturi, Kofar Mai Unguwa; Hardo, L/B/B Kofar Hardo Lamido; Kyanan Alhaji, Kofar Mai Unguwa; Agotoma I, Kofar Mai Unguwa; Agotoma II, Kofar Mai Unguwa; Halumbe Kofar Mai Unguwa; Iyayi Kofar Mai-Unguwa; Kongoro, Kofar Mai Unguwa; Jirgagu, Kofar Mai Unguwa; Hardo Jika, Kofar Hardo Jika; L/Manangara, Kofar Mai Unguwa; Silliya, Silliya Primary School; Hardo Wake, K/M Makeri; Unguwar Tuwul, Kofar Mai Unguwa; Hardo Babare I, Kofar Ahmad Gafara; Hardo Babare II, Kofar Ahmad Gafara; Hardo Gani, Kofar Hardo Gani; Unguwar Tanimu, Kofar Mai Unguwa; Unguwar Tanimu, T. Buzu Unguwar Tanimu Buzu |
| Ningi | Kudu / Yamma | Betu I, Kofar Mai Unguwa; Betu II, Kofar Mai Unguwa; B/B Unguwar M. Kofar Mai Unguwa; Marken Jata, Kofar Mai Unguwa; Makanwa, Kofar Mai Unguwa; Unguwar G/U/W, Kofar Mai Unguwa; Lumbu, Kofar Waziri; Hardo Mamman I, Kofar Mai Unguwa; Hardo Mamman II, Kofar Mai Unguwa; Y/Zuwi, Kofar Mai Unguwa; Rafin Chiyawa, Kofar Mai Unguwa; Mara, Kofar Mai Unguwa; Unguwar Makeri, Kofar Makeri; Dogon Ruwa, Kofar Mai Unguwa; Bakartumbe, Kofar Mai Unguwa; Jimi I, Jimi Primary School; Jimi II, Jimi Primary School; Taka Lafiya, Kofar Mai Unguwa; Unguwar Dabo, Kofar Mai Unguwa; L/L Yamma, Kofar Mai Unguwa; Rakama, Kofar Mai Unguwa; Tabula, Tabula Primary School; Katsinawa/G, Kofar Mai Unguwa; Katsinawa, Kofar Mai Alaranma; Wanka/Babare, Kofar Mai Unguwa; Unguwar Galadima, Kofar Mai Unguwa; Hardo Wada I, Kofar Hardo Wada; Hardo Wada II, Kofar Hardo Wada |
| Ningi | Tiffi / Guda | Zida, Kofar Mallam Ibrahim; Tiffi Tsohuwa, Kofar Sarkin Tiffi; Tiffi Sabuwa I, Kofar Dan'Azumi Tela; Tiffi Sabuwa II, Kofar Dan'Azumi Tela; Wushi, Tiffi Primary School; Unguwar Shu, Aibu T., Kofar Maigida Yakubu; H/Y Kawari, Kofar Gidan Hardo; Siri, Siri Primary School; Gwada, Kofar Mai Unguwa; Hardo Tashi, Kofar Hardo Tashi; Guda, Guda Primary School; Tsangayar Marke, Kofar Mai Unguwa; Kwarangwadi, Primary School; Yalwa, Kofar Mai Unguwa; Unguwar Tudu, Kofar Mai Unguwa; M/Wushi, Kofar Mai Unguwa Wushi; Tsangayar Maje, Maje Primary School; Unguwar M. Jakin, Kofar Ayuba |
| Ningi | Burra / Kyata | Burra Kofar Fada, District Head Office; Burra, Burra Primary School; K/B/Kasuwa, Kofar Banso; Budugu, Kofar Sarkin Fawa; Unguwar Kanawa, Kofar Jibrin; M/B/G/ I/II, Magami Primary School; Magami A/S II, Magami Primary School; Injau, Kofar Mai Unguwa; Wumba, Kofar Mai Unguwa; Bingilabo/Teri, Kofar Mai Unguwa; K/Galadima, Kyata Primary School; Kyata II, Kofar A. Abdu; Kyata III, K/G Sarkin Kyata; Dubure, Zahi Sarkin Kyata; Dangarafa, Kofar Mai Unguwa; Panna Gongola, Kofar Mai Unguwa; Panna Deru, Panna Primary School; Tudun Jarkoya, T/J Primary School; Sabuwar Kaura, Kofar Mai Unguwa; Tipchi, Tipchi Primary School; Marke / Mintsira, Kofar Mai Unguwa; Tudun Wada, Kofar Mai Unguwa |
| Ningi | Sama | Gamadoro, Kofar Mai Unguwa; Tulugu, Kofar Mai Unguwa; Galadima Kofar Galadima; Rimi I, Kofar Mai Unguwa; Rimi II, Kofar Mai Unguwa; Bambarai, Kofar Mai Unguwa; K/Kadage, Kofar Mai Unguwa; Yada Gungume, Y/G Primary School I; Yada Gungume, Y/G Primary School II; Y/Hausawa, Unguwar Hausawa; Rafin Dinya, Kofar Mai Unguwa; Isawa, Kofar Mai Unguwa; Kere, Kofar Mai Unguwa; Kumba, Kofar Mai Unguwa; Sunkuye, Kofar Mai Unguwa; Kajala, Kajala Primary School; Hayin Muna, T/Tsamiya; Kwangi I, Kwangi Primary School; Kwangi II, Kofar Sarki; Baradawo, Kofar Mai Unguwa; Dafara, Kofar Mai Unguwa; Bom Kofar Mai Unguwa; Rumbu, Kofar Mai Unguwa; Gamadoro Kofar Mai Unguwa; Kwangoro, Kofar Mai Unguwa |
| Ningi | Bashe | Bashe I, Bashe Primary School; Bashe II, Bashe Primary School; Bashe III, Kofar Sarkin Fawa; Diwa Kofar Mai Unguwa I; Diwa, Kofar Mai Unguwa II; Farda, Kofar Mai Unguwa; Hayen Doka, Kofar Mai Unguwa; Parda Borkono, Kofar Mai Unguwa; Unguwar Ganye, Kofar Mai Unguwa; Madaki, Kofar Mai Unguwa; Tamba, Kofar Mai Unguwa; Darba Baga, Kofar Mai Unguwa; Ringaya, Kofar Mai Unguwa; Kafin Lemo I, Maternity; Kafin Lemo II, Kofar Mai Unguwa; Kafin Lemo III, Kofar Mai Unguwa; K/Lemo Lure, Kofar Mai Unguwa; Tudun Wada, Kofar Mai Unguwa; Hardo Ori, Kofar Gidan Hardo; Agwarmaje West, Agwarmaje Primary School; Agwarmaje East, Kofar Mai Unguwa; Awudulawa, Kofar Mai Unguwa; Hardo Kwaire I, Kofar Hardo; Hardo Kwaire II, Kofar Hardo; Madafa I, Kofar Mai Unguwa; Madafa II, Kofar Mai Unguwa; Shuwaki, East Shuwaki Primary School; Shuwaki, West Shuwaki Primary School; Katsinawa, Kofar Mai Unguwa; Musussuka, Kofar Mai Unguwa I; Musussuka, Kofar Mai Unguwa II; Mhakaleme, Kofar Mai Unguwa; Andurya, Kofar Mai Unguwa; Zur, Kofar Mai Unguwa |
| Ningi | Kurmi | Gwandabi I, Gwandabi Primary School; Gwandabi II, Gwandabi Primary School; Gwandabi III, Gwandabi Primary School; Nabarma, Kofar Mai Unguwa; Mazai, Kofar Mai Unguwa; Ruwan Dinya, Kofar Mai Unguwa; Galadima, Kurmi Primary School; Chiroma, Kofar Sarkin Kurmi; Kufi, Kofar Mai Unguwa; Kuluki, Kofar Mai Unguwa; Shande, Kofar Mai Unguwa; Tara, Kofar Mai Unguwa; Dana, Kofar Mai Unguwa; Jigawa, Kofar Mai Unguwa; Zangai I, Kofar Mai Unguwa; Zangai II, Kofar Mai Unguwa; Zangai Unguwa B., Kofar Mai Unguwa; Gara I, Kofar Mai Unguwa; Gara II, Kofar Mai Unguwa; Jargaba, Kofar Mai Unguwa; Madaki, Kofar Madaki; Fachali, Kofar Mai Unguwa; Unguwar Kada, Kofar Mai Unguwa; Ramanu, Kofar Mai Unguwa; Betu Ganji Dispensary; Gaji I, Kofar Mai Unguwa; Gaji II, Kofar Mai Unguwa; Unguwar Buba I, Kofar Mai Unguwa; Unguwar Buba II, Kofar Mai Unguwa; Banga I, Kofar Mai Unguwa; Banga II, Kofar Mai Unguwa |
| Shira | Andubun | Andubun Gabas, Primary School; Andubun Kudu, O. P. H.; Goga, Primary School; Dawakeri, Kofar Fada; Dushin, Kofar Fada; Ka'El, Kofar Fada; Dangoli, Kofar Fada; Dundubus, Kofar Fada; Shabewa, Kofar Fada; Shuwari, Kofar Fada; Isore Gabas Primary School; Isore Yamma, Kofar Sarki; Bapparu, Kofar Sarki; Salabari, Kofar Sarki; Kudawa, Kofar Sarki; Kagadama, Kofar Sarki |
| Shira | Sambuwal | Sambuwal Gabas, Primary School; Sambuwal Yamma, Kofar Fada; Kafin Gara, Kofar Fada; Kafin Sule, Kofar Sarki; Kafin Gabas, Kofar Sarki; Kafinkyara, Kofar Sarki; Billitti, Kofar Sarki; Diribo, Kofar Sarki; Jannema, Kofar Sarki; Gidan Jikan Also, Kofar Jikan Also; Kamaku, Primary School; Katabarwa, Kofar Sarki- I; Katabarwa, Kofar Sarki - II; Yakasai, Kofar Sarki; Garin Magaji, Kofar Sarki Garin Magaji |
| Shira | Bukul/Bangire | Bukul Fada A Kofar Fada; Bukul Gabas, Kofar Fada; Bukul Ung. M. Zuberu, Kofar M. Zuberu; Bukul Ung. Rimin, Kofar Alhaji Yaya I; Bukul Ung. Rimin, Kofar Alhaji Yaya II; Bukul Ung. Kurna, Kofar M. Sani; Balijam, Primary School; Malaji, Kofar Sarki; Gotel, Kofar Sarki; Guduma, Kofar Sarki; Balijam Gabas, Kofar Sarki; Dangolu, Kofar Sarki; Shabewa, Kofar Sarki; Gallamari, Kofar Sarki; Bangire, Primary School I; Bangire, Primary School II; Jahin, Kofar Sarki; Bangire Yamma, Kofar Sarki; Bangire Ung. Nagogo, Kofar Nagogo I; Bangire Ung. Nagogo, Kofar Nagogo II; Gaza Gabas, Primary School; Gaza Kudu, Kofar Magaji Dan Yayari; Dago Dutse, Kofar Sarki; Dago Dutse, Primary School; Huli, Kofar Sarki; Kaigama, Kofar Sarki; Languran, Kofar Sarki; Yalwa Kofar Sarki; Yayari Kofar Sarki; Tarawon Bangire, Kofar Sarkin Tarawo; Ganuwa, Kofar Sarki |
| Shira | Disina | Disina Ung. Damamisau, District Head Office; Unguwar Musa, Bakin Tasha; Disina Ung. Yunusa, Kofar Mai Unguwa; Disina Tsangaya, Tsangaya; Disina Yamma, O. P. H.; Disina Gabas Primary School I; Disina Kudu, Kofar Abdulhamid I; Disina Kudu, Kofar Abdulhamid II; Guma, Kofar Sarki; Bidis, Kofar Sarki; Alkaleri, Kofar Sarki-I; Alkaleri, Kofar Sarki -II; Kawandi, Kofar Jauro; G. Tsangaya, Tsangaya; G. Kamati, Primary School; Bakatuma, Kofar Fada; Adamami, Kofar Fada; Adamami Gabas, Kofar Fada; Adamami Yamma, Primary School; Sawi Yamma, Kofar Fada; Sawi Arewa, Primary School; Abisa, Kofar Sarki; Adaha, Kofar Sarki |
| Shira | Faggo | Faggo Yamma, Kofar Fada; Faggo Gabas, Primary School; Faggo Tsangaya, Near Police Station; Ung. Yamma, Kofar Mandaye; Ung. Kudu, Kofar Hallai; Ung. Arewa, Kofar Hallai; Nahuche, Primary School; Faggo Tsakiya, Ung. Kurna I; Faggo Tsakiya, Ung. Kurna II; Bakin Kasuwa, Kofar Mai Salati; Bakin Kasuwa, Kofar Mahauta; Lafiya, Kofar Sarkin Lafiya; Ung. Sati, Kofar Alhaji Adamu; Zigau Gabas, Primary School; Zigau Yamma, Kofar Sarki; Zigau Tasha Dispensary; Ajangagar Primary School; Gudu Primary School; Jatam Kunda, Kofar Sarki; Zamaga Kofar Jauro; Auyakari Kofar Sarkin Auyakari |
| Shira | Beli/Gagidaba | Beli Arewa, Kofar Fada I; Beli Arewa, Kofar Fada II; Beli Yamma, Bakin Kasuwa; Beli Tsangaya, Primary School; Beli Kudu Dispensary; Mangal Kofar Sarki; Kafin Dila Kofar Sarki; Jalkatari Gabas Primary School; Jalkatari Tsakiya, Kofar Sarki; Malori Kofar Sarki; Belin Shirawa, Kofar Sarki; Shatari Kofar Sarki; Nasarawa Kofar Sarki; Saburaji Kofar Sarki; Gagidiba Gabas, Kofar Sarki; Gagidiba Kudu Primary School; Bono Primary School; Tuffori/Yakori, Kofar Sarkin Tuffori; Ganuwa Tsakiya Primary School; Gumel Kofar Sarki; Abarbawo Kofar Sarki; Ganuwa Kofar Sarki |
| Shira | Kilbori | Kilbori Gabas Primary School; Kilbori Yamma Kofar Mai Yauri; Kilbori Yamma Kofar Sarki; Bangayaza, Kofar Sarki; Dalli Gabas Kofar Sarkin Dalli; Dalli Kudu Primary School; Kare Kofar Sarkin Kare; Ganawa Kofar Sarkin Ganawa; Bangala Kofar Sarki; Jama'A Primary School Jama'A; Jambure Kofar Sarki; Lambusa Kofar Sarki; Kargo Kofar Sarki; Kakkaki Primary School; Ribawo Kofar Sarki; Shagogo Kofar Sarki; Kahin, Kofar Sarki-I; Kahin, Kofar Sarki-II |
| Shira | Shira | Shira Kofar Fada Kofar Sarki; Shira Tsamiyari Dispensary; Ung. Gabas Shira, Kofar Mai Unguwa; Ung. Gabas Shira, Gidin Tanki; Ung. Hadejawa, Dev. Area Office I; Ung. Hadejawa, Dev. Area Office II; Ung. Sabo Kofar Jauro; Gwadan - Gwadan Kofar Mai Unguwa; Eldewo Yamma Primary School; Eldewo Gabas Kofar Sarki; Gasa/Katsira, Kofar Sarki; Yalwa Kofar Sarki; Ka'Elwo Kofar Sarki; Fandi Kofar Sarki; Yarka Primary School; Dagauda Kofar Sarkin Jan Dutse; Masukwani Kofar Sarki; Illiyari Kofar Sarki; Garin Maina Uku Kofar Jauro; Dango Fada Kofar Sarki; Dango Yamma O. P. H.; Dango Kudu Primary School; Dangolu Kofar Sarki; Tsumba Kofar Sarki; Kungo Kofar Sarki; Kungo Yamma Kofar Sarki; Gubda Kofar Sarki; Rimi Primary School; Languran Kofar Sarki; Alhajeri Kofar Sarki; Yana Arewa Kofar Malanta; Yana Yamma Kofar Baba Mai Doya; Yana Tsakiya Kofar Babayo; Yana Gabas, Maternity I; Yana Gabas, Maternity II; Kofar Mahauta Viewing Centre; Yanakudu Primary School; Yana Ung. Adamu Health Centre; Yana Ung. Barka Kofar M. Barka; Bage Arewa Kofar Sarki; Bage Kudu Primary School |
| Shira | Tsafi | Tsafi, Kofar Sarki- I; Tsafi, Kofar Sarki - II; Tsafi Ung. Abdu Bako Kofar Maiunguwa Abdu; Tsafi Ung. Bello, Kofar Maiunguwa Abdu; Tsafi Tsangaya, Tsangaya Tasha; Tsafi Tasha, Primary School; Ligada Makera, Kofar Sarki - I; Ligada Malori, Kofar Sarki- II; Balkakori, Primary School; Zainabari, Primary School; Tarawo, Kofar Sarki; Lambu, Dutsawa Kofar Sarki; Gasga, Kofar Sarki; Gurlel, Kofar Sarki; Tungwal, Primary School; Jaka Kudu, Kofar Sarki; Jaka Arewa, Kofar Sarki; Ba'Antum, Kofar Sarki; Nasarawa, Primary School |
| Shira | Tumfafi | Tumfafi Gabas, Kofar Sarki; Tumfafi Kudu, Dispensary; Tumfafi Yamma, Primary School; Dogon Marke, Kofar Sarki; Gaza, Primary School; Chakwati, Kofar Sarkin Chakwati; Katangari, Kofar Sarki; Gaburgu, Primary School; Ganjuyo, Kofar Sarki; Sorodo Gabas, Kofar Sarki; Sorodo Kudu, Primary School; Gwadal, Primary School; Biccilligi, Kofar Sarki; Tarum, Kofar Sarki; Farin Dutse, Kofar Sarki |
| Shira | Zubo | Zubo Yamma, Kofar Sarki - I; Zubo Yamma, Kofar Sarki - II; Darajiya Kudu, Kofar Sarki; Darajiya Arewa, Primary School; Shigau, Kofar Sarkin Shigau; Madobi, Kofar Sarki; Kwanjin, Kofar Sarki; Majiya, Kofar Sarki; Gaduna, Kofar Sarki; Dobi Hardori, Kofar Sarkin Dobi; Daramushe, Primary School; Ibbawo, Kofar Sarkin Ibbawo; Darajiyawo, Primary School; Dobi Shigau, Kofar Sarki; Fawarin Darajiyawa, Kofar Sarkin Darajiya; Zubo Gabas, Primary School |
| Tafawa Balewa | Kardam A' | S/Kudu / G/ Zango, Kofar Sarki; Unguwar Sarkin Yamma, Kofar Sarki; Unguwar Sarkin Yaki, Kofar Sarki; Yalwan Kardam, Kofar Sarki; Unguwar Galadima, Kofar Sarki; Unguwar Wakili, Kofar Sarki; S. Badas /K/ Dutse; K/ Kausawa/K/Billa; K/Gangare/Kwabti; Yalwan Kundum; Sorni; Kundum Muda; Zari Babba/B. Zari; Bamshi, Kofar Sarki; Kwabti Rimi, Primary School; D/Jarawa/Duru, Kofar Sarki; Bariki/S/Yalwan, Primary School |
| Tafawa Balewa | Kardam B' | S/Kudu / G/ Zango, Kofar Sarki; Unguwar Sarkin Yamma, Kofar Sarki; Unguwar Sarkin Yaki, Kofar Sarki; Yalwan Kardam, Kofar Sarki; Unguwar Galadima, Kofar Sarki; Unguwar Wakili, Kofar Sarki; S. Badas /K/ Dutse; K/ Kausawa/K/Billa; K/Gangare/Kwabti; Yalwan Kundum; Sorni; Kundum Muda; Zari Babba/B. Zari; Bamshi, Kofar Sarki; Kwabti Rimi, Primary School; D/Jarawa/Duru, Kofar Sarki; Bariki/S/Yalwan, Primary School |
| Tafawa Balewa | Lere North | Fadan Lere, Area Court; Fadan Malima, Malima Primary School I; Fadan Malima, Malima Primary School II; Munsayi, Munsayi Primary School; Malakri, Kofar Sarki; Sabon Gari, Kofar Sarki; Unguwar Wakili, Dispensary; Zuya Makaranta, Zuya Primary School I; Zuya Makaranta, Zuya Primary School II; Ragami, Ragami Primary School; Kufai/Jigi, Kufai Primary School I; Kufai/Jigi, Kufai Primary School II; Siddin Shehu, Kofar Jauro; Bulli, Bulli Primary School |
| Tafawa Balewa | Lere South | Martin Giji/Daji, Martin Primary School I; Martin Giji/Daji, Martin Primary School II; Martin B. Kogi, Martin B. Kogi Primary School; Tarjang, Kofar Sarki; Sarkin Hausawasara, Sara Primary School; Fadan Kubi, Kubi Primary School; Num Lere/Lwong, Lwong Primary School; Hardon Badam, Badam Primary School |
| Tafawa Balewa | Tapshin | Fadan Tabshin/J/Got, Kofar Sarki -I; Fadan Tabshin/J/Got, Kofar Sarki -II; Fadan J/Bontong, Jirko Primary School; Kwasa / Luggere, Kofar Sarki- I; Kwasa / Luggere, Kofar Sarki - II; Kori /Duwa, Kori Primary School; Duklin Bauchi, Duklin Bauchi Primary School I; Duklin Bauchi, Duklin Bauchi Primary School II; Madamshi /Ung. Dutse, Madamshi Primary School; Dashem B. Kogi, Madamshi Primary School; Powai, Powai; Zindir / Yanji, Gambar Primary School; Fadan Bijim / Ladar, Bijim Kasuwa |
| Tafawa Balewa | Wai | Unguwar Chiroma, Kofar Jauro; Badel, Girgamu Primary School; Unguwar Hardo, Gori Primary School; Yalwa Bagas, Kofar Jauro; Burgel / Bagas, Burgel Primary School; Unguwar Madaki, Kofar Sarki; Zwall Makaranta, Zwall Primary School; Zwall S/Yamma I, Kofar Jauro; Zwall S/Yamma II, Kofar Jauro; Yola Bappate, Yola Primary School; Kutaru / Bashi, Kutaru Primary School; Gumel / Shafau, Gumel Primary School; Wasasa / Mingil, Wasasa Primary; Tafara Kudu, Tafara Primary School; Mbwar, Mbwar Primary School; Zango, Zango Primary School; Goshe /T/Yamma, Goshe Primary School; Waptang / Gadanki, Waptang Primary School; Lim / Tsakani / Bisa, Lim Primary School; Lim Kasa, Kofar Sarki; Gongo, Gongo Primary School; Rugan Tafare, Kofar Jauro; Tafawa Balewa Fada I, District Head Office; Tafew-Balewa Fada II; Tafew-Balewa Fada III; Tafawa Balewa Gabas I, C. P. S.; Tafawa Balewa Gabas II, C. P. S.; Tafewa-Balewa Gabas III Central Primary School; Tafawa Balewa Yamma, Social Welfare I; Tafawa Balewa Yamma, Social Welfare II; Dunga Fada, Dunga Primary School; Dunga Makaranta, Dunga Primary School; Maryam Kudu I, V. T. C. T/Balewa I; Maryam Kudu I, V. T. C. T/Balewa II |
| Tafawa Balewa | Ball | Ball I, Ball Primary School; Ball II, Ball Primary School; Ball III, Ball Primary School; Bambaki, Kofar Sarki; Kayarda, Kofar Sarki; Burwat, Burwat Primary School; Badas, Badas Primary School; Jalingo, Kofar Sarki; Sabon Gida, Sabon Gida Primary School; Wuro Bogga, Kofar Sarki; Sakare I, Kofar Sarki; Sakare II, Kofar Sarki; Kungas, Kofar Sarki; B/Mai Gyada, Kofar Sarki; Wuro Geje, Kofar Sarki; Yola Nora I, Yola Nora Primary School; Yola Nora II, Yola Nora Primary School |
| Tafawa Balewa | Bula | Jambil, Jambil Primary School; Tenam, Kofar Sarki; Latangal, Kofar Sarki; Talkwashak, Kofar Sarki; Wuro Jaban, Kofar Sarki; Gital I, Gital Primary School; Gital II, Gital Primary School; Gital III, Gital Primary School; Yamgan, Yamgan Primary School; Yalwan Sayawa, Primary School; Pekman, Kofar Sarki; Shall, Shall Primary School; Fulanin Kabba, Shall Dispensary; Bundot, Kofar Sarki; Bula, Bula Dispensary |
| Tafawa Balewa | Dajin | Dajin I, Dajin Primary School; Dajin II, Dajin Primary School; Gaso / G/ Kaba, Kofar Sarki; Lir, Kofar Sarki; Lar, Kofar Sarki; Jaban, Jaban Primary School; Kumbus, Kofar Sarki; Katsinawa I, Katsinawa Primary School; Katsinawa II, Katsinawa Dispensary; Mararraba / Jahun / Luru, Kofar Sarki; Polchi, Kofar Sarki |
| Tafawa Balewa | Dull | Wuro Mayo / Badara I, Kofar Sarki; Wuro Mayo / Badara II, Kofar Sarki; Sarkin Yamma, Kofar Sarki; Gidgid Hamma, Primary School; Mbat Daya, Kofar Sarki; Dull Ung. I, Primary School; Dull Ung. II, Primary School; Badakoshi, Kofar Sarki; Kantana, Kofar Sarki; Mbalanbula, Primary School; Mbat Biyu, Primary School; Mbutbin, Primary School; Gwammadaji I, Primary School; Gwammadaji II, Primary School; Wurno I, Primary School; Wurno II, Primary School; Gwaljarenji, Primary School; Gwardin, Primary School; Unguwar Galadima, Primary School; Burga / Gashiya I, Primary School; Burga / Gashiya II, Primary School |
| Tafawa Balewa | Bununu | Makama I, Primary School; Makama II, Primary School; Danmadami, Kofar Sarki- I; Danmadami, Kofar Sarki- II; Bodi, Bodi Primary School; Maciyar Kuka, Kofar Sarki; Bar / Kunsal, Primary School; Kunbukdi, Kofar Sarki; Mailere, Primary School; Gongun, Primary School; G. S. S., Bununu G. S. S.; Duguriyel, Primary School; Unguwar Wambai Bar, Primary School; Bogga, Kofar Sarki; Durum, Primary School; Lir / T/Fulani, Primary School; Nasarawa, Primary School; Bamja / Bamot, Primary School; Barsop, Kofar Sarki; Bagadan, Kofar Sarki; Gekil, Primary School; Garam, Primary School; Dolam, Primary School; Dolam, Kofar Sarki; Unguwar Magaji I, Primary School; Unguwar Magaji II, Primary School; Gwallarai I, Primary School; Kahel, Kofar Sarki; Disin Bula, Kofar Sarki; Gimful, Kofar Sarki; Yisan, Kofar Sarki; Gryalan, Kofar Sarki |
| Toro | Toro / Tulai | Toro Gari, Village Head Office Toro; Mallawa I Gyamzo Primary School; Mallawa II Gyamzo Primary School; Kofar Katuka, District Head Office; Mallawa III Court; Tila I, Toro Maternity Centre; Tila II, Unguwar Madaki, Dispensary; Kayauri/Salla, Primary School; Machido Pry. Sch. (Machido); Miya Barkate Pri. Sch.; Tudun Wada Pri. Sch.; Loro, Primary School; Mallawa IV Primary School; Magama Gumau Fada I, Kofar Sarki; Magama Gumau Fada II, Kofar Sarki; Magama Gumau, Hausawa I; Magama Gumau, Hausawa II; Kurfai, Kofar Sarki; Magama Gari, Primary School; Kwagga, Kofar Sarki; Dangore, Kofar Sarki; Rinjin Mukur, Kofar Sarki; Jambil, Kofar Sarki; Gwaljodu Kofar Sarki; Polchi Kanawa West Primary School; Polchi Kanawa, Kofar Sarki - I; Polchi Kanawa, Kofar Sarki - II; Balarabe Kofar Sarki; Bukka I, Kofar Sarki; Bukka II, Kofar Sarki; Unguware I, Kofar Sarki; Unguware II, Kofar Sarki; Tulai Fada, Primary School; Kwacciyel North I Primary School; Kwacciyel North II Primary School; Sabon Garin Kwacciyel, Kofar Sarki; Polchin Habe, Kofar Sarki, Yakannaji; Tukurkuje, Primary School; Yelwan Gari, Kofar Sarki |
| Toro | Tilden Fulani | Tilde North Primary School; Tilde Ung. North Primary School; Tilde Fada, Kofar Sarki; Ung. Rimi I, Kofar Mai Unguwa; Ung. Rimi II, Kofar Mai Unguwa; Tila Bali, Kofar Sarki; Ung. Tafida, Kofar Mai Unguwa; Ung. Idi, Kofar Madaki; Jimpi I, Kofar Mai Unguwa; Jimpi II, Kofar Mai Unguwa; Narabi Kofar Mai Unguwa; Danbingi Kofar Gwaram; Sabon Garin Narabi, Motor Park; Bujiyel Kasa, Primary School; Bujiyel Sama, Kofar Sarki; Darbuji, Kofar Sarki; Tumu, Primary School; Yolan, Kofar Mai Unguwa; Diriko, Kofar Sarki; Shakuwari, Kofar Sarki; Tilal Fulani, Kofar Sarki; Jeran Bauchi, Kofar Sarki; Tsakuwa Bauchi, Kofar Sarki; Gafanshu Bauchi, Kofar Sarki |
| Toro | Ribina | Ribina I, Kofar Sarki; Ribina II, Kofar Sarki; Zigau, Kofar Sarki; Rawa, Kofar Sarki; Jajuwal Fulani, Primary School; Jajuwal Hausawa, Kofar Sarki; Gwalfada North Kofar Sarki; Kogin Sallah North, Kofar Sarki; Dalam Sallah North, Kofar Sarki; Y/ Dallaji, Primary School I; Y/ Alhaji, Primary School II; Tudun Wada, Ribina Primary School; Matari, Matari Primary School; Doya, Kofar Sarki; Rinji Gani East, Kofar Sarki; Rinji Gani West I, Primary School; Rinji Gani West II, Primary School; Rinji Gani West III, Primary School; Salama, Primary School; Danbako I, Primary School; Danbako II, Primary School; Bargan Fulani, Kofar Sarki; Bargan Kanawa, Kofar Sarki; Gwaskayi Kanawa, Kofar Sarki |
| Toro | Mara / Palama | Palama, Primary School; Lauka, Kofar Sarki; Kufai, Primary School; Zingiri, Primary School; Gwal, Kofar Sarki; Zarimaku, Primary School; Gandi Maje I, Primary School; Gandi Maje II, Primary School; Zakshi I, Primary School; Zakshi II, Primary School; Zari Kwai, Kofar Sarki; Sabon Garin Jarawa, Kofar Sarki; Doka Sari, Kofar Sarki; Gurdun Baka, Kofar Sarki; Yelwa Dawani, Kofar Sarki; Rimin Zayam I, Primary School; Rimin Zayam II, Primary School; Rimin Zayam III, Primary School; Rimin Zayam IV, Primary School; Sutumi I, Kofar Sarki; Sutumi II, Kofar Sarki; Gingin, Kofar Sarki; Taka Bundu, Primary School; Mara, Kofar Sarki; Kahana, Kofar Sarki; Lara, Kofar Sarki; Dolen Gyam, Kofar Sarki; R/Gingir Gora, Kofar Sarki |
| Toro | Rauta / Geji | Rauta I, Primary School; Rauta II, Primary School; Natsira, Kofar Sarki; Bakin Ruwa, Kofar Sarki; Nahuta, Primary School; Nahuta East, Primary School; Runtu I, Kofar Sarki; Runtu II, Kofar Sarki; Marni, Kofar Sarki; Baka/Duguru, Kofar Sarki; Gurdun, Kofar Sarki; G/Tsakani I, Geji Primary School; G/Tsakani II, Geji Primary School; Yolan, Kofar Sarki; Biciki, Kofar Sarki; Fulun Abbai, Dispensary; Chalin Kanawa, Kofar Sarki; Felun Habe, Kofar Sarki; Chalin Cere, Kofar Sarki; R/Gande, G/Yelwa Kofar Sarki; Rugan Hauga, Kofar Sarki; Unguwa Chiroma, Kofar Sarki |
| Toro | Jama'A / Zaranda | Zaranda West I, Primary School; Zaranda West II, Primary School; Zaranda West III, Kofar Sarki; Zaranda West IV, Kofar Sarki; G/Habe I, Kofar Sarki; G/Habe II, Kofar Sarki; Tankandan Giwa I, Primary School; Tankandan Giwa II, Primary School; Waba Fulani, Kofar Sarki; Makeri Sari, Kofar Sarki; Mundu, Kofar Sarki; Dulumin Fulani, Kofar Sarki; Euga Fulani, Kofar Sarki; Dalam Fulani, Kofar Sarki; Dulumin Habe, Kofar Sarki; Zaranda, Kofar Sarki; K/Baundu Baba, Primary School; Sum, Kofar Sarki; Tafawa, Kofar Sarki; Balla, Kofar Sarki; Bolu, Kofar Sarki; T / Kanawa, Kofar Sarki; Nabordo North I, Viewing Centre; Nabordo North II, Viewing Centre; Nabordo North III, Viewing Centre; Nabordo South, Primary School; Ita / S. Gari, Kofar Sarki; Jauro, Kofar Sarki; Takabundu Macca, Kofar Sarki; Dori, Kofar Sarki; Unguwa Baraya, Primary School; Nabordo, Viewing Centre; Wom / Kanawa I, Viewing Centre; Wom / Kanawa II, Viewing Centre; Jama'A / S. Gari, Viewing Centre; Girsilli, Kofar Sarki; Rinjin Tatu, Kofar Sarki; Gaigam, Kofar Sarki; Jimeri, Kofar Sarki; Galda Kofar Sarki; Zull Pry. Sch. |
| Toro | Lame | Lame I, Primary School; Lame II, Primary School; Lame III, Primary School; Galmande, Kofar Sarki; Gukka, Primary School; Gwalbanya, Kofar Sarki; Gwalbanya, Primary School; Dabo, Kofar Sarki; Basuka, Kofar Sarki; Sagare, Kofar Sarki; Shau, Kofar Sarki; Bangole, Kofar Sarki; Joji, Kofar Sarki; Ruhu, Primary School; Unguwa Ta, Kofar Sarki; Barandau / Baynaga I, Primary School; Barandau / Baynaga II, Primary School |
| Toro | Wonu | Unguwa Waziri I, Primary School; Unguwa Waziri II, Primary School; Kofar Fada I, District Head Office; Kofar Fada II, District Head Office; Gumau, Kofar Maiunguwa; R/Dalam, Primary School; Shenu, Primary School; S/Ririwai, Kofar M/Unguwa; Sanga, Kofar M/Unguwa; Unguwa Sako, Kofar M/Unguwa; Gumau West II, Kofar Sarki; Gumau West III, Kofar Sarki; Wonu, Kofar Sarki; Dawarde Nabaka, Primary School; Unguwa Yanga, Kofar Sarki; Katataje, Kofar Sarki; Badiko I, Primary School; Badiko II, Primary School; Kochoho, Unguwa Babujayi; Unguwa Malam Ya'U, Kofar Sarki; Unguwar M. Isa, Kofar Sarki; Buri, Kofar Sarki; Managari, Kofar Sarki; Pingel, Primary School; Unguwa Kadiri, Kofar Mai Unguwa; Lunlungol, Kofar Mai Unguwa |
| Toro | Zalau / Rishi | Zalau I, Primary School; Zalau II, Primary School; Dawa, Kofar Sarki; Galarde, Kofar Sarki; Babban Gura, Kofar Sarki; Riga Gura, Kofar Sarki; Arewa Rinji I, Primary School; Arewa Rinji II, Primary School; Unguwa Galadima, Kofar Sarki; Chediya, Kofar Sarki; Motto, Motor Park; Jawando, Kofar Sarki; Chako, Kofar Sarki; Rishi I, Primary School; Rishi II, Primary School; Rishi Kasuwa, Bakin Kasuwa; Zingiri, Kofar Sarki; Gurbin Kawu I, Kofar Sarki; Dababe I, Primary School; Dababe II, Primary School; Zagawa, Kofar Sarki; Sunkulkye, Kofar Sarki; Nahuta, Kofar Sarki; Karara, Kofar Sarki; Bishiwai, Kofar Sarki; Gurbin Kawu II, Kofar Sarki; Zukku, Primary School |
| Toro | Tama | Bongon Tama, Primary School; Lau Unguwa Arewa I, Primary School; Lau Unguwa Arewa II, Primary School; Bakarfa, Kofar Sarki; Kuri, Kofar Sarki; Nasarawa Rinji Nomadic Pri, Sch-Vp; Tulu South I, Primary School; Tulu South II, Primary School; Tulu North, Dispensary; Tama, District Head Office; D / Taura Baki, Binya Primary School; Taura Babba, Kofar Sarki; Siyayel, Kofar Sarki; Gurungu, Kofar Sarki; Sabon Garin Tulu I, Primary School; Sabon Garin Tulu II, Primary School; Shibi, Kofar Sarki; Zuna I, Kofar Sarki; Zuna II, Kofar Sarki; Tarkunya Beri, Kofar Sarki; Kuru I, Kofar Sarki; Unguwa Magaji, Kofar Sarki; B /Mai Lamba, Kofar Sarki |
| Toro | Rahama | Rahama, Rahama Primary School; Kere I, Kere Primary School; Kere II, Kere II Primary School; Unguwar S/Noma, Kofar Sarkin Noma; Makana, Makana Primary School; Matawai, Matawai Primary School; Ashura, Kofar Mai Unguwa; Unguwar J. Kurama, Kofar Mai Unguwa; Unguwar Maccido, Kofar Mai Unguwa; Samanja I, Samanja Primary School; Samanja II, Samanja Primary School; Unguwar J. Mas’Ud, Kofar Sarki; Zirya I, Kofar Sarki; Zirya II, Kofar Sarki; G/Ung. Gari I, Kofar Sarki; Doma Gari I, Kofar Sarki; Doma Gari II, Kofar Sarki; Unguwar Malam Saidu, Kofar Saidu; Unguwar Sarkin Fawa, Kofar S. Fawa |
| Warji | Baima North / West | Kadale B, Kofar Mai Unguwa; Gawo, Kofar Mai Anguwa; M/Badunwa, Masaki Primary School; B/Bulgana Dispensary; Dugunniya, Primary School; Baima Tsamiya, Baima Primary School; Muda Babba, Muda Primary School I; Muda Babba, Muda Primary School II; Muda Dallan Primary School; Kuyaba, Kofar Mai Unguwa; Gawo, Kofar Hamidu |
| Warji | Baima South/East | Unguwar Dogo, Kofar Mai Unguwa; Laba, Laba Primary School I; Laba, Primary School II; Shatako, Kofar Mai Unguwa; Hardo Jalo, Kofar Gardo Jalo; Unguwar Hakilu, Kofar Mai Unguwa; K/H/H. Jaji, Kofar Mai Unguwa; Unguwar Auta, Kofar Mai Unguwa; D/Dagiru, Kofar Mai Unguwa; Gasina, Kofar Mai Unguwa; Hardo Hassan, Kofar Mallam Hassan; Barkwai, Kofar Mai Unguwa I; Barkwai, Kofar Mai Unguwa II |
| Warji | Dagu East | G/Kanmasaya, Kandasaya Primary School; Gadama, Gadama Primary School; Dagun Dutse, Kofar Mai Unguwa; G/Kagadama, Kagadama Primary School; Sosaye, Kofar Mai Unguwa; Badeyeso I, Kofar Sarki; Burga, Burga Primary School; Badeyeso II, Kofar Sarki; Sosaye II Kofar Alhaji Amadu Tsoho |
| Warji | Dagu West | Baki (Disa), Disa Primary School; Haya, Kofar Mai Unguwa; Ganji, Ganji Primary School; Wando, Kofar Mai Unguwa I; Wando, Kofar Mai Unguwa II; Baure, Kofar Mai Unguwa; Disa Kofar Sarki, Kofar Sarki; Ganji, Kofar Mai Unguwa |
| Warji | Gabanga | Gabanga, Kofar Sarki - I; Gabanga, Kofar Sarki -II; Kwandasha, Kofar Mai A`Nguwa; B/B/B. G Kuka, Kofar Mai A`Nguwa; Lirna'A, Lirna'A Primary School; Lungwai, Kofar Mai Unguwa; H/Isah Wurwa, Kofar H. Isah; H/G/H. Hassan, Kofar Hardo Gajan; Kofar Kanawa I, Kofar Kanawa Primary School; Kofar Kanawa II, Kofar Kanawa Primary School; Kofar Kanawa III, Kofar Kanawa Dispensary; Kofar Kanawa IV, Kofar Kanawa Dispensary; Buran Kwari, Kofar Mallam Haji - I; Buran Kwari, Kofar Mallam Haji II |
| Warji | Katanga | Koriya, Kofar Mai Unguwa Koriya; Katanga I, District Head Office; Katanga II, District Head Office; Katanga III, District Head Office; Danina, Tuya Primary School; Lafiya, Kofar Mai Unguwa; Jagwadin, Kofar Mai Unguwa; Tudun Alheri, Tudun Alheri Primary School |
| Warji | Ranga | Dansai, Kofar Sarkin Ranga; Tuya, Tuya Primary School; Gabanya, Kofar Mai Unguwa; Burarana, Kofar Mai Unguwa; Lasau, Kofar Mai Unguwa; Jawa, Kofar Mai Unguwa; G/Ringa Rumba, Kofar Mai Unguwa; Kwamai, Kofar Mai Unguwa; Dunburna, Kofar Mai Unguwa |
| Warji | Tiyin | Tiyin, Primary School I; Tiyin, Primary School II; Kahan, Kofar Mai Unguwa; Kacha, Kofar Hardo; Dawaga, Kofar Mai Dawaga; Hardo Patoma, Bujala Primary School; Bujala, Kofar Mai Unguwa; Aru, Kofar Mai Unguwa I; Aru, Kofar Mai Unguwa II; Danya, Kofar Mai Unguwa; Dangu, Kofar Mai Unguwa; Shitako, Kofar Mai Unguwa; Dawala, Dawala Dispensary; Biza, Kofar Mai Unguwa; Unguwar Isah, Kofar Mai Unguwa; Shitako II, Runba Primary School |
| Warji | Tudun Wada East | Unguwar B. Abdu, Kofar Abdu Disa; Unguwar Indi, Kofar Indi; Hardo Isah, Kofar Mai Unguwa; Kulumi, Kofar Mai Unguwa Kulumi; Dogo, Tsangaya I, Tudun Wada Primary School; Dogo Tsangaya II, Tudun Wada Primary School; Gidan Mada, Kofar Mai Unguwa; Yayari I, Yayari Primary School; Yayari II, Yayari Primary School; Hardo Isah, Nomadic Primary School |
| Warji | Tudun Wada West | Unguwar Makera, Kofar Mai Unguwa; Unguwar Kirgi, Kofar Mai Unguwa; Kadanya, Kofar Mai Unguwa; Hardo Saleh, Kofar Hardo Saleh; Unguwar Yarko I, Kofar Mai Unguwar Yaro; Dallaji I, Dallaji Primary School; Dallaji II, Dallaji Primary School; Dallaji III, Dallaji Primary School; Marasuwa I, Kofar Mai Unguwa; Marasuwa II, Kofar Mai Unguwa; Danbazau, Kofar Mai Unguwa; Sabon Gari, Kofar Mai Unguwa; Hardo Dambo, Kofar Hardo Dambo; Wuha, Kofar Mai Unguwa; Kungoyom, Kofar Mai Unguwa |
| Zaki | Bursali | Bursali Primary School I; Bursali Primary School II; Masaje, N. V. H. H.; Lodiyo, N. V. H. H.; Mazo, N. V. H. H.; Gana, N. V. H. H.; Bagam Primary School; Tikirze, N. V. H. H.; Maimari Primary School; Jundu, N. V. H. H.; Lodiyo Primary School I; Lodiyo Primary School II; Lodiyo Dispensary; Jambori Near Village Head; Kawowa Near Village Head; Takeri Near Village Head; Nabiyel Near Village Head; Damobi Near Village Head; Tigi Near Village Head; Zina, N. V. H. H.; Sabon Gari, N. V. H. H.; Garin Kwauto, N. V. H. H.; Gamdu Near Village Head; Ladari Primary School I; Ladari Primary School II; Gamdu, N. V. H. H.; Bausheri, N. V. H. H.; Jullahi, N. V. H. H.; Mallajerin Near Village Head; Sansan Near Village Head |
| Zaki | Katagum | Unguwar Dan Boza, K. F. G.; Unguwar Yayari, Katagum Primary School; Nguwar Sule Itace Rimindi; Unguwar Sule Gado; Unguwar Abdu Sarallo, K. S. Fawa; Unguwar Nasarawa, Nasarawa I; Unguwar Nasarawa, Nasarawa II; Unguwar Tata Mahauchi, K. B. D.; Old Secretariat, Secretariat; Tarbuwa, Primary School; Galdimari, Primary School; Kujjin Primary School; Daya Gabas Primary School; Dassare Near Village Head; Kujjin Jigawa, Village Head |
| Zaki | Tashena / Gadai | Tashena Primary School. I; Tashena Primary School II; Tashena Primary. School. III; Garin Jauro Saidu, Kofar Jauro; Sansan Primary School I; Sansan Primary School II; Disina, N. V. H. H.; Barnesu Primary School; Garin Gami Primary School; Garin Gami A Near Village Head; Tadire Near Village Head I; Tadire Near Village Head II; Turaru Near Village Head; Amalewa Near Village Head; Adishin Tsoho A Near Village Head; Wareke Near Village Head; Gafuwari Near Village Head; Gadai Near Village Head; Garin Jauro Isa, Garin Jauro Isa; Garin Jauro Ahmadu, N. V. H. H.; Maikore Primary School; Gadai West Primary School; Malumri, Near Village Head I; Malumri, Near Village Head II; Katabji, Near Village Head; Ataguya, Near Village Head; Bulana Gana, Near Village Head; Kirchibuwa Primary School; Asake Primary School; Dudduru, N. V. H. H.; Gasamako, N. V. H. H.; Futti Primary School; Kwayamri, Near Village Head |
| Zaki | Makawa | Makawa Primary School I; Makawa Primary School II; Tasari Near Village Head; Adamate; Alkwamari Near Village Head; Gara Primary School; Suwa, Near Village Head; Tabasu, Near Village Head; Manawaniski, Near Village Head; Barwari Primary School I; Barwari Primary School II; Kadaddu Near Village Head I; Kadaddu Near Village Head II; Gujarma Near Village Head; Agusha Near Village Head; Kabayam Near Village Head |
| Zaki | Sakwa | Sakwa West C. P. S. Sakwa I; Sakwa East C. P. S. Sakwa II; Sakwa East C. P. S. Sakwa III; Unguwar Waziri Kofar M. Daguma I; Unguwar Waziri, Kofar M. Daguma II; Sakwa Central Library I; Sakwa Central Library II; Dandalin J. Daya Dandalin J. Daya; Kofar S. Sakwa Kofar Fada; Kofar Yalwa Kofar Yalwa; Fuchukuwa Primary School; Lariye, Near Village Head; Amarmari Primary School; Badegana Near Village Head; Guzarma Near Village Head; Gabda, Near Village Head; Umari, Near Village Head; Guramfaram, Near Village Head; Dugumani, Near Village Head; Dadauri, Near Village Head; Kameme, Primary School; Jajeri, Primary School; Daushe, Near Village Head; Yola Gotel, Near Village Head; Tijjanai, Near Village Head |
| Zaki | Gumai | Gumai East, Primary School; Kankaleri, N. V. H. H.; Kadirawa, N. V. H. H.; Gumal West, Primary School; Birkimona, Primary School; Bibbidige, Near Village Head; Galyimari, Near Village Head; Tanije, Primary School; Duka, Near Village Head; Bagalu I, Near Village Head; Bagalu I I, Near Village Head; Nomari, Near Village Head; Bagwaram, Near Village Head; Tallo, Near Village Head; Shalaude, Near Village Head; Jautari, Near Village Head; Sabon Dara, Near Village Head; Aishi, Near Village Head |
| Zaki | Murmur North | Murmur, Primary School; Murmur, Kofar Fada; Burkuma, Near Village Head; Amada, Near Village Head; Kachan, Near Village Head; Wasari, Near Village Head; Yalwa, Near Village Head; Madufa East, Primary School; Madufa West, Primary School; Madufa South, Primary School; Malo Near Village Head; Chacharam Near Village Head; Ilalla Near Village Head |
| Zaki | Murmur South | Sandigalu Primary. School. I; Sandigalu Primary. School. II; Mara Near Village Head; Barwari, Near Village Head; Bura, Near Village Head; Jigawa, Near Village Head; Karagi, Near Village Head; Chibiayayi Primary School I; Chibiayayi Primary School II; Dambaja, N. V. H. H.; Chibiyayi Primary School I; Chibiyayi Primary School II; Babbadige, Near Village Head I; Babbadige, Near Village Head II; Gollanlan, Near Village Head; Jolga Near Village Head; Bakari Near Village Head; Marabagumai Near Village Head; Bardusu Near Village Head |
| Zaki | Alangawari / Kafin / Larabawa | Alangawari, Primary School I; Alangawari, Primary School II; Alangawari, Primary School III; Kagumaje, Near Village Head; Buchuligi, Near Village Head; Bakari, Near Village Head; Jadda, Near Village Head; Mammaduri, Near Village Head; Galdamari, Near Village Head; Kafin Larabawa, Kofar Fada; Kafin Larabawa I, Primary School; Kafin Larawa Arewa, S. Fawa; Majari, Near Village Head; Yola, Near Village Head; Kirilla, Near Village Head; Jodanga, Near Village Head; Almajari, Near Village Head; Ragwaram, Near Village Head |
| Zaki | Maiwa | Maiwa, Primary School; Zareku, Near Village Head; Gayambo, Primary School; Sabon Gari, Primary School I; Sabon Gari, Primary School II; Agon, N. V. H. H.; Asurbun, N. V. H. H.; Kiziri, N. V. H. H.; Kaskindim, N. V. H. H.; Kukuwa, N. V. H. H.; Garin Malam, N. V. H. H.; Mallamawan, Primary School; Gurka Gabas, Primary School; Gurka Tsakiya, Tsangaya; Gurka Yamma, Near Village Head; Tubsuga, Near Village Head; Kukawan Kizir, Near Village Head; Kuduban, Near Village Head; Alhajeri, Near Village Head; Garin Jauro Bello, Near Village Head |
| Zaki | Mainako | Mainako, Primary School I; Mainako, Primary School II; Sabakuwa, Primary School I; Sabakuwa, Primary School II; Sarabugum, Primary School; Zango, Near Village Head I; Zango, Near Village Head II; Ariri, Near Village Head I; Ariri, Near Village Head II; Auyakari, Primary School; Kore Mabbi, Primary School; Bajuwa, Primary School; Matara, Near Village Head; Gauya, Near Village Head I; Gauya, Near Village Head II; Gauya, Primary School III; Maikore, Primary School; Tabaki, Near Village Head; Daladagum, Near Village Head; Kagilchamu, Primary School; Arganari, Near Village Head; Kajami, Near Village Head; Bulturi, Near Village Head |
