= Nigerian National Assembly delegation from Bauchi =

Bauchi's delegation in Nigeria's National Assembly

The Nigerian National Assembly delegation from Bauchi comprises three Senators representing Bauchi Central, Bauchi South, Bauchi North and twelve Representatives representing Misau/Dambam, Zaki, Katagum, Bogoro, Gamawa, Jama'are, Bauchi, Darazo/Ganjuma, Ningi/Warji, Alkaleri/Kirfi, Shira/Giade, and Toro.

== Fourth Republic ==
=== The 10th Parliament (2023–2027) ===
Members of the House of Representatives during the Fourth Assembly from Bauchi State
Office	Name	Party	Constituency	Term
Senator	Umar Shehu Buba	APC	Bauchi South	2023–2027
Senator	Abdul Ningi	PDP	Bauchi Central	2023–2027
Senator	Samaila Dahuwa Kaila	APC	Bauchi North	2023–2027
Office	Member's Name	Party	Constituency	Term
Representative	Aliyu Bappa Misau	PDP	Misau/Dambam	2023–2027
Representative	Muhammed Dan Abba Shehu	PDP	Zaki	2023–2027
Representative	Auwalu Abdu Gwalabe	PDP	Katagum	2023–2027
Representative	Leko Jafaru Gambo	APC	Bogoro/Dass/Tafawa Balewa	2023–2027
Representative	Adamu Ibrahim Gamawa	APC	Gamawa	2023–2027
Representative	Rabilu Bala	APC	Jama'are/Itas-Gadau	2023–2027
Representative	Aliyu Aminu Garu	PDP	Bauchi	2023–2027
Representative	Mansur Manu Soro	APC	Darazo/Gunjuwa	2023–2027
Representative	Hashimu Adamu	PDP	Ningi/Warji	2023–2027
Representative	Kabiru Yusuf Alhaji	APC	Alkaleri/Kirfi	2023–2027
Representative	Sani Ibrahim Tanko	PDP	Shira/Giade	2023–2027
Representative	Dabo Ismaila Haruna	APC	Toro	2023–2027

=== The 9th Parliament (2019–2023) ===
Members of the House of Representatives during the Fourth Assembly from Bauchi State
Office	Name	Party	Constituency	Term
Senator	Lawal Yahaya Gumau	APC	Bauchi South	2019–2023
Senator	Halliru Dauda Jika	APC	Bauchi Central	2019–2023
Senator	Adamu Bulkachuwa	APC	Bauchi North	2019–2023
Office	Member's Name	Party	Constituency	Term
Representative	Ibrahim Makama Misau	APC	Misau/Dambam	2019–2023
Representative	Tata Omar	APC	Zaki	2019–2023
Representative	Umar Abdulkadir Sarki	ADC	Katagum	2019–2023
Representative	Yakubu Dogara	PDP	Bogoro/Dass/Tafawa Balewa	2019–2023
Representative	Ahmed Gololo	APC	Gamawa	2019–2023
Representative	Bashir Uba Mashema	APC	Jama'are/Itas-Gadau	2019–2023
Representative	Yakubu Shehu Abdullahi	APC	Bauchi	2019–2023
Representative	Mansur Manu Soro	APC	Darazo/Gunjuwa	2019–2023
Representative	Abdullahi Saad Abdulkadir	APC	Ningi/Warji	2019–2023
Representative	Musa Mohammed Pali	APC	Alkaleri/Kirfi	2019–2023
Representative	Kani Faggo Abubakar	APC	Shira/Giade	2019–2023
Representative	Umar Muda Lawal	APC	Toro	2019–2023

=== The 8th Parliament (2015–2019) ===
Office	Name	Party	Constituency	Term	
Senator	Malam Wakili	APC	Bauchi South	2015–March 2018	Lawal Yahaya Gumau 2018 – 2019
Senator	Isah Misau	APC	Bauchi Central	2015–2019	
Senator	Suleiman Nazif	APC	Bauchi North	2015–2019	
Representative	Ahmed Yerima	APC	Misan/Dambam	2015–2019	
Representative	Omar Tata	APC	Zaki	2015–2019	
Representative	Ibrahim Mohammad Baba	APC	Katagum	2015–2019	
Representative	Yakubu Dogara ( Nigerian Speaker)	PDP	Bogoro/Dass/Tafawa Balewa	2015–2019	
Representative	Mohammed Garba	APC	Gamawa	2015–2019	
Representative	Isa Hassan Jama'are	APC	Jama'are/Itas-Gadau	2015–2019	
Representative	Shehu Musa	APC	Bauchi	2015–2019	
Representative	Jika Haliru	APC	Darazu/Ganjuma	2015–2019	
Representative	Zakari Salisu	APC	Ningi/Wanji	2015–2019	
Representative	Muhammad Abdu	APC	Alkaleri/Kirfi	2015–2019	
Representative	Adamu Gurai	APC	Shira/Giade	2015–2019	
Representative	Lawal Yahaya Gumau	APC	Toro	2015–2018	Yusuf Nuhu 2018 – 2019

=== The 7th Parliament (2011–2015) ===
Office	Name	Party	Constituency	Term
Senator	Ibrahim Musa	APC	Bauchi South	2011–2015
Senator	Ahmed Ningi	APC	Bauchi Central	2011–2015
Senator	Babayo Garba Gamawa	APC	Bauchi North	2011–2015
Representative	Ahmed Misau	PDP	Misan/Dambam	2011–2015
Representative	Auwal Jatau	ANPP	Zaki	2011–2015
Representative	Saleh Dahiru	APC	Katagum	2011–2015
Representative	Yakubu Dogara	PDP	Bogoro/Dass/Tafawa Balewa	2011–2015
Representative	Ahmed Gololo	CPC	Gamawa	2011–2015
Representative	Isa Hassan Jama'are	ANPP	Jama'are/Itas-Gadau	2011–2015
Representative	Aliyu Ibrahim Gebi	CPC	Bauchi	2011–2015
Representative	Abubakar Tutare	PDP	Darazo/Gunjuwa	2011–2015
Representative	Abdulrazak Nuhu Zaki	PDP	Ningi/Warji	2011–2015
Representative	Abdullahi Adamu	PDP	Alkaleri/Kirfi	2011–2015
Representative	Adamu Gurai	APC	Shira/Giade	2011–2015
Representative	Lawal Yahaya Gumau	APC	Toro	2011–2015
