= 2023 Nigerian presidential election in Bauchi State =

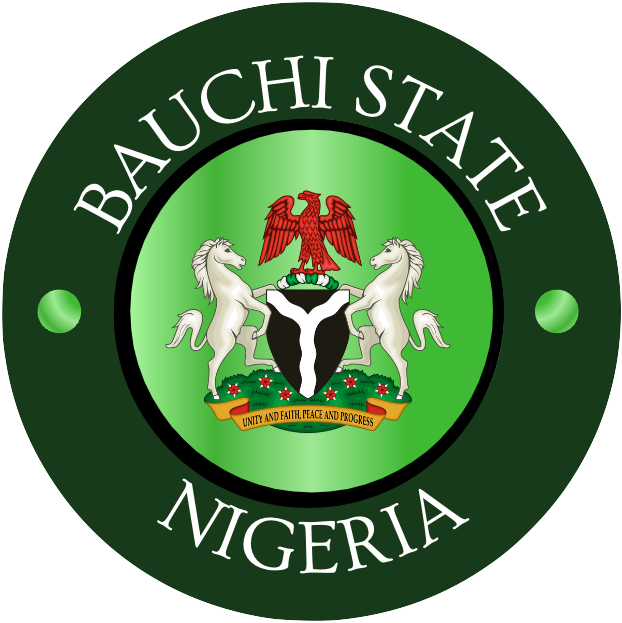
- 25 February 2023
- Registered: 2,749,268
- Turnout: 32.73%
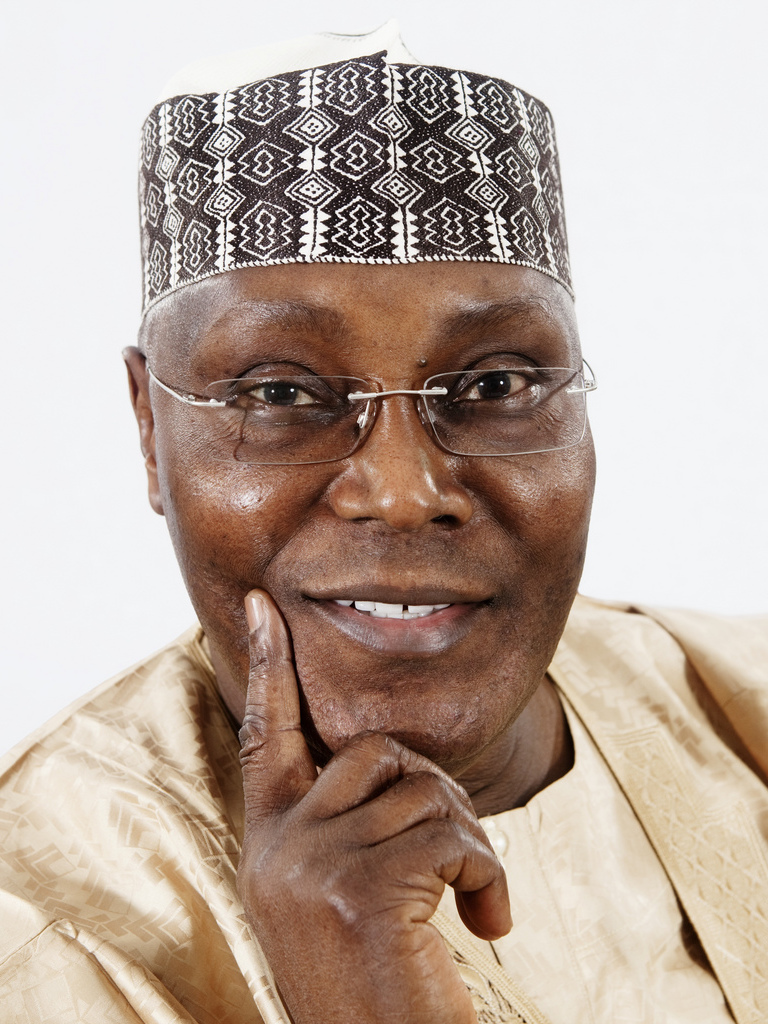

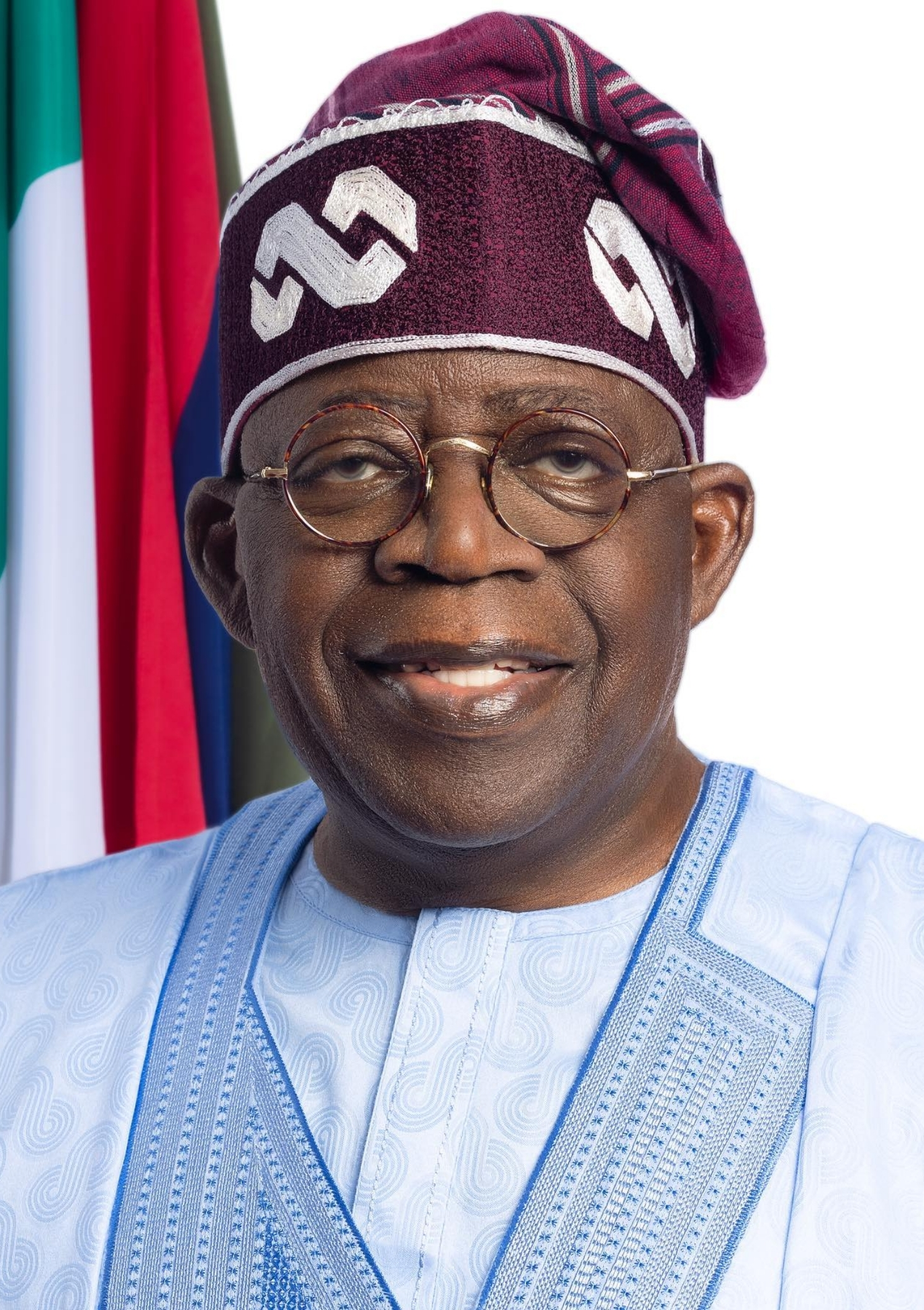

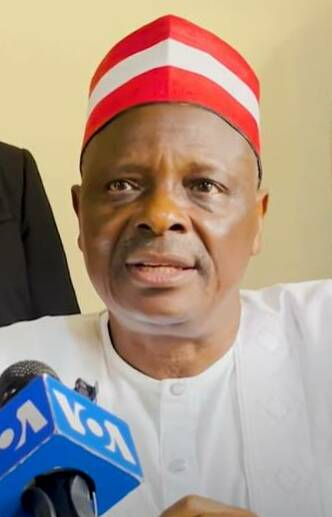
Nominee	Atiku Abubakar	Bola Tinubu	Rabiu Kwankwaso
Party	PDP	APC	NNPP
Home state	Adamawa	Lagos	Kano
Running mate	Ifeanyi Okowa	Kashim Shettima	Isaac Idahosa
Popular vote	426,607	316,694	72,103
Percentage	49.98%	37.10%	8.45%
President before election
Muhammadu Buhari
APC
Elected President
Bola Tinubu
APC

The 2023 Nigerian presidential election in Bauchi State was held on 25 February 2023 as part of the nationwide 2023 Nigerian presidential election to elect the president and vice president of Nigeria. Other federal elections, including elections to the House of Representatives and the Senate, will also be held on the same date while state elections will be held two weeks afterward on 11 March.

== Background ==
Bauchi State is a large, diverse northeastern state with a growing economy and vast natural areas but facing an underdeveloped yet vital agricultural sector, desertification, and a rising sexual violence epidemic. Politically, the state's 2019 elections were a mixed bag for both major parties. In federal elections, Buhari held the state for the APC albeit with a reduced margin of victory while the APC swept all senate seats by winning back two seats it lost due to defections. Both major parties lost seats in House of Representatives elections to the benefit of the minor People's Redemption Party. On the state level, Mohammed unseated APC incumbent Governor Mohammed Abdullahi Abubakar by a narrow margin as the APC held the House of Assembly.

== Polling ==
Polling organisation/client	Fieldwork date	Sample size					Others	Undecided	Undisclosed	Not voting
Polling organisation/client	Fieldwork date	Sample size	Tinubu APC	Obi LP	Kwankwaso NNPP	Abubakar PDP	Others	Undecided	Undisclosed	Not voting
BantuPage	January 2023	N/A	34%	1%	9%	45%	–	9%	2%	0%
Nextier (Bauchi crosstabs of national poll)	27 January 2023	N/A	30.0%	1.0%	4.0%	60.0%	–	5.0%	–	–
SBM Intelligence for EiE (Bauchi crosstabs of national poll)	22 January-6 February 2023	N/A	27%	18%	10%	18%	1%	5%	–	–

== Projections ==
Source	Projection		As of
Africa Elects (Note: Africa Elects projections predict the likelihood of a candidate winning a state by categorizing a state as "Safe" for exceedingly likely, "Likely" for somewhat likely, and "Lean" for least likely. If no clear determination could be made, states are categorized as "tossups".)	Likely Abubakar		24 February 2023
Dataphyte (Note: Dataphyte projections predict candidates' projected votal shares in each state.)
Dataphyte	Tinubu:	19.80%	11 February 2023
Dataphyte	Obi:	8.07%	11 February 2023
Dataphyte	Abubakar:	65.12%	11 February 2023
Dataphyte	Others:	7.00%	11 February 2023
Enough is Enough- SBM Intelligence (Note: EiE-SBM projections predict which candidates will win states.)	Abubakar		17 February 2023
SBM Intelligence (Note: SBM projections predict which candidates will win states or, if no determination could be made, categorizes states as "Too close to call" (TCC).)	Abubakar		15 December 2022
ThisDay (Note: ThisDay projections predict candidates' projected votal shares in each state.)
ThisDay	Tinubu:	20%	27 December 2022
ThisDay	Obi:	5%	27 December 2022
ThisDay	Kwankwaso:	15%	27 December 2022
ThisDay	Abubakar:	40%	27 December 2022
ThisDay	Others/Undecided:	20%	27 December 2022
The Nation (Note: SBM projections predict which candidates will win states or, if no determination could be made, categorizes states as "Battlegrounds.")	Battleground		12-19 February 2023

== General election ==
=== Results ===
Candidate	Running mate	Party	Votes	%
Atiku Abubakar	Ifeanyi Okowa	PDP	426,607	49.98
Bola Tinubu	Kashim Shettima	APC	316,694	37.10
Rabiu Kwankwaso	Isaac Idahosa	NNPP	72,103	8.45
Peter Obi	Yusuf Datti Baba-Ahmed	LP	27,373	3.21
Others candidates	–	Others	10,739	1.26
Total			853,516	100.00
Valid votes			853,516	96.71
Invalid/blank votes			29,030	3.29
Total votes			899,769	–
Registered voters/turnout			2,749,268	32.73

==== By senatorial district ====
The results of the election by senatorial district.

Senatorial district	Bola Tinubu APC		Atiku Abubakar PDP		Peter Obi LP		Rabiu Kwankwaso NNPP		Others		Total valid votes
Senatorial district	Votes	%	Votes	%	Votes	%	Votes	%	Votes	%	Total valid votes
Bauchi Central Senatorial District (Note: Comprising the local government areas of Damban, Darazo, Ganjuwa, Misau, Ningi, and Warji.)	TBD	%	TBD	%	TBD	%	TBD	%	TBD	%	TBD
Bauchi North Senatorial District (Note: Comprising the local government areas of Gamawa, Giade, Itas/Gadau, Jamaare, Katagum, Shira, and Zaki.)	TBD	%	TBD	%	TBD	%	TBD	%	TBD	%	TBD
Bauchi South Senatorial District (Note: Comprising the local government areas of Alkaleri, Bauchi, Bogoro, Dass, Kirfi, Tafawa Balewa, and Toro.)	TBD	%	TBD	%	TBD	%	TBD	%	TBD	%	TBD
Totals	TBD	%	TBD	%	TBD	%	TBD	%	TBD	%	TBD

==== By federal constituency ====
The results of the election by federal constituency.

Federal constituency	Bola Tinubu APC		Atiku Abubakar PDP		Peter Obi LP		Rabiu Kwankwaso NNPP		Others		Total valid votes
Federal constituency	Votes	%	Votes	%	Votes	%	Votes	%	Votes	%	Total valid votes
Alkaleri/Kirfi Federal Constituency (Note: Comprising the local government areas of Alkaleri and Kirfi.)	TBD	%	TBD	%	TBD	%	TBD	%	TBD	%	TBD
Bauchi Federal Constituency (Note: Comprising the local government area of Bauchi.)	TBD	%	TBD	%	TBD	%	TBD	%	TBD	%	TBD
Darazo/Ganjuwa Federal Constituency (Note: Comprising the local government areas of Darazo and Ganjuwa.)	TBD	%	TBD	%	TBD	%	TBD	%	TBD	%	TBD
Dass/Bogoro/Tafawa Balewa Federal Constituency (Note: Comprising the local government areas of Dass, Bogoro, and Tafawa Balewa.)	TBD	%	TBD	%	TBD	%	TBD	%	TBD	%	TBD
Gamawa Federal Constituency (Note: Comprising the local government area of Gamawa.)	TBD	%	TBD	%	TBD	%	TBD	%	TBD	%	TBD
Jama’are/Itas-Gadau Federal Constituency (Note: Comprising the local government areas of Jamaare and Itas/Gadau.)	TBD	%	TBD	%	TBD	%	TBD	%	TBD	%	TBD
Katagum Federal Constituency (Note: Comprising the local government area of Katagum.)	TBD	%	TBD	%	TBD	%	TBD	%	TBD	%	TBD
Misau/Dambam Federal Constituency (Note: Comprising the local government areas of Misau and Dambam.)	TBD	%	TBD	%	TBD	%	TBD	%	TBD	%	TBD
Ningi/Warji Federal Constituency (Note: Comprising the local government areas of Ningi and Warji.)	TBD	%	TBD	%	TBD	%	TBD	%	TBD	%	TBD
Shira/Giade Federal Constituency (Note: Comprising the local government areas of Shira and Giade.)	TBD	%	TBD	%	TBD	%	TBD	%	TBD	%	TBD
Toro Federal Constituency (Note: Comprising the local government area of Toro.)	TBD	%	TBD	%	TBD	%	TBD	%	TBD	%	TBD
Zaki Federal Constituency (Note: Comprising the local government area of Zaki.)	TBD	%	TBD	%	TBD	%	TBD	%	TBD	%	TBD
Totals	TBD	%	TBD	%	TBD	%	TBD	%	TBD	%	TBD

==== By local government area ====
The results of the election by local government area.

Local government area	Bola Tinubu APC		Atiku Abubakar PDP		Peter Obi LP		Rabiu Kwankwaso NNPP		Others		Total valid votes	Turnout (%)
Local government area	Votes	%	Votes	%	Votes	%	Votes	%	Votes	%	Total valid votes	Turnout (%)
Alkaleri	TBD	%	TBD	%	TBD	%	TBD	%	TBD	%	TBD	%
Bauchi	TBD	%	TBD	%	TBD	%	TBD	%	TBD	%	TBD	%
Bogoro	TBD	%	TBD	%	TBD	%	TBD	%	TBD	%	TBD	%
Damban	TBD	%	TBD	%	TBD	%	TBD	%	TBD	%	TBD	%
Darazo	TBD	%	TBD	%	TBD	%	TBD	%	TBD	%	TBD	%
Dass	TBD	%	TBD	%	TBD	%	TBD	%	TBD	%	TBD	%
Gamawa	TBD	%	TBD	%	TBD	%	TBD	%	TBD	%	TBD	%
Ganjuwa	TBD	%	TBD	%	TBD	%	TBD	%	TBD	%	TBD	%
Giade	TBD	%	TBD	%	TBD	%	TBD	%	TBD	%	TBD	%
Itas/Gadau	TBD	%	TBD	%	TBD	%	TBD	%	TBD	%	TBD	%
Jamaare	TBD	%	TBD	%	TBD	%	TBD	%	TBD	%	TBD	%
Katagum	TBD	%	TBD	%	TBD	%	TBD	%	TBD	%	TBD	%
Kirfi	TBD	%	TBD	%	TBD	%	TBD	%	TBD	%	TBD	%
Misau	TBD	%	TBD	%	TBD	%	TBD	%	TBD	%	TBD	%
Ningi	TBD	%	TBD	%	TBD	%	TBD	%	TBD	%	TBD	%
Shira	TBD	%	TBD	%	TBD	%	TBD	%	TBD	%	TBD	%
Tafawa Balewa	TBD	%	TBD	%	TBD	%	TBD	%	TBD	%	TBD	%
Tipchi	TBD	%	TBD	%	TBD	%	TBD	%	TBD	%	TBD	%
Toro	TBD	%	TBD	%	TBD	%	TBD	%	TBD	%	TBD	%
Warji	TBD	%	TBD	%	TBD	%	TBD	%	TBD	%	TBD	%
Zaki	TBD	%	TBD	%	TBD	%	TBD	%	TBD	%	TBD	%
Totals	TBD	%	TBD	%	TBD	%	TBD	%	TBD	%	TBD	%

== See also ==
- 2023 Bauchi State elections
- 2023 Nigerian presidential election
