= Bauchi (city) =

City in Nigeria

Bauchi Yakoba
- City and Local government area
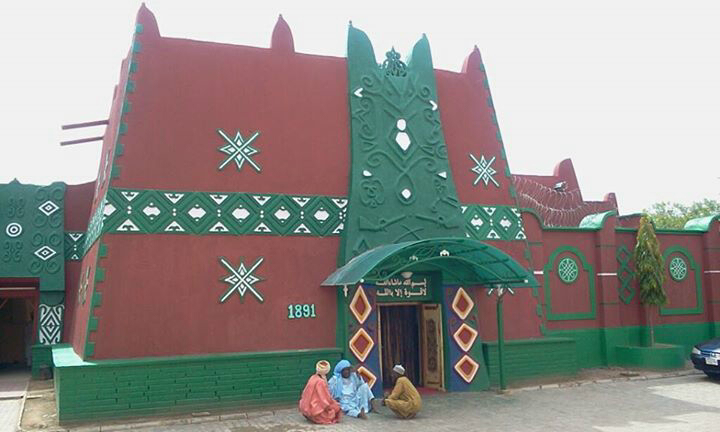
- The Emir's palace in Bauchi
- Interactive map of Bauchi
- Location in Nigeria
- Coordinates: 10°18′57″N 9°50′39″E
- Country: Nigeria
- State: Bauchi State

Government
  - Local Government Chairman: Mahmood Baba-Maji

Area
  - Total: 3,219 km^{2} (1,243 sq mi)
- Elevation: 616 m (2,021 ft)

Population (2022)
  - Total: 881,600
  - Density: 273.9/km^{2} (709.3/sq mi)
  - Ethnicities: Fulani gerawa
  - Religions: Islam; Christianity (minority)
- Time zone: UTC+1 (WAT)
- Climate: Aw

Bauchi (earlier Yakoba) is a city in northeast Nigeria, the administrative center of Bauchi State, of the Bauchi Local Government Area within that State, and of the traditional Bauchi Emirate. It is located on the northern edge of the Jos Plateau, at an elevation of 616 metres (2,021 feet). The Local Government Area covers an area of 3,687 km^{2} and had a population of 493,810 in 2006.

Bauchi City is among the twenty Local Government Areas of Bauchi state:

Bauchi, Tafawa Balewa, Dass, Toro, Bogoro, Ningi, Warji, Ganjuwa, Kirfi, Alkaleri, Darazo, Misau, Giade, Shira, Jamaare, Katagum, Itas/Gadau, Zaki, Gamawa and Damban.

== History ==
The emirate was founded in (1800–10) by Yakubu, one of Sheikh Usman dan Fodio's commanders. Yakubu conquered a sparsely wooded savanna region (the Bauchi High Plains) mainly inhabited by non-Muslim peoples. After successful campaigns, he (Yakubu) founded (1809) the town of Bauchi. Yakubu built the town’s walls, the circumference of which measures 10.5 kilometres (6.5 miles). He was the only non-Fulani flag-bearer of the Sokoto Empire. The name was derived from that of a hunter called Baushe, who advised Yaqub to build his city west of the Warinje mountain. In return Yaqub promised to name his city after the hunter.

Several of the subject peoples successfully revolted under the rule of his son and successor, Emir Ibrahim ibn Yakubu. Emir Usman moved the capital to Rauta (56.3 kilometres/35 miles northwest) in 1877, but Bauchi once again became the emirate headquarters when, in 1902, the British occupied the town and deposed Emir Umaru. The town served as the provincial capital from 1904 until 1911 and again from 1917 to 1924. In 1926 it became the headquarters of Bauchi province and in 1976, it became the capital of the newly created Bauchi state. Abubakar Tafawa Balewa is buried in the city, while the Yankari National Park is 110 km from the state capital. The city lies on the Port Harcourt – Maiduguri railway line. The Bauchi State Library Board was established in 1976. With the coming of the railway in 1961, Bauchi grew as a collecting point for peanuts (groundnuts) and cotton and a trade centre in sorghum, millet, cowpeas, corn (maize), cassava, and vegetables and in cattle, goats, and sheep. Cotton weaving and dyeing, tanning, and blacksmithing are traditional activities. The town’s industry includes an asbestos factory and a meat-products processing plant. Abubakar Tafawa Balewa University (1980; originally called Federal University of Technology) and a Federal Polytechnic are in the town. Pop. (2006) local government area, 493,810; (2016 est.) 415,000.

== Transport ==
Bauchi was originally served by a narrow gauge 762 mm (2 ft 6 in) light railway, but this was later converted to the normal gauge of 1,067 mm (3 ft 6 in).

Up until August, 2014, Bauchi was served by Bauchi Airport, located in-town. Scheduled airline service was then transferred to the newly constructed Sir Abubakar Tafawa Balewa International Airport, 23 kilometres (14 miles) north of Bauchi, near the village of Durum.

== Climate ==
In Bauchi, the dry season is partially cloudy and hot all year round, while the wet season is oppressive and overcast. The average annual temperature ranges from 14 to 37 degrees Celsius (57 to 100 degrees Fahrenheit), with occasional exceptions when it falls below 10 °C (50 °F) or rises over 40 °C (104 °F).

The greatest time of year to visit Bauchi for warm-weather activities, according to the tourist score, is from early December to early February.

According to the Köppen Climate Classification system, Bauchi has a tropical savanna climate, abbreviated "Aw" on climate maps.

Climate data for Bauchi (1991-2020)
Month	Jan	Feb	Mar	Apr	May	Jun	Jul	Aug	Sep	Oct	Nov	Dec	Year
Record high °C (°F)	38.3 (100.9)	40.0 (104.0)	43.0 (109.4)	48.0 (118.4)	42.0 (107.6)	40.0 (104.0)	36.0 (96.8)	34.0 (93.2)	35.0 (95.0)	37.0 (98.6)	38.5 (101.3)	37.0 (98.6)	48.0 (118.4)
Mean daily maximum °C (°F)	30.9 (87.6)	33.9 (93.0)	37.2 (99.0)	38.2 (100.8)	36.0 (96.8)	32.9 (91.2)	30.7 (87.3)	29.6 (85.3)	30.7 (87.3)	32.8 (91.0)	33.5 (92.3)	31.5 (88.7)	33.2 (91.8)
Daily mean °C (°F)	22.5 (72.5)	25.5 (77.9)	29.3 (84.7)	31.2 (88.2)	30.1 (86.2)	27.8 (82.0)	26.2 (79.2)	25.4 (77.7)	25.9 (78.6)	26.8 (80.2)	25.5 (77.9)	23.1 (73.6)	26.6 (79.9)
Mean daily minimum °C (°F)	14.2 (57.6)	17.2 (63.0)	21.3 (70.3)	24.3 (75.7)	24.3 (75.7)	22.6 (72.7)	21.6 (70.9)	21.3 (70.3)	21.1 (70.0)	20.7 (69.3)	17.4 (63.3)	14.7 (58.5)	20.1 (68.2)
Record low °C (°F)	6.5 (43.7)	8.9 (48.0)	11.0 (51.8)	16.1 (61.0)	16.7 (62.1)	16.7 (62.1)	17.2 (63.0)	16.7 (62.1)	14.4 (57.9)	11.8 (53.2)	9.4 (48.9)	6.1 (43.0)	6.1 (43.0)
Average precipitation mm (inches)	0.1 (0.00)	0.6 (0.02)	2.8 (0.11)	31.7 (1.25)	87.1 (3.43)	190.6 (7.50)	298.7 (11.76)	382.9 (15.07)	220.5 (8.68)	53.3 (2.10)	0.1 (0.00)	0.0 (0.0)	1,268.3 (49.93)
Average precipitation days (≥ 1.0 mm)	0.0	0.0	0.3	2.4	6.1	9.1	14.0	15.8	11.0	3.7	0.1	0.0	62.5
Average relative humidity (%)	22.8	18.7	20.8	39.6	56.5	65.4	73.8	81.8	79.6	66.6	39.2	28.6	49.4
Mean monthly sunshine hours	275.9	268.4	272.8	225.0	251.1	228.0	186.0	155.0	216.0	282.1	300.0	306.9	2,967.2
Mean daily sunshine hours	8.9	9.5	8.8	7.5	8.1	7.6	6.0	5.0	7.2	9.1	10.0	9.9	8.1
Source 1: NOAA
Source 2: Deutscher Wetterdienst (sun 1956-1961)

== Education ==
Bauchi state is an advanced center of learning in Nigeria. It has many public and private institutions, including universities owned by the state and others owned by the Federal Government of Nigeria. Other institutions present in the state are polytechnics, monotechnics, colleges of education, health technology institutions, secondary schools, and primary schools.

=== Universities and institutions ===
- Abubakar Tafawa Balewa University
- Bauchi State University
- Federal University of Health Science and Technology

=== Colleges, polytechnics and secondary schools ===
- Abubakar Tatari Ali Polytechnic
- Aminu Saleh College of Education Azare
- Federal polytechnic Bauchi
- Mohammed Goni College of Legal and Islamic Studies

== Languages ==
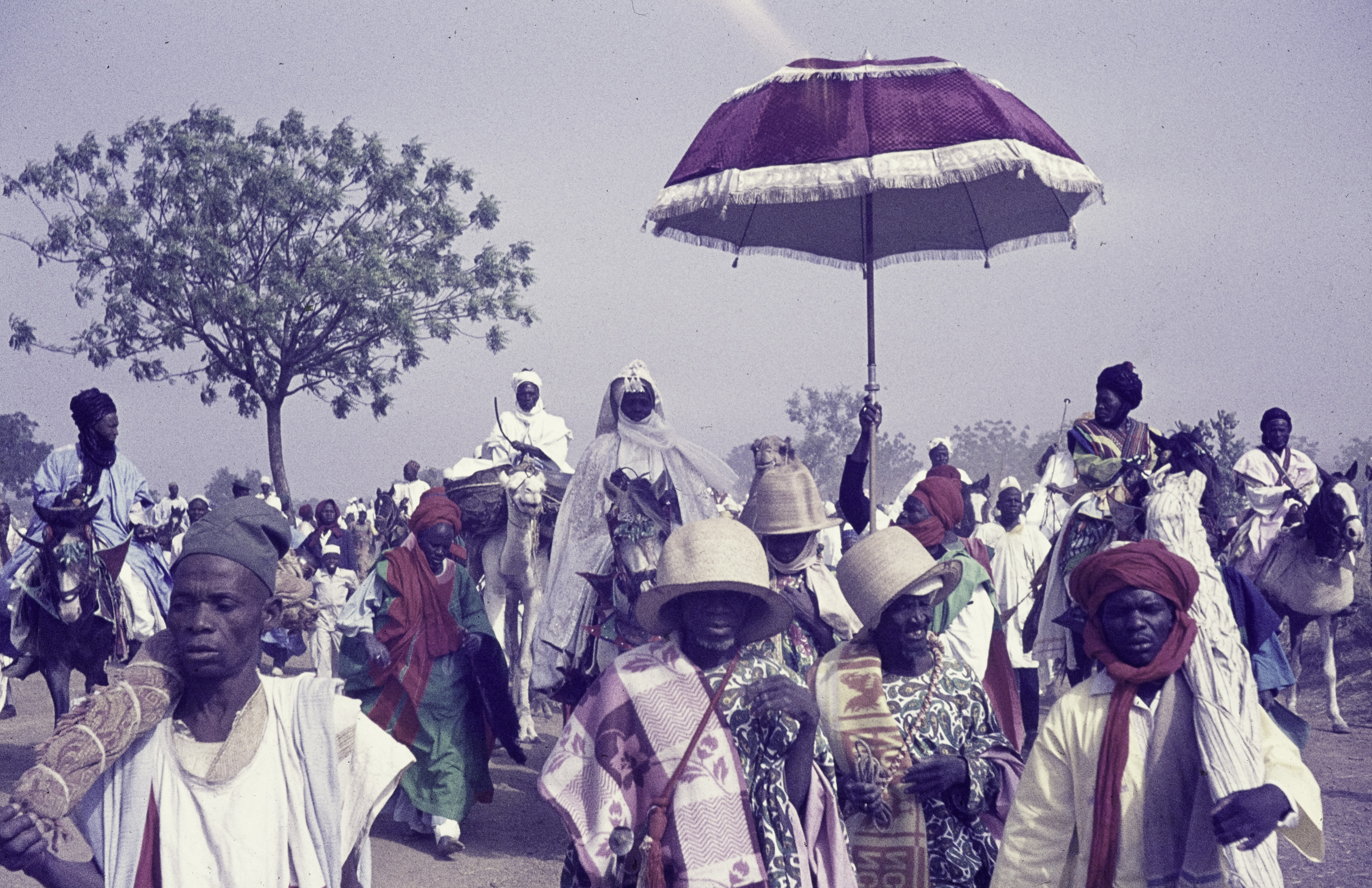
Ceremonial ruler of Bauchi under a red-white parasol on a white horse, 1970–1973.

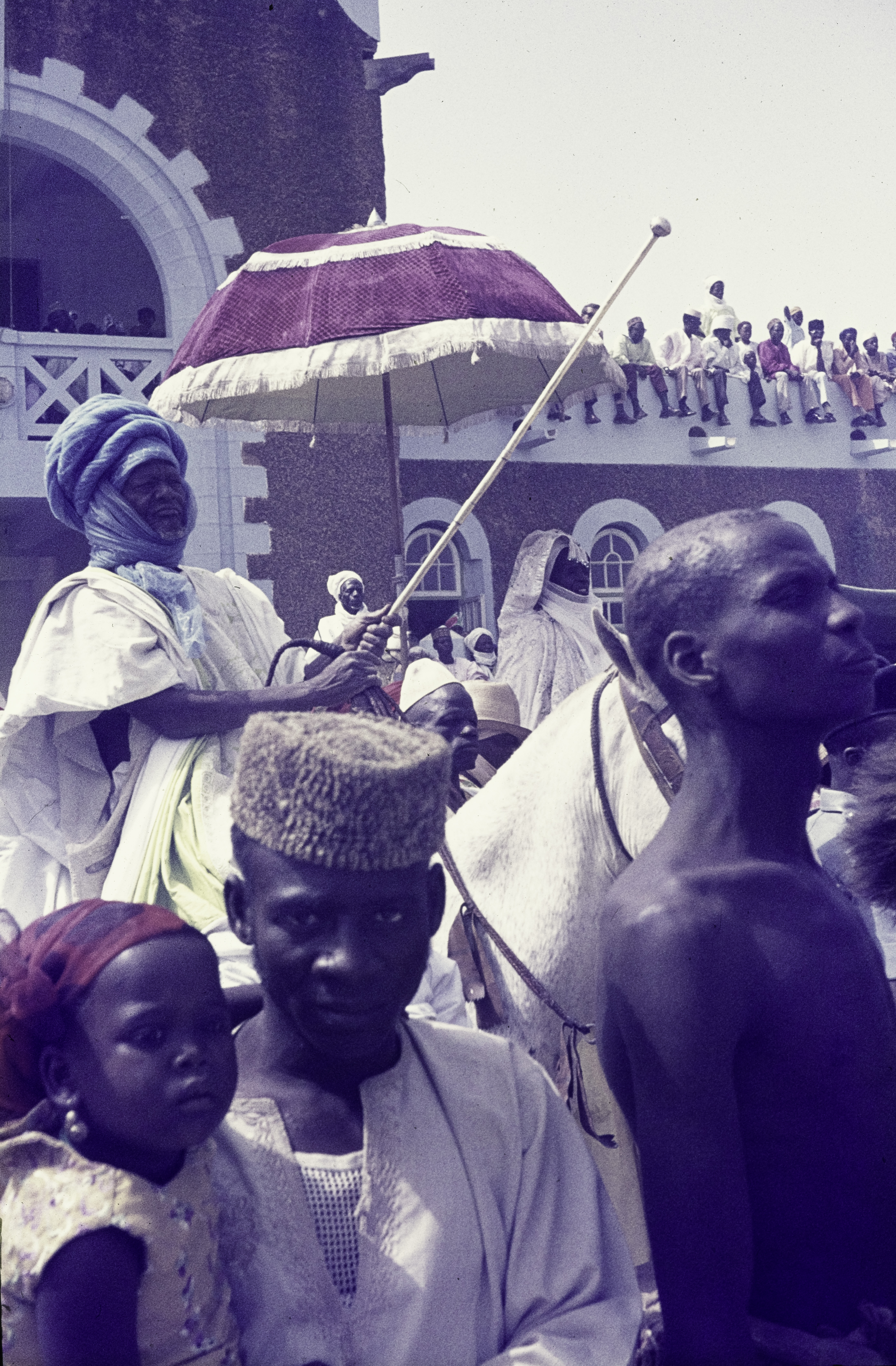
Ceremonial ruler of Bauchi under a red-white parasol on a white horse, 1970–1973.

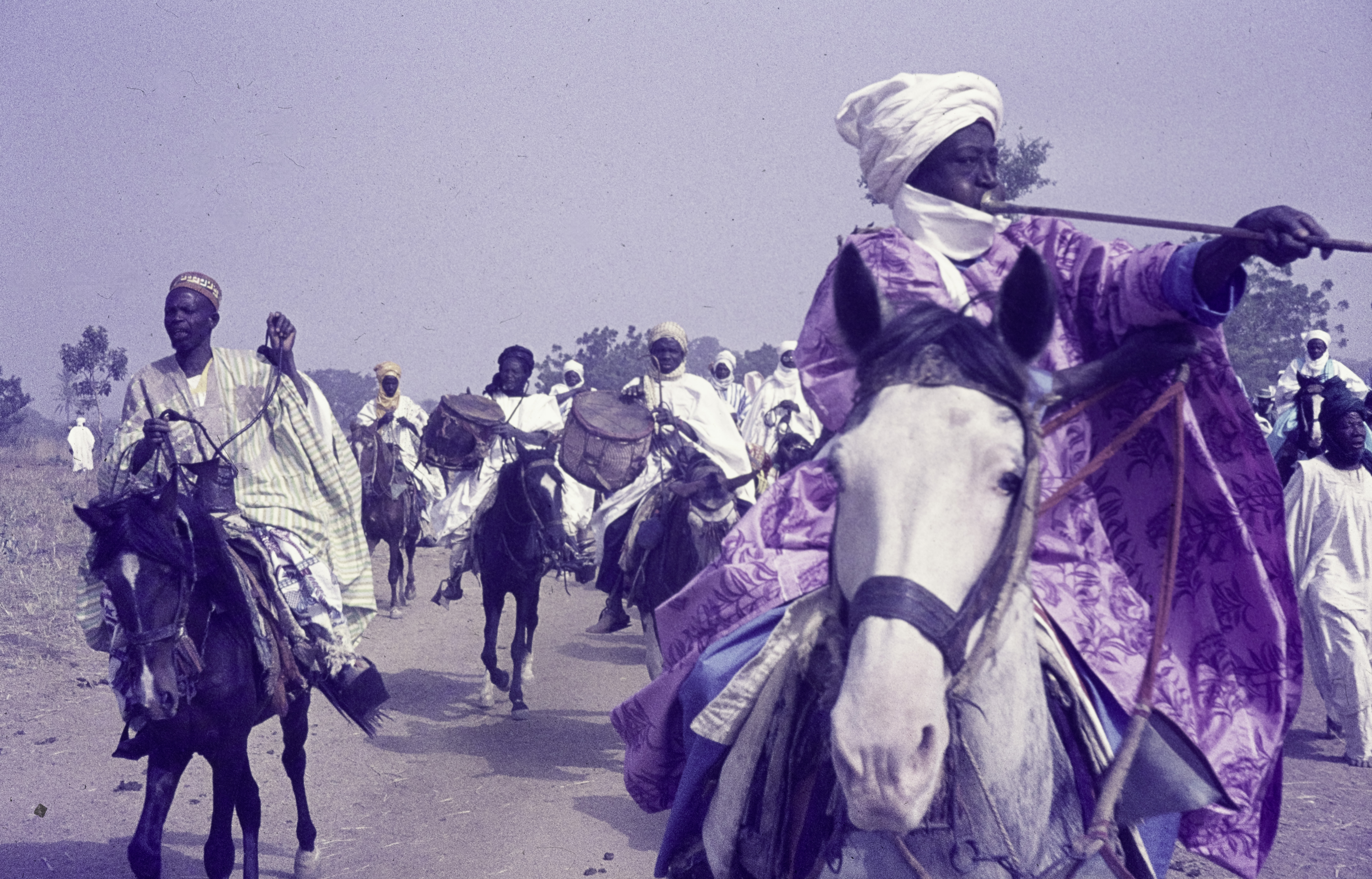
Rich horsemen at the Sallah festivities in Bauchi, 1970–1973.

- Fulani
- Gera
- Jarawa
- Gere
- Sayawa (Zaar)
- Kir-Balar language, Kir Bengbet and Kir Bajang’le villages
- Zumbun language, Darazo LGA, Jimbim settlement
- Karai-Karai
- Boyawa (Ayah) Bogoro LGA.
- Angas (Ngas) Tapshin

== Notable people ==
- John Egbunu (born 1994), Nigerian-born American basketball player for LDLC ASVEL Villeurbanne, France of the LNB Pro A and Euroleague
- Bala Mohammed Politician
- Tekno professional musician known as Tekno, Augustine Miles Kelechi Okechukwu.
- Dahiru Usman Preacher

== Natural resources in Bauchi ==
Bauchi has many occurring natural resources that are used by industries and also for commercial consumption. These include :

- Crude oil
- Limestone
- Iron ore
- Linite
- Gypsum

== See also ==
- Bauchi Light Railway
- Railway stations in Nigeria
- Abubakar Tafawa Balewa University Teaching Hospital
- Bauchi State University
