= Adamu Muhammad Bulkachuwa =

Nigerian politician

Senator for Bauchi North
- Incumbent
- Assumed office 2019

Personal details
- Born: 16 April 1940 (age 86)
- Party: All Progressives Congress (APC)
- Profession: Politician

Adamu Muhammad Bulkachuwa (Born April 16, 1940) is a Nigerian politician and the current senator representing Bauchi north senatorial district, he was elected senator during the 2019 Nigeria general elections under the All Progressive Congress (APC). He is an alumnus of Ahmadu Bello University.

== Skill training scandal and aide's death threat ==
In 2020, Bulkachuwa, along with Bauchi South Senator Lawal Yahaya Gumau, became embroiled in a scandal revolving the quality of youth and women skill training constituency projects and the amount of money allocated to the projects. In 2019, Bulkachuwa's office received around ₦169 million for "skill acquisition training and youths and women empowerment" projects in all seven local government areas in his district: Zaki, Shira, Jama'are, Gamawa, Katagum, Giade, and Itas/Gadau. Like with similar projects run by Gumau's office in Bauchi South, Bulkachuwa's training programs were criticized as substandard and not fitting the amount of money allocated for them. Reports showed that around 70 people (all with connections to local APC leadership) had been taken to a hall in Azare where they underwent short six-hour courses on random vocations. When a reporter attempted to interview participants in the program, Bulkachuwa’s legislative aide, Buba Shehu Gololo, told participants not to speak to the journalist before threatening the reporter's life, saying "I learnt that you guys are trying to speak to the beneficiaries, anybody who does any form of interview in the name of tracking empowerment training beneficiaries is just risking his life." Minutes after the death threat, Gololo called back saying "this message I’m delivering to you is directly from Senator Bulkachuwa...he asked me to tell you that anyone who interviews anybody on this project has done so at their own risk."

== Personal life ==
Bulkachuwa is the spouse of Justice Zainab Adamu Bulkachuwa, former President of the Nigeria Court of Appeal, Abuja. He also has 3 sons: Kabiru, Bashir, and Aminu and many grand children
