= Yakubu Dogara =

Nigerian politician (born 1967)

The Right Honourable Yakubu Dogara CFR
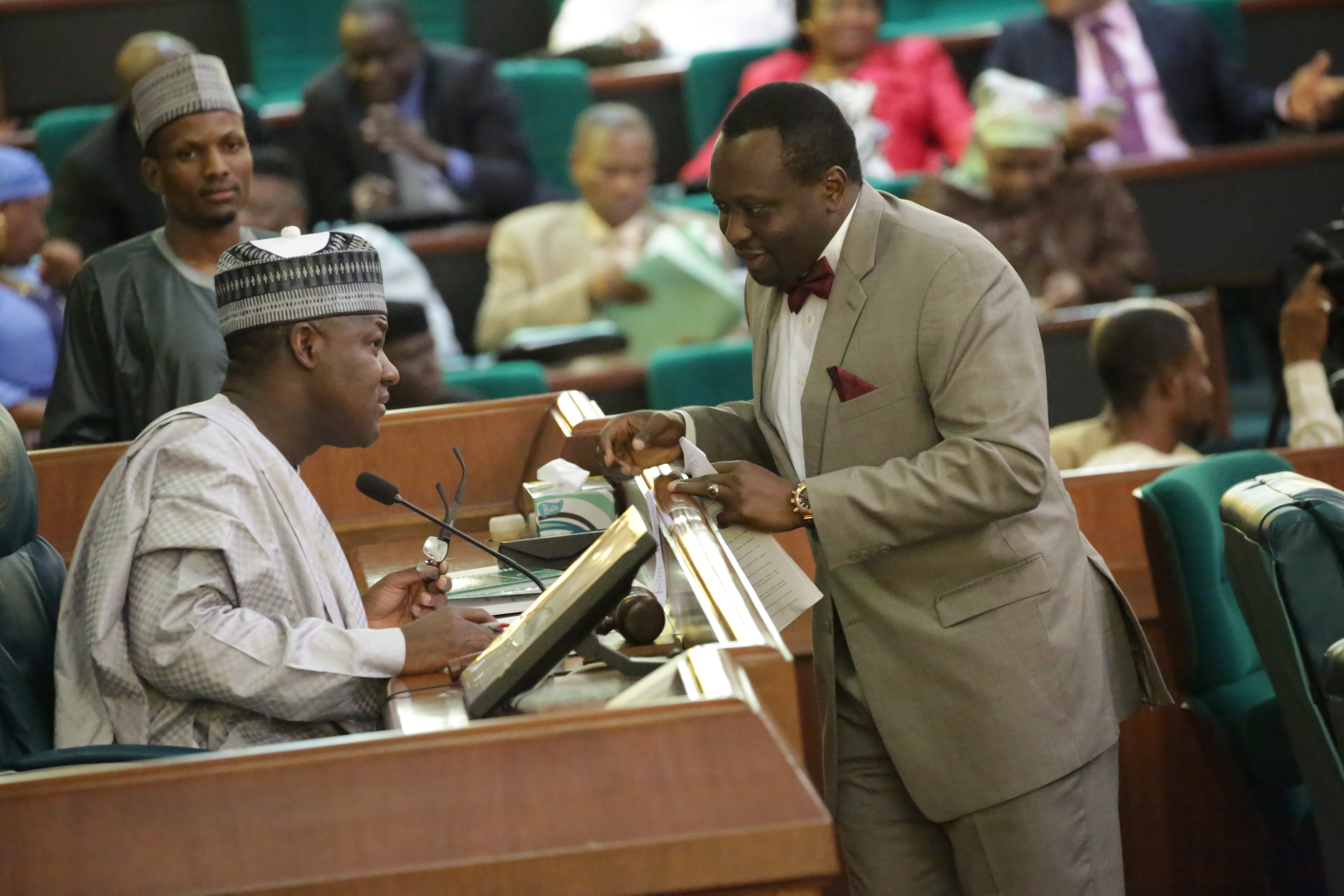
- Rt. Hon. Yakubu Dogara during plenary

13th Speaker of the House of Representatives of Nigeria
- In office 9 June 2015 – 9 June 2019
- Deputy: Yusuf Sulaimon Lasun
- Preceded by: Aminu Waziri Tambuwal
- Succeeded by: Femi Gbajabiamila

Member of the House of Representatives of Nigeria from Bauchi
- In office 5 June 2007 – 11 June 2023
- Succeeded by: Hon. Jafaru Gambo Leko
- Constituency: Dass/Bogoro/Tafawa Balewa

Personal details
- Born: 26 December 1967 (age 58) Gwarangah, North-Eastern State, Nigeria (now in Bauchi State)
- Spouse: Gimbiya Yakubu Dogara
- Education: University of Jos
- Website: dogarayakubu.net

Yakubu Dogara CFR (born 26 December 1967) is a Nigerian politician and lawyer who served as the 13th Speaker of the House of Representatives from 2015 to 2019.

Dogara is a member of the PDP. He served as the House of Representatives Member for Bogoro/Dass/Tafawa Balewa Federal constituency of Bauchi State from 2007 to 2023.

== Early life and education ==
Yakubu Dogara was born to Yakubu Ganawuri and Saratu Yakubu on 26 December 1967. He began his education in 1976 at Gwarangah Primary School in the then Tafawa Balewa Local Government Area of Bauchi State. Upon graduation in 1982, he proceeded to the Bauchi Teachers’ College for his secondary education, and obtained a Grade II Teachers' Certificate in 1987. In 1988, he went on to the University of Jos, Plateau State, from where he obtained a Bachelor of Law (LLB Hons.) degree in 1992.

From 1992 to 1993, Dogara was a student at the Lagos campus of the Nigerian Law School and was called to the bar in 1993. He later obtained a Masters (LLM) in International Commercial Law at Robert Gordon University, Aberdeen, Scotland.

Dogara also attended a course on Managing and Leading Strategic Change in 2006, the Oxford University Course on Negotiation in 2013, and a course on Leadership in Crisis at the Harvard Kennedy School in 2014. In October 2016, after he had become Speaker of the House of Representatives, he attended a course on transformational leadership in Cambridge University, United Kingdom.

== Professional career ==
He first took up employment in April 1988 as a teacher at the ATBU Staff School in Bauchi. In 1993, during the mandatory National Youth Service Corps, he served at NCCF, Akwa Ibom state. Upon completion of the NYSC programme in 1994, he went into private legal practice until 2005 when he was appointed special assistant to the Minister of State for Transport.

He held this position until 2006, when he decided to contest the Bogoro /Dass /Tafawa Balewa constituency at the Federal House of Representatives. His bid proved successful and he has been a member of the House since 2007.

== House of Representatives ==
Dogara is a strong advocate for the independence of the legislature, and has been a member of the House of Representatives since 2007. His legislative interests include tenancy, regulating monopolies, company law, and intellectual property. He has sponsored many bills and undertaken several assignments, some of which are mentioned below;

=== Committee memberships ===
During the Sixth Assembly (2007 - 2011), Dogara chaired two House committees, namely the House Committee on Customs and Excise, and the House Services Committee. During this period, he was also a member of the House committees on Judiciary, Capital Markets and Institutions, Foreign Affairs, Rural Development and Power, among others.

During the Seventh Assembly (2011-2015), he served as chairman of the committee on House Services and Welfare, and as a member of others including Judiciary, Land Transport, Labour, Employment and Productivity, Steel Development, and Legislative Budget and Research.

=== House activities and assignments ===
Dogara has also served on panels and adhoc committees in the following capacities;

- Chairman, Nigerian Customs Service Probe Panel
- Chairman, Adhoc Committee on Composition and Pigmentation of Cement in Nigeria
- Chairman, House Adhoc Committee on Disbursement of Public Funds by the Bank of Industry
- Member, House Contract Scam Probe Panel
- Member, Hijack of fishing vessels and Maritime Security Probe Panel
- Member, House Adhoc Committee on Crude Oil Theft
- Member, House Adhoc Committee on Constitutional Review

=== Bills sponsored ===
In 2010, Dogara sponsored the Corporate Manslaughter and the Data Protection Bill. These were followed by Federal Competition Commission Bill in 2011.

In 2013, he sponsored a bill for an act to amend section 143 of the Nigerian Constitution in order to make the process of removal of the president and the vice president (on charges of misconduct) less ambiguous. In the same year, he also sponsored bills on Public Interest Disclosure, and Hire Purchase.

In the Eighth Assembly, i.e. the current dispensation, Dogara has sponsored bills which include the North-East Development Commission Establishment Bill 2015, the Subsidiary Legislation Bill 2015, the Federal Competition Bill 2015, the Data Protection Bill 2015, the Public Interest Disclosure Bill 2015 and the Hire Purchase Bill 2015. He is also sponsoring the Budget Process Bill in fulfilment of his promises to reform Nigeria's budgeting process. The Bill when passed into law, according to him, will outlaw non-implementation of budgets which is the bane of Nigeria's development since 1999.

=== Motions sponsored ===
Dogara has sponsored many motions throughout the duration of his legislative career, some of which bordered on;

- An alleged concession agreement between the Ministry of Finance and a technology firm which was signed in secrecy during the government transition period
- The indiscriminate granting of waivers, exemptions and concessions by the Federal Government
- The need for the Central Bank of Nigeria to implement the cashless policy in phases based on the availability of the requisite infrastructure.
- Urgent need for both Houses of the National Assembly to activate their constitutional powers under section 58 (1) (5) of the 1999 Constitution in relation to bills over which the president has failed to exercise constitutional responsibilities and powers under section 58 (1) and (4) of the Constitution.

=== Speakership ===
Dogara was elected Speaker on 9 June 2015, after a keenly contested election. Upon winning the contest, he introduced a legislative agenda for the Eighth House which would serve as its guiding document for a period of four years.

Dogara also constituted a committee which he charged with the duty of reviewing obsolete laws, with a view to repealing or amending the necessary laws in line with global best practices. Dogara has, on many occasions, spoken about the need to update Nigeria's laws in order to attract investments and provide jobs for the nation's millions of unemployed people. As a result of the work of the stated committee, the House of Representatives set a record in December 2015 when 130 bills passed first reading in one sitting. Following that first batch of bills, another 100 were introduced in one day in June 2016. As of June 2016, after a year in office, the House had passed 85 bills through third reading; the highest in the history of Nigeria's National Assembly.

The Dogara-led House also introduced sectoral debates on the Nigerian economy, during which ministers placed in charge of different vital portfolios engaged members of the House of Representatives with a view to establishing the required legislative framework for economic stimulation and growth.

Dogara has also been lauded for his ability to manage the affairs of the House effectively and for quelling the leadership crisis which engulfed the House of Representatives following his emergence as Speaker.

Dogara is a strong advocate for the reconstruction, rehabilitation and recovery of the North-East region of Nigeria, which has been ravaged by six years of insurgency. He made history as the first ever Speaker to step down from his seat to sponsor a motion when he raised a motion on the urgent need for rehabilitation, reconstruction, recovery and development of the North-East zone of Nigeria.

He has also called on the international community to assist with rebuilding the region, and suggested convening a donor conference to achieve this. Dogara has also visited Internally Displaced Persons (IDP's) in camps across Nigeria, in Edo, Abuja, Adamawa and other states, and donated relief materials.

==== Not Too Young To Run ====
Dogara is an active supporter of the Not Too Young To Run campaign, which aims to secure representation for Nigeria's youth in the political process by lowering the age of eligibility for elective offices. He first mentioned the need to consider this reduction in the next amendment process during a meeting with student leaders drawn from across Nigerian tertiary institutions. After this, the Not Too Young to Run bill was sponsored by Tony Nwulu, a member of the House of Representatives, and the bill has since scaled second reading in the House of Representatives.

==== Local Government Autonomy ====
Dogara, as Speaker, has advocated extensively for local government autonomy in Nigeria. His support for local government autonomy is informed by his belief that it will result in greater and quicker development at grassroots level, and the House of Representatives, under his leadership, is pursuing constitutional amendments which would grant both political and financial independence to local governments.

The move has been met with commendation from different segments of the Nigerian population, including socio-cultural group and labour unions such as the National Union of Local Government Employees, among others.

==== Budget Reforms ====
The Legislative Agenda for the Eighth House - which Dogara leads - has a section on budget reforms which states that: "The House shall examine the efficacy of conducting public hearings on the Budget before legislative approval as this exposes the National Budget to increased citizen and stakeholder participation". In February 2017, during the 2017 budget cycle, both chambers of the Nigerian National Assembly - namely the Senate and the House of Representatives - held the first ever public hearing on the national budget. At the hearing, the Speaker stated that further reforms were being made to the budget process, such as setting a time frame and activity schedule for the entire budgeting process.

==== Legislative intervention on economic recession ====
Due to dwindling revenue from oil and alleged mismanagement of funds by the administration of former president Goodluck Jonathan, the Nigerian economy slipped into a recession shortly after President Muhammadu Buhari was sworn in. Upon resumption from the Christmas/New Year recess in 2017, Dogara declared that the House must focus mainly on economic growth and rejuvenation by granting expeditious passage to legislation such as the Public Procurement Act Amendment Bill, the Federal Competition Bill and the Petroleum Industry Bill. Also, in response to the hardship experienced by many Nigerians, Dogara inaugurated an ad-hoc tactical committee in February 2017, which was charged with the mandate of monitoring policies enacted by the Executive, which are geared at ending the recession. The House under Dogara had, in 2016, also introduced sectoral debates, which entailed having selected ministers engage members of the House on legislative interventions required to achieve economic diversification.

==== Other Legislative Interventions ====
Dogara has called for the completion of dredging of inland water ways to open up the country and explore the potentials of agricultural and mining sectors. In 2016, his office was instrumental in averting a strike by Nigerian resident doctors.

== Professional affiliations ==
Dogara is a member of the Nigerian Bar Association, the International Bar Association, the Nigerian Institute of Management, the Chartered Institute of Mediators and Conciliators, the Cyber Bar Association and the Social Policy Association. He is also an associate member of the Institute of Environment Management and Assessment, and the World Jurist Association, among others.

He also serves as the secretary of the board of trustees and legal adviser to FAcE-PAM, an NGO operating in Bauchi State.

== Personal life ==
Dogara is a Christian. Shortly after his election as speaker, Dogara held a thanksgiving service at Living Faith Church Worldwide. He explained that his victory was through divine placement and the teachings from the Church since 1988.

== Awards and recognition ==
He was selected as leadership Newspaper's Politician of the Year in 2015. In March 2016, he was honoured by the Royal Commonwealth Society of Nigeria for passing 130 bills in one day, and on 10 June 2016, he was presented with the Zik Prize in Leadership Award for Public Service. He was also voted Political Icon of the Year 2016 by the Editorial Board of the Sun Newspaper, and named Politician of the Year by City People Magazine at their 2017 award programme.

In October 2022, President Muhammadu Buhari conferred on Dogara Commander of the Order of the Federal Republic (CFR), a Nigerian national honour.

== See also ==
- Aminu Tambuwal
- All Progressives Congress
