= Leko =

Leko may refer to:

- Leko (surname)
- Leko Jafaru Gambo, Nigerian politician
- Leko languages, a small group of African Savanna languages
- Leco language, a moribund isolate language of Bolivia
- Lekolite or Leko, a type of stage spotlight
- Alexandro da Silva Santos or Leko, Brazilian footballer
- Leko (Arnarvon Islands), a minor island in the Arnarvon Islands

== See also ==
- Lekos (Dagestan), the ancestor-eponym of the Lek tribe of the North Caucasus
- Lecco, a town in Lombardy, Italy
