= Yusuf Tuggar =

Nigerian politician and diplomat (born 1967)

The Honourable Yusuf Tuggar OON
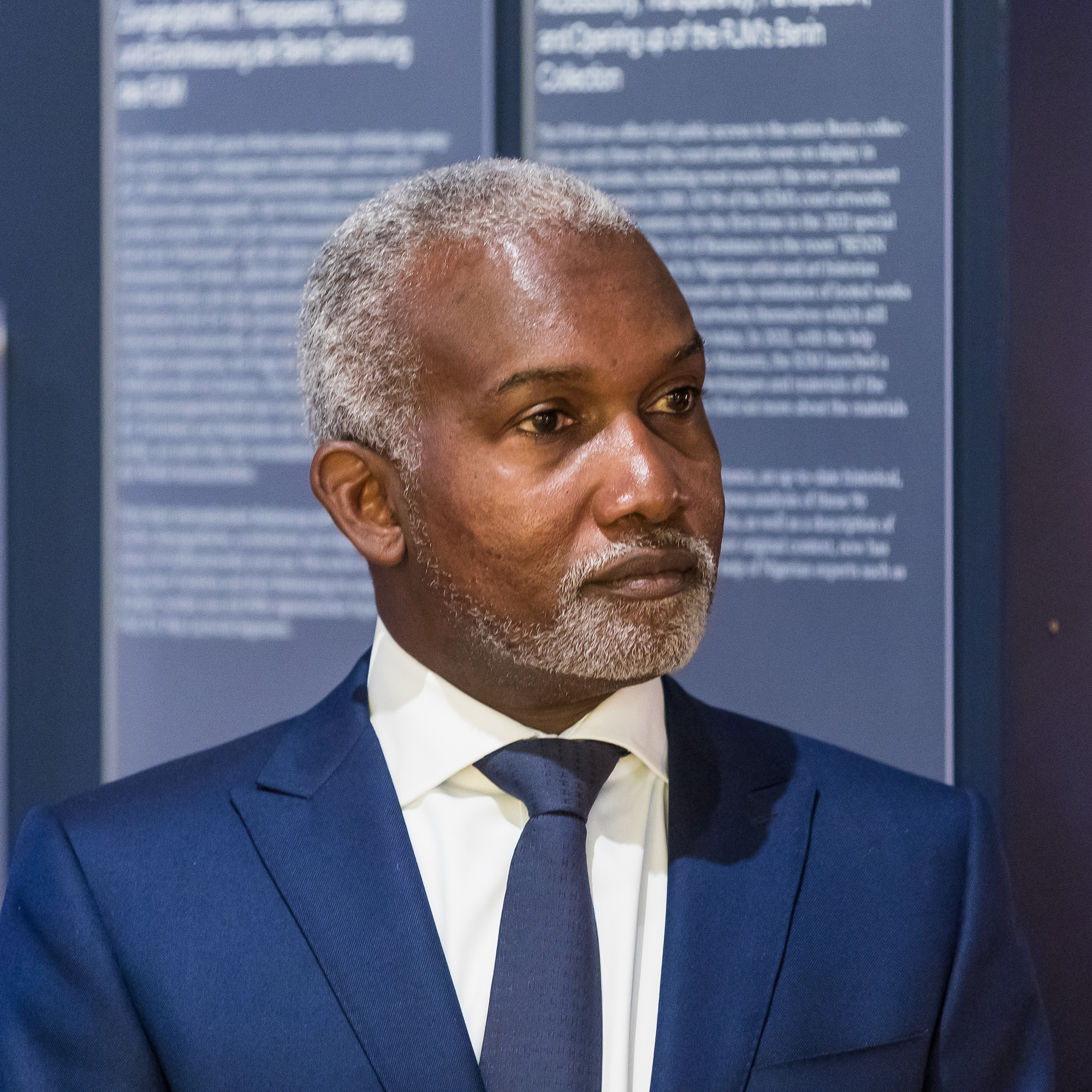

Minister of Foreign Affairs
- In office 21 August 2023 – 30 March 2026
- President: Bola Tinubu
- Preceded by: Geoffrey Onyeama
- Succeeded by: Bianca Odumegwu-Ojukwu

Nigerian Ambassador to Germany
- In office September 2017 – 21 August 2023
- President: Muhammadu Buhari; Bola Tinubu

Member of the House of Representatives of Nigeria from Bauchi
- In office 5 June 2007 – 6 June 2011
- Preceded by: Sulaiman Mohammed Nazif
- Succeeded by: Ahmed Gololo
- Constituency: Gamawa

Personal details
- Born: 12 March 1967 (age 59) North-Eastern State, Nigeria
- Party: All Progressives Congress (2013–present)
- Other political affiliations: All Nigeria Peoples Party (until 2011); Congress for Progressive Change (2011–2013)
- Parent: Abubakar Tuggar (father)
- Education: United States International University; University of Bath; University of Cambridge
- Occupation: Politician; diplomat

Yusuf Maitama Tuggar OON (born 12 March 1967) is a Nigerian diplomat and politician who was a former Nigerian minister of foreign affairs from 21 August 2023 to 30 March 2026. He served as the Nigerian Ambassador to Germany from 2017 to 2023. He was previously a member of the Nigerian House of Representatives from 2007 to 2011 representing Gamawa; and he ran twice for the office of the governor of Bauchi State.

== Family ==
Tuggar was born into a political family in Bauchi State (Gamawa), his father, Abubakar Tuggar, was the Publicity Secretary of the ruling Northern People's Congress before and during the First Republic. As a member of the National Party of Nigeria, he represented Gamawa at the House of Representatives during the Second Republic.

== Education ==
Tuggar received a bachelor's degree in international relations from the United States International University. He also attended the University of Bath, and has master's degree from the University of Cambridge.

== Early career ==
After graduating, Tuggar spent several years in the private sector. He was the chief executive officer of Nordic Oil and Gas Services, an energy consulting firm. Tuggar was also a contributor on political and economic opinions in Nigerian newspapers and magazines.

== Political career ==
=== House of Representatives ===
Tuggar represented Gamawa from Bauchi State in the Nigerian House of Representatives from 2007 to 2011. He served as the Chairman of the House Committee on Public Procurement, regulating government spending in the oil and gas industry, education, health and water resources, the committee worked on separating the president's cabinet from affairs of awarding contracts.

He also oversaw the creation of the National Council on Public Procurement, and was the member of the house committee that worked on Local content bill with a focus in oil and gas. He was also as a member of the house committees on foreign affairs and was the deputy chairman of the house on Public Petitions. He sponsored a bill on inhumane transport of livestock on the floor of the house.

=== Governorship elections ===
In 2011, Tuggar ran for office of the Governor of Bauchi State as the candidate of the Congress for Progressive Change, Tuggar came in second after the election was marred with fraud and violence. In 2013, he joined the ruling All Progressives Congress and contested the governorship primaries coming in third. He also contest in 2026 APC governorship primary of the APC in Bauchi and lost to the former governor, Mohammed Abdullahi Abubakar via a consensus. He rejected the emergence of the APC candidate and called for a fresh primary election.

=== Ambassador to Germany ===
In August 2017, Tuggar was appointed the Nigerian Ambassador to Germany by President Muhammadu Buhari. During his ambassadorship, Tuggar played a key role during the 23rd Session of the Conference of the Parties to the United Nations Framework Convention on Climate Change. He also facilitated the state visit of the German Chancellor Angela Merkel to Nigeria in August 2018.

In March 2020, Tuggar attended a meeting held with Siemens in Germany over projects in the Nigerian power sector, the chief of staff to the president Abba Kyari who tested positive for COVID-19. Tuggar ordered the closure of the embassy in Berlin, and himself was tested negative. Kyari later died on 17 April 2020.

As Ambassador, Tuggar initiated the repatriation of lost Benin artefacts from the German government leading to the return of 22 Benin Bronze looted artefacts valued at over 100 million pounds.

Tuggar completed his term as Ambassador to Germany on Monday, 21 August 2023 when he was sworn in as the Minister of Foreign Affairs. The oath of office was administered by the Chief Justice of Nigeria, Olukayode Ariwoola.
