= Lawal Yahaya Gumau =

Nigerian politician (1968–2025)

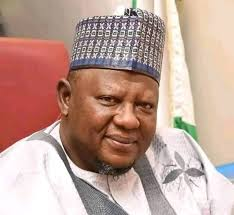

Senator of the Federal Republic of Nigeria representing Bauchi South
- In office 2018–2023 Serving with Suleiman Nazif; Isah Misau
- Preceded by: Malam Wakili

Personal details
- Born: Lawal Yahaya Gumau; 26 August 1968 Bauchi, Nigeria
- Died: 22 February 2025 (aged 56)
- Party: All Progressive Congress
- Education: Bauchi State Polytechnic; University of Maiduguri, Borno State (BSc)
- Profession: Businessman politician

Lawal Yahaya Gumau (26 August 1968 – 22 February 2025) was a Nigerian politician, who served as a Senator from Bauchi South Senatorial District, from 2018 until 2023. Prior to becoming a senator, Gumau served for two terms in House of Representatives representing the Toro Constituency. He became a Senator by winning 119,489 votes to defeat his closest rival, Ladan Salihu of the Peoples Democratic Party, who received 50,256 votes to win a 2018 by-election due to the death of Senator Malam Wakili.

Gumau was a philanthropist, who aided in the provision of jobs and education for youths. He died on 22 February 2025, at the age of 56.

== Early life and education ==
Gumau was born on 26 August 1968 in Gumau, Toro Local Government Area of Bauchi State, Nigeria. He attended Gumau Primary School before proceeding to Government Secondary School, Toro. He later obtained a National Diploma in Accounting from the Federal Polytechnic, Bauchi and a bachelor's degree in Accounting from the University of Maiduguri.

== Political career ==
Gumau began his political career in the Bauchi State House of Assembly, where he represented the Toro Constituency. He later served as Speaker of the Bauchi State House of Assembly.

In 2018, Gumau was elected to the Senate of Nigeria in a by-election to represent the Bauchi South Senatorial District following the death of Ali Wakili. He served in the 8th Senate under the All Progressives Congress (APC).

He was re-elected to the Senate in the 2019 general election and continued to represent Bauchi South Senatorial District in the 9th National Assembly.

== Skill training scandal ==
In 2020, Gumau, along with Bauchi North Senator Adamu Muhammad Bulkachuwa, became embroiled in a scandal revolving the quality of skill training constituency projects and the amount of money allocated to the projects. In 2019, Gumau's office received around ₦80 million for "empowerment and training in dry-season farming in Tilde, Toro LGA and empowerment of youths in Agricultural practices and development in Bauchi South senatorial district."

As with similar projects run by Bulkachuwa's office in Bauchi North, Gumau's training programmes were criticized as substandard and not fitting the amount of money allocated for them. Gumau's programmes were supposed to be run by the Federal College of Horticulture, Dadin Kowa; however, the school's Provost refused to accede to a Freedom of Information request on the school's involvement and reporting showed that the programmes were actually run by a local NGO, African Unity Foundation.

After the training, some of which lasted only a few hours while others were a month long, participants reported receiving no equipment or funds to continue their new skill and lamented that they had to return to their original occupations after the course. The participants were also party-based as people were chosen based on their (or their family's) connections to local APC leadership.
