= Mansur Manu Soro =

Nigerian politician

Mansur Manu Soro is a Nigerian politician and lawmaker. He currently serves as the Federal Representative for the Darazo/Ganjuwa constituency of Bauchi State in the 10th National Assembly.
