= Samaila =

Samaila may refer to:

== Places ==
- Samaila (Kraljevo), a village in Kraljevo municipality, Serbia
- Sămăila, a village in Priboieni municipality, Argeș County, Romania

== People ==
- Samaila Bature Chamah (died 2007), Nigerian military administrator
- Samaila Dahuwa Kaila, Nigerian politician
- Samaʼila Mamman, Nigerian politician
- Samaila Suleiman (born 1981), Nigerian politician
