= Mashema =

Mashema may refer to:

- Bashir Uba Mashema, a member of the Nigerian federal House of Representatives
- A village in Bauchi, Nigeria
- A semaglutide drug from Zydus Lifesciences
