= Kafin Madaki =

Coordinates: 10°41′8″N 9°45′47″E

Kafin Madaki is the headquarters of Ganjuwa Local Government Area of Bauchi State, Nigeria. It is a small town of about 20,000 people, located some 45 km north of Bauchi. The economy is based primarily on farming, with cottage industries in weaving, iron-working, soap-making and brick-making. Water supply is based on boreholes. In March 2008 the Bauchi state government started reconstruction of the General Hospital at Kafin Madaki, which had fallen into disrepair. The state Commissioner of Health inspected the construction of the new hospital in May 2010, and announced plans to hire additional medical personnel.

In September 2009, Bauchi state governor Isa Yuguda agreed to implement a plan laid out by his predecessor Adamu Mu'azu to turn the 52-year-old Yankari Game Reserve into an international ecotourism destination. The plan included housing about 300 "foreign" animals from Namibia including giraffe, eland, kudu, impala and zebra in an area of about eight square kilometres near Kafin Madaki.

This area was highlighted in the 2018 film Up North.
