= Ibrahim Mohammed Baba =

Nigerian politician

Federal Representative
- In office 2015–2019
- Constituency: Katagum

Personal details
- Occupation: Politician

Ibrahim Mohammed Baba is a Nigerian politician. He served as a member of the House of Representatives representing Katagum Federal Constituency of Bauchi State in the 8th National assembly between 2015 and 2019.

== Early life and education ==
Baba was born in 1976 in Bauchi State, Nigeria. He attended Government Science Secondary School and later obtained a National Diploma from Kaduna Polytechnic in 1998. He received a bachelor's degree in Accounting from the University of Abuja in 2006 and a master's degree in Finance from the same university in 2008.

== Political career ==
Baba is a member of the All Progressives Congress (APC). He was elected to the House of Representatives in the 2015 general election to represent Katagum Federal Constituency of Bauchi State. He served in the 8th National Assembly from 2015 to 2019. After completing his term in the House of Representatives. He rejoined the APC in2023.
