= Ganjuwa =

Ganjuwa Kafin Madaki
- Local government area
- Interactive map of Ganjuwa
- Country: Nigeria
- State: Bauchi State
- Headquarters: Kafin Madaki

Government
  - Local Government Chairman: Mohammed Idris Miya

Area
  - Total: 5,059 km^{2} (1,953 sq mi)

Population (2006)
  - Total: 280,486
  - Density: 55.44/km^{2} (143.6/sq mi)
- Time zone: UTC+1 (WAT)
- 3-digit postal code prefix: 742

Ganjuwa is a Local Government Area of Bauchi State, Nigeria. It was carved out from the Darazo Local Government in September, 1991 and it is bordered with Jigawa State to the north and Gombe State to the southeast. The Local Government also shares borders with the following Local Governments: Bauchi Local Government to the south, Toro Local Government to the west, Ningi Local Government to the northwest, Darazo Local Government to the North South East and Kirfi Local Government to the east.

Based on the 2006 Population Census figure, the Local Government has a population of 280,486 with numerous tribes/languages, but prominent among them are Gerawa, Denawa, Miyawa, Kariyawa, Hausawa, and Fulanis. Ganjuwa Local Government now has one District, eight Village Areas and 122 Hamlets. The Madaki of Bauchi is the District Head of Ganjuwa, and the King maker of the Bauchi Emirate.

Its headquarters are in the town of Kafin Madaki 47 kilometers from the State Capital along Kano Road. The most urban towns of the Local Government are Kafin Madaki at the centre being the Local Government Administrative Headquarter, Soro from the East, Miya from the West.

It has an area of 5,059 km^{2} and the postal code of the area is 742.

== Climate ==
It is most hot in April and May. It is most cold in January. It is most windy in June, with 31 km/h (19 mph) average. It is most wet in August, with 210 mm (8.25 in).

== Religion ==
Ganjuwa is predominantly Muslim, along with following of Christian and traditional religions.

== Educational Institutions ==
Ten Post Primary Institutions, Government Girls’ College Kafin Madaki (Special School), Government Day Secondary School each at Kafin Madaki, Miya, Nassarawa, Yali, Nabayi, Sabon Kariya, Zalanga and Gungura. Government Secondary School Soro and Technical College, Kafin, Madaki.

== Commercial and Industrial Activities ==
Some few cottage industries exist in rural areas like soap making, knitting, weaving established by some women groups and bakery, brick moulding, block moulding, semi industry poultry, etc.
