= Muhammed Dan Abba Shehu =

Nigerian politician

Member of House of Representatives of Nigeria from Bauchi
- Incumbent
- Assumed office 13 June 2023
- Preceded by: Tata Omar
- Constituency: Zaki

Personal details
- Born: 4 December 1964 (age 61)
- Party: Peoples Democratic Party (PDP)

Muhammed Dan Abba Shehu (born 4 December 1964) is a Nigerian politician and a member of the 10th Federal House of Representatives representing the Zaki constituency under the platform of People's Democratic Party (PDP).

In 2024, Shehu sponsored a motion advocating for free medical treatment for pregnant women at public health institutions during and after childbirth. He referenced a United Nations Children's Fund (UNICEF) report, emphasising Nigeria's high infant mortality rate and the critical need to improve healthcare delivery systems, particularly for pregnant women, "to alleviate their hardships and boost their confidence".
