= Aliyu Aminu Garu =

Nigerian politician

Honourable Aliyu Aminu Garu

Member of the 10th House of Representatives
- Incumbent
- Assumed office June 2023
- Constituency: Bauchi Federal Constituency

Personal details
- Born: 30 September 1962 (age 63) Bauchi State
- Party: Peoples Democratic Party (PDP)
- Occupation: Politician

Aliyu Aminu Garu is a Nigerian politician at the House of Representatives level. He serves as the Federal Representative representing Bauchi constituency in the 10th National Assembly. He has sponsored 8 bills and moved motions at the National Assembly. Prior to this, he served as the chairman of Bauchi Local Government during the administration of Governor Ahmed Muazu in early 2000.

== Early life and education ==
Aliyu Aminu Garu was born on September 30, 1962, near Alkali Aminu House along Gombe Road in Bauchi, Nigeria. He pursued higher education, earning an Advanced Diploma.

== Career ==
Garu is a member of the Peoples Democratic Party (PDP). He entered politics and won the House of Representatives seat for Bauchi Federal Constituency with 37,760 votes. He has been the acting member representing Bauchi since June 2023.

== Controversy ==
In 2024, his wife, Hajiya Fatima Aminu Aliyu Garu, faced public backlash after distributing sugarcane sticks as part of an empowerment initiative for youths in Bauchi. Critics argued that the gesture was insufficient and symbolic of a lack of substantive action by Garu and his family to address the pressing economic challenges in his constituency. This sparked debates on social media about the priorities of elected officials in delivering impactful community programs.

== Philanthropy ==
Garu is recognized for his involvement in community development and empowerment programs. In 2024, he initiated an empowerment scheme within Bauchi Federal Constituency, distributing cash and fertilizer worth ₦85 million to youth, women, and vulnerable civilians. This initiative aimed to enhance agricultural productivity and financially relieve struggling families.

Garu invested in infrastructure development within his constituency. He facilitated the installation of solar-powered streetlights across various communities. He supported education by donating materials to schools and sponsoring underprivileged students for higher education.
