= Leko Jafaru Gambo =

Nigerian politician

Leko Jafaru Gambo is a Nigerian politician. He currently serves as the Federal Representative representing Bogoro/Dass/Tafawa Balewa constituency of Bauchi State in the 10th National Assembly.
