= Leko (surname) =

Leko is a surname. Notable people with the surname include:

- Dimitrije T. Leko (1863–1914), Serbian architect
- Ivan Leko (born 1978), Croatian footballer
- Jerko Leko (born 1980), Croatian footballer
- Jonathan Leko (born 1999), Congolese-English footballer
- Josip Leko (born 1948), Croatian politician and Speaker of the Croatian Parliament
- Marie-Joseph Leko, politician from Congo-Brazzaville
- Marko Leko (1853–1932), Serbian chemist and president of the Serbian Red Cross
- Mislav Leko (born 1987), Croatian football defender
- Peter Leko (born 1979), Hungarian chess player
- Stefan Leko (born 1974), German-Croatian kickboxer
