= Tipchi =

Viallage in Bauchi State, Nigeria

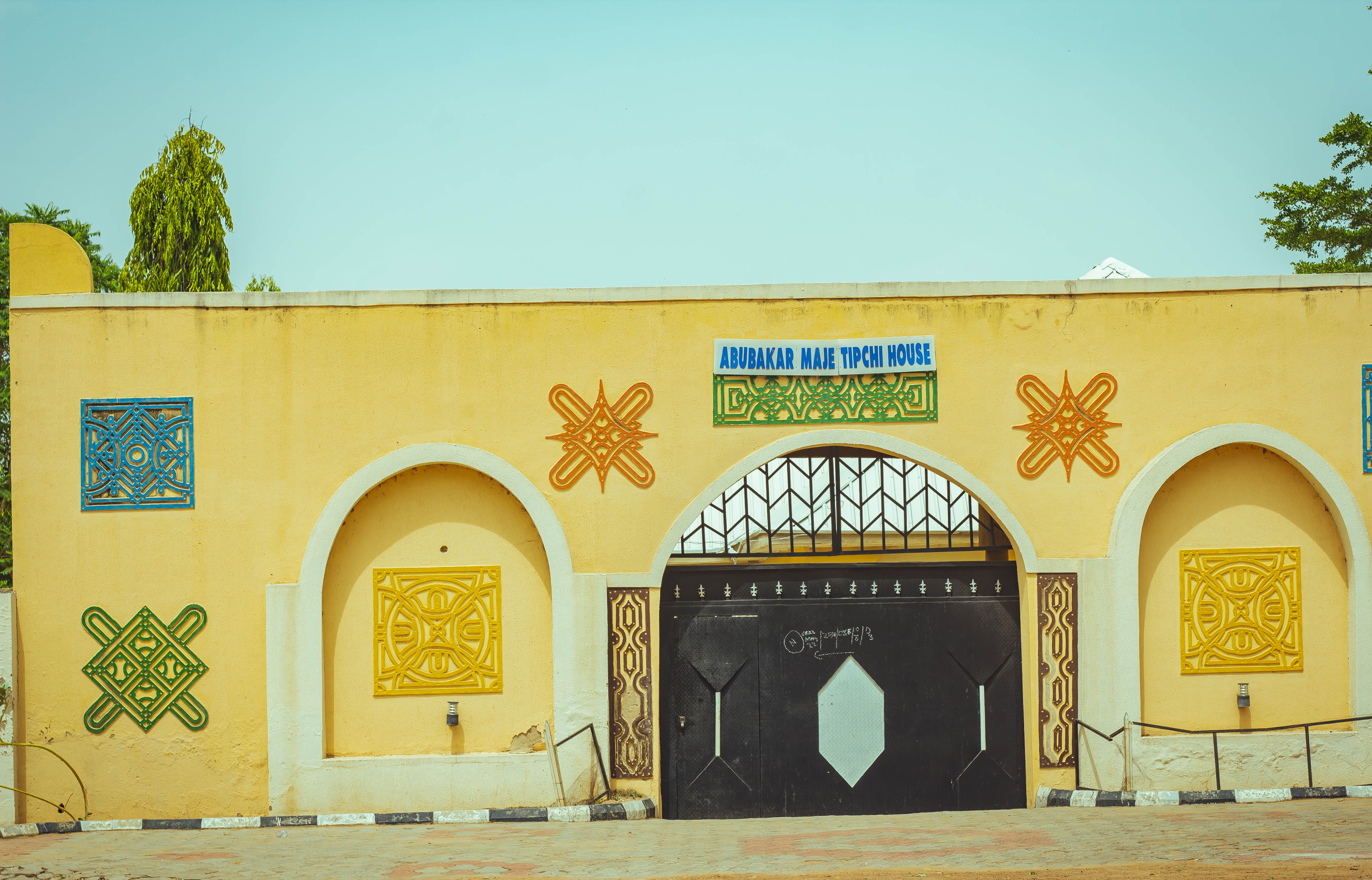
- The Museum of Tipchi

- Location in Nigeria
- Country: Nigeria
- State: Bauchi State
- Local Government Area: Ningi, Nigeria
- District Region: Burra-Tipchi

Population
  - Religions: Islam Christianity
- Postal code: 742102
- Climate: Aw

Tipchi is a village located in Burra district region of Ningi, Bauchi State, Nigeria. It has a postal code 742102. The village is a home settlement of the Yipchi community and is one of the historical places in Bauchi State. The popular historical house of Tipchi House is situated in this village.

== See also ==
- Ningi, Nigeria
- Jama'are River
