= Ahmed Gololo =

Nigerian politician

Ahmed Madaki Gololo is a Nigerian politician. He was a two-term member of the House of Representatives representing the Gamawa Federal Constituency of Bauchi State in the 9th National Assembly.
