= Bashir Uba Mashema =

Nigerian politician

Member of the House of Representatives of Nigeria
- In office 2019–2023
- Constituency: Jama'are/Itas-Gadau

Personal details
- Party: All Progressives Congress
- Occupation: Politician

Bashir Uba Mashema is a Nigerian politician. He was a Federal House of Representative member, representing Jamaare/Itas Gadau Federal Constituency of Bauchi State in the 9th National Assembly.
