= Isa Hassan Jama'are =

Nigerian politician

Member of the House of Representatives of Nigeria
- Incumbent
- Assumed office 1999
- Constituency: Jama'are/Itas-Gadau Federal Constituency

Personal details
- Party: All Progressives Congress (APC)
- Occupation: Politician

Isa Hassan Jama'are (born 30 September 1964) is a Nigerian politician who represents the Jama'are/Itas-Gadau Federal Constituency of Bauchi State in the House of Representatives. He was first elected to the House of Representatives in 1999 and has subsequently been re-elected in successive general elections.

== Early life and education ==
Jama'are was born on 30 September 1964 in Bauchi State, Nigeria. He obtained a Bachelor of Science degree from the University of Jos.

== Political career ==
Jama'are was elected to represent the Jama'are/Itas-Gadau Federal Constituency in the House of Representatives in 2003 under the platform of the People's Democratic Party (PDP). During his legislative career, he has served on several House committees, including the Committee on Defence and the Committee on Solid Minerals Development.

He has sponsored and supported legislation relating to governance and constituency development during his tenure in the National Assembly.
