= Zumbun language =

Language spoken in Nigeria

Zumbun
- Jimbin
- Native to: Nigeria
- Region: Bauchi State
- Native speakers: (2,000 cited 1995)
- Language family: Afro-Asiatic: Chadic; West Chadic; Bade–Warji; Warji (B.2); Zumbun

Language codes
- ISO 639-3: jmb
- Glottolog: zumb1240

Zumbun (also rendered Jimbin, Jimbinawa) is an Afro-Asiatic language spoken in Bauchi State, Nigeria, in Jimbim settlement, Darazo LGA.
