= Marie-Joseph Leko =

Republic of the Congo politician (born 1925)

Marie-Joseph Leko was a politician from Congo-Brazzaville.

He was born in Renéville on July 14, 1925. He worked as an education supervisor in Pangala. Leko was elected to the Legislative Assembly (which later became the National Assembly of the Republic of the Congo) in the 1959 election, standing as a candidate of the Democratic Union for the Defense of African Interests (UDDIA) in the Fourth Constituency (Brazzaville).
