= Mohammed Goni College of Legal and Islamic Studies =

Mohammed Goni College of Legal, Islamic and Educational Studies
- Type: Public
- Established: 1981
- Affiliations: University of Maiduguri
- Provost: Dr Bashir Umar Bashir
- Location: Maiduguri, Borno State, Nigeria
- Website: portal.mogcolis.edu.ng or admissions.mogcolis.edu.ng

The Mohammed Goni College of Legal Islamic and Educational Studies Studies is a state government higher education institution established in 1981, located in Maiduguri, Borno State, Nigeria. The institution awards NCE certificates and Diplomas, including those in Law. Dr Bashir Umar Bashir is the current provost of the institution.

== Courses ==
The institution offers the following courses:

- Early Childhood Care Education
- Kanuri
- History
- Primary Education
- Biology
- Political Science
- Hausa
- English
- Geography
- Islamic Studies
- Arabic
