= Abubakar Tatari Ali Polytechnic =

Tertiary Institution in Nigeria

Coordinates: 10.3072°N 9.7696°E

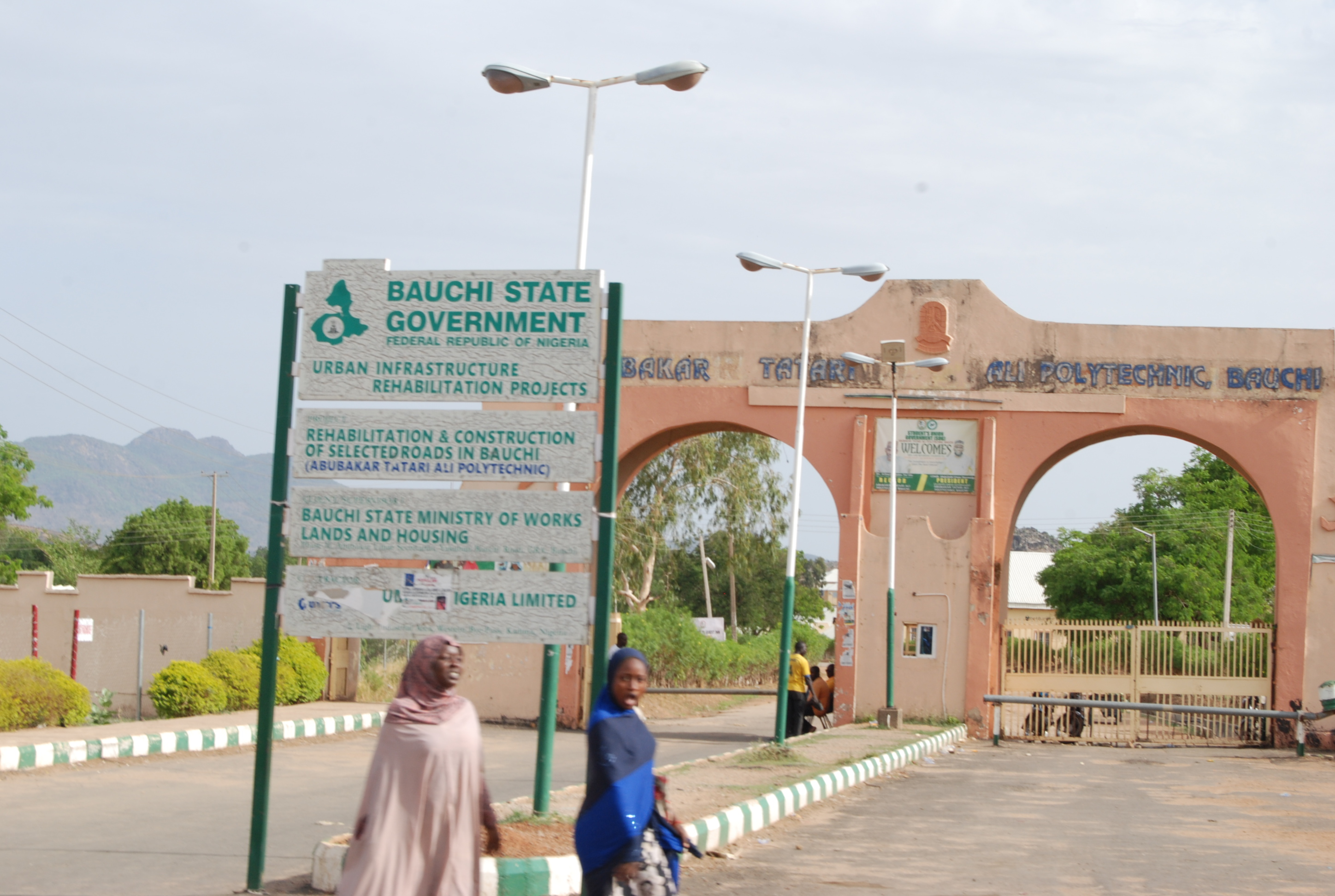
- Entry Gate of Abubakar Tatari Ali Polytechnic Bauchi
- Motto: Technology for self reliance
- Type: Polytechnic
- Established: 1988
- Rector: Hashim Bello
- Location: Bauchi Town, Bauchi State, Nigeria
- Colors: Crimson and green
- Website: atapoly-bauchi.edu.ng

Abubakar Tatari Ali Polytechnic, popularly known as ATAP, is a state-owned tertiary institution in Bauchi State, Nigeria. It was established by Edict No. 1 of 1988. The institution offers National Diploma and Higher National Diploma courses at undergraduate levels. There are seven unit schools in two campuses of the polytechnic.

== Courses offered in Abubakar Tatari Ali Polytechnic ==
School of Engineering (SOE)

- National Diploma n Electrical Electronics
- ATC Electrical Electronics
- Diploma in Computer Engineering
- National Diploma in Mechanical Engineering
- ATC Welding and Fabrication
- ATC Auto Mechanic
- Diploma Welding Fabrication
- National Diploma in Civil Engineering
- ATC Wood Work
- HND EE – Electronics Communication
- HND Mechanical Engineering- Manufacturing opt.
- HND Civil Engineering Technology
- HND Mechanical Engineering Technology
- National Diploma Computer Engineering Technology
- Pre- HND EE- Electronics Communication
- Pre-HND Mechanical Engineering- Manufacturing opt.

SCHOOL OF GENERAL STUDIES (SGS)

1. Diploma in Crime Management and Control.
2. National Diploma in Social Development
3. National Diploma in Mass Communication

SCHOOL OF SCIENCE AND TECHNOLOGY

- National Diploma in Computer Science
- National Diploma in Tourism
- National Diploma in Science Lab Tech
- National Diploma in Statistics
- National Diploma in Geological Technology
- National Diploma in Surveying and Geo-Informatics
- Certificate in Science Lab Tech
- HND Computer Science
- HND Statistics
- HND Geological Technology
- HND SLT- Biochemistry
- HND SLT- Physics Electronics
- HND SLT -Microbiology
- HND SLT -Chemistry
- PRE-HND SLT - Microbiology
- PRE-HND SLT - Physics Electronics
- PRE-HND SLT - Biochemistry
- PRE-HND SLT - Chemistry

SCHOOL OF ENVIRONMENTAL TECHNOLOGY (SET)

- National Diploma in Estate Management
- ATC Building Technology
- Diploma in Architectural Technology
- National Diploma in Urban and regional Planning
- National Diploma Survey and Geo-Informatics
- National Diploma Quantity Survey
- HND in Estate Management and Evaluation
- HND Building Technology
- PRE-HND Estate Management and Evaluation
- PRE-HND Building Technology

=== School of Vocational and Technical Education ===
- NCE COURSES
- National Diploma in Library and Information Science
- NCE Agricultural Education
- NCE Business Education
- NCE Biology/Physics Education
- NCE Chemistry/Biology Education
- NCE Chemistry/Physics Education
- NCE Computer/Integrated Science Education
- NCE Integrated Science Education
- NCE Mathematics/Computer education
- NCE Mathematics/Physics Education
- NCE Early Childhood care and Education
- NCE Primary Education
- NCE Technical Education

PRE-NCE COURSES

- PRE-NCE Agric Education
- PRE-NCE Business Education
- PRE-NCE Chemistry/Biology Education
- PRE-NCE Chemistry/Physics Education
- PRE-NCE Computer/Integrated Science Education
- PRE-NCE Early Childhood Care and Education
- PRE-NCE Integrated Science Education
- PRE-NCE Mathematics/Physics Education
- PRE-NCE Primary Education
- PRE-NCE Technical Education
- PRE-NCE Mathematics/Computer Education
- PRE-NCE Biology/Physics Education

School of information and office technology Management

- Diploma in Library and Information Science
- Certificate in Assistant Library Officer
- Diploma in office Technology and Management
- Certificate in Confidential Secretary IV
- Certificate in Confidential Secretary III
- Certificate in Confidential Secretary II
- Certificate in Confidential Secretary IV

School of Management Studies (SMS)

- Certificate in Assistant Store Officer
- Certificate in Public Accounts and Audit
- National Diploma in Accountancy
- National Diploma in Public Accounts and Audit
- National Diploma in Business Admin and Mgt.
- Certificate in Banking and Finance
- Diploma in Marketing
- Diploma in purchase and supply
- Certificate in Management
- Certificate in Marketing
- National Diploma in Local Government Studies
- National Diploma in Public Administration
- Certificate in Public Administration
- National Diploma in Banking and Finance
- Certificate in Banking and Finance
- HND in Public Administration
- HND Business Admin and Management
- HND accountancy
- Diploma in Community Development
- Certificate in Local Government Studies
- Certificate in Purchasing and Supply
- National Diploma in Taxation
- Certificate in Taxation
- Diploma in cooperative and Economic Management
- Diploma in Insurance
- Diploma in Entrepreneurship
- PRE-HND Public Administration
- PRE-HND Business Admin and Management
- PRE-HND Accountancy

== The Polytechnic Library ==
The main Library has information resources related to the courses offered in the institution with staffs that collect, organize, process and disseminate those information to both staffs and students of the polytechnic.

== Gallery ==
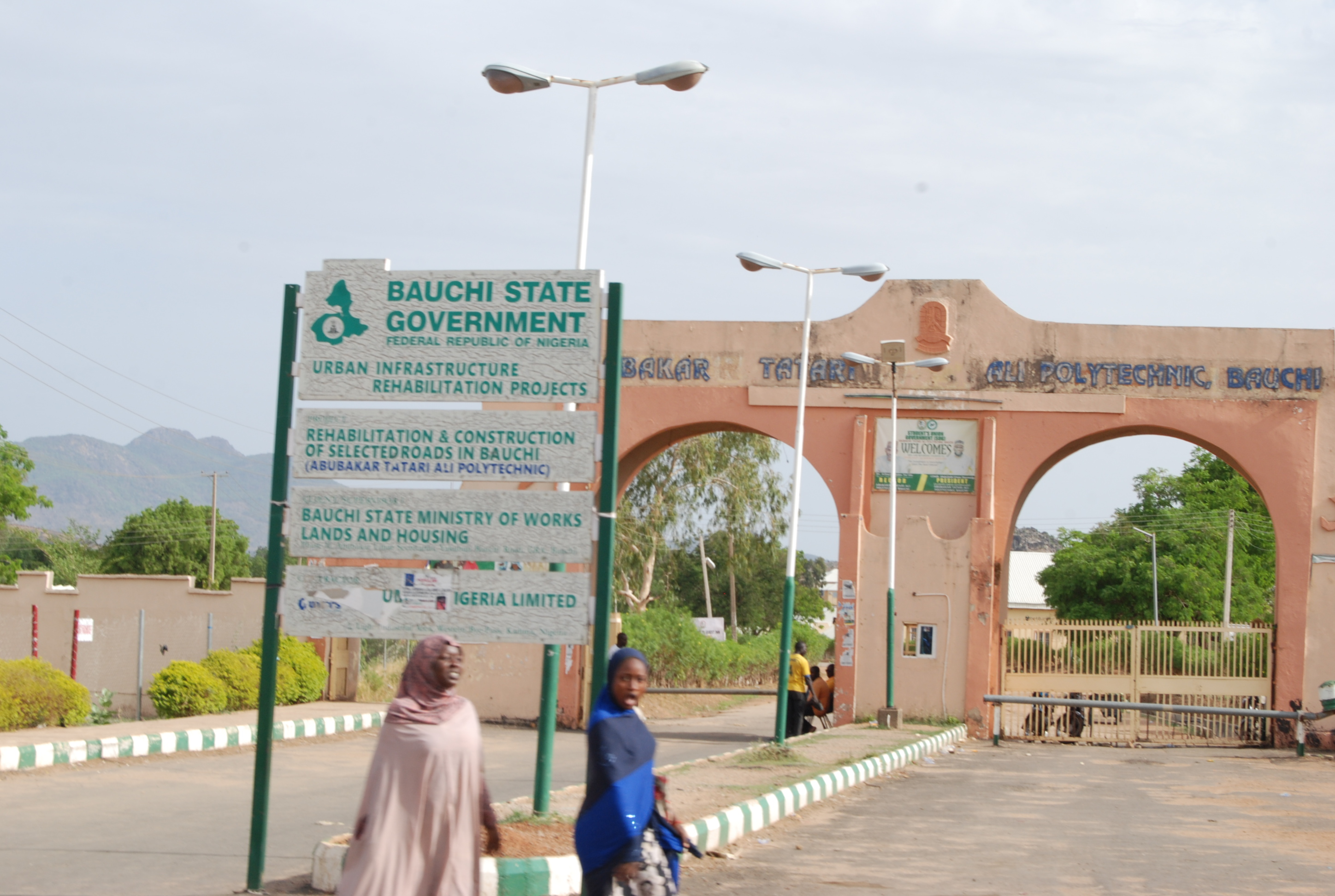

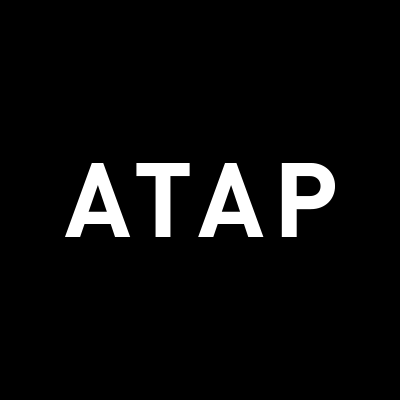
