= Aminu Saleh College of Education =

Educational institution in Nigeria

Coordinates: 11°40′21″N 10°12′14″E

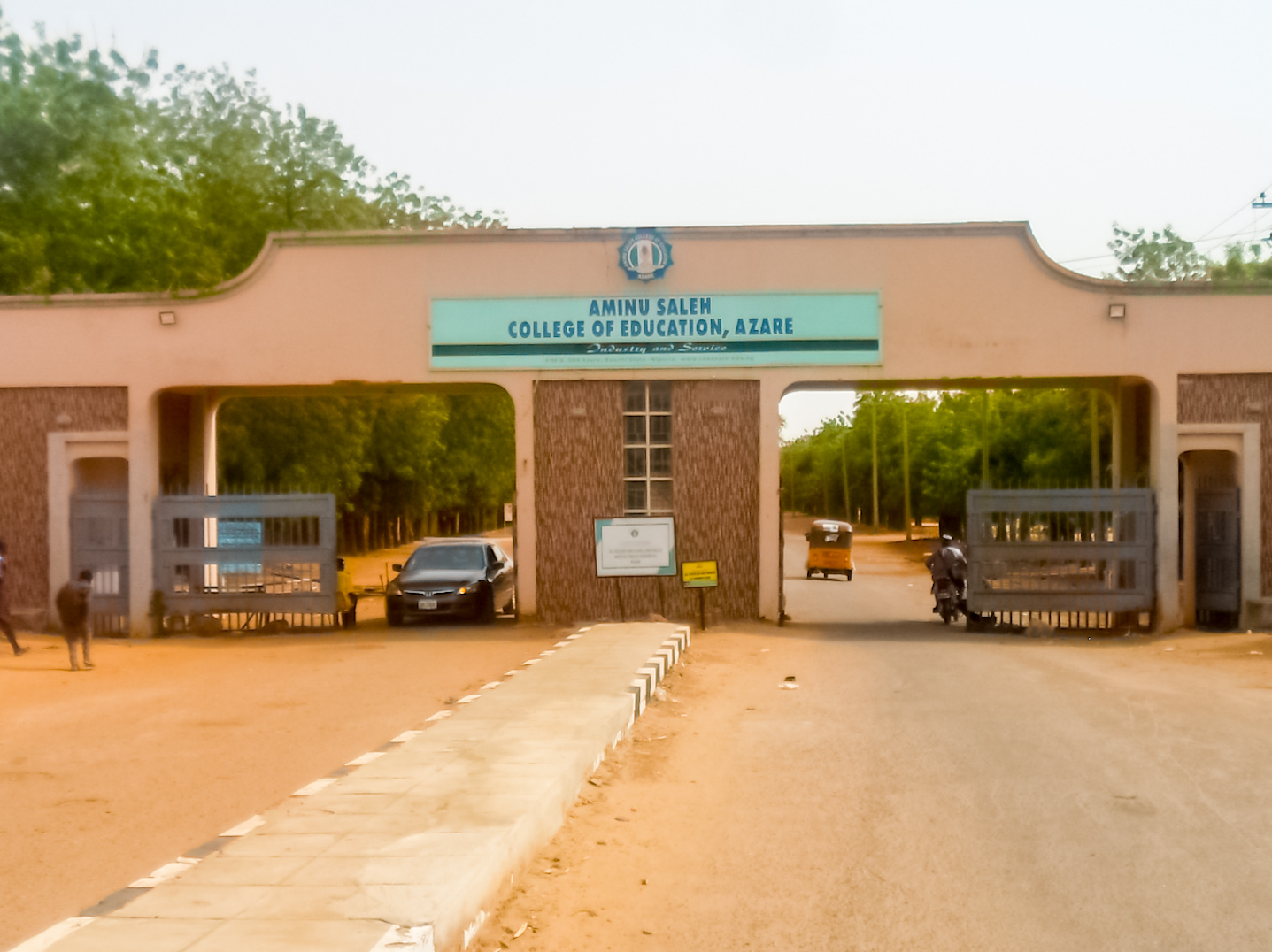
- Aminu Saleh College of Education Azare Entry Gate
- Type: Public
- Established: 1977
- Provost: Professor Sadiya Asabe Mohammed
- Location: Azare, Bauchi State, Nigeria
- Affiliations: University of Maiduguri
- Website: ascoea.edu.ng

The Aminu Saleh College of Education is a state government higher education institution located in Azare, Bauchi State, Nigeria. It is affiliated to University of Maiduguri for its degree programmes. The current Provost is Abdullahi Mohammed Isyaku.

== History ==
The Aminu Saleh College of Education was established in 1977. It was established as Advanced Teachers’ College.

== Courses ==
The institution offers the following courses;

- Curriculum Studies
- Business Education
- Educational Foundations
- Home Economics
- Educational Psychology
- Technical Education
- Christian Religious Studies
- Physical And Health Education
- Islamic Studies
- Social Studies

== Affiliation ==
The institution is affiliated with the University of Maiduguri to offer programmes leading to Bachelor of Education, (B.Ed.) in;

- Biology
- English
- Arabic
- Islamic
- Economics
- Hausa
- Chemistry
- Physical Education
- Business Education
- Mathematics
- Physics
- Agriculture
- Health Education
