= Samaila Dahuwa Kaila =

Nigerian politician

Samaila Dahuwa Kaila is a Nigerian politician. He currently serves as a Senator representing the Bauchi North Senatorial District in the 10th National Assembly. He previously held the position of Commissioner for Health in Bauchi State.
