= Tafawa Balewa, Bauchi State =

Tafawa Balewa
- LGA and town
- Interactive map of Tafawa Balewa
- Coordinates: 9°45′41″N 9°32′59″E
- Country: Nigeria
- State: Bauchi State
- Headquarters: Bununu

Government
  - Local Government Chairman: Sama'ila Wakili Lere

Area
  - Total: 2,451 km^{2} (946 sq mi)

Population (2022)
  - Total: 395,200
  - Density: 161.2/km^{2} (417.6/sq mi)
- Time zone: UTC+1 (WAT)

Tafawa Balewa is a town and local government area in the southern part of Bauchi State in northern Nigeria. Its headquarters was in the eponymous town, but was shifted to Bununu town in 2011 due to constant unrest in the former.

== History ==
"Tafawa Balewa village takes its name from two corrupted Fulani words: "Tafari" (rock) and Baleri (black)."

The area has been known for sectarian and ethnic violence over the years. The major ethnic groups are the Sayawa, Hausa and Fulani . An Associated Press story states, "The Sayawas are in the majority in the town and its surrounding villages, but their traditional rulers have been of the predominantly Muslim Fulani ethnic group. The Sayawas have demanded a separate traditional ruler, which has led to attacks and counterattacks over the past two decades."

Tafawa Balewa town is inhabited by Jarawa, Fulani, Hausa, Sayawa, Kanuri, Tapshinawa (angas) and other tribes. The town has been a hot-bed of communal crises that have lingered for over 50 years; as witnessed in 1948, 1959, 1977, 1991, 1995, 2001, 2005, 2010, 2011 and 2012, with hundreds of lives lost and property worth millions of naira destroyed. The bone of contention of the frequent clashes in the area has to do with the chieftaincy and ownership of Tafawa Balewa town.

In 2011, 38 people died in violence that began after an argument in a snooker hall, and Kutaru, Malanchi, Gongo, Gumel, and Gital villages were burned down in a reprisal attack.

In 2011, Bauchi State, Governor Isa Yuguda "threatened to demolish Tafawa Balewa town with the exception of government institutions like hospitals and schools," telling residents “You should either embrace peaceful coexistence or stand the risk of total ejection from Tafawa Balewa. I shall direct the complete demolition of the town for peace to reign.” An "emergency joint stakeholders meeting of Muslims and Christians representatives of Tafawa Balewa and Bogoro local government areas" was held, and an agreement reached that the residents would remain peaceful and abide by the law.

In 2012, "the state government through the House of Assembly finally resolved to relocate the headquarters of the local government to Bununu town." Tafawa Balewa Local Council Headquarters was moved to Bununu District. The district head was moved to Zwal Village. The Sayawa Council of Elders and Traditional Rulers in Tafawa Balewa and Bogoro local councils of Bauchi State condemned the relocation. Hon. Rifkatu Samson Danna, representing Bogoro Constituency and the only female member of the Bauchi State House of Assembly, was suspended from her post after her opposition to the decision. As of 8 May 2012, Bununu lacked "several social amenities such as water, electricity, office accommodation, working materials, staffers' accommodation and lack of good access roads to the temporary local government secretariat." In 2013, Hon. Yakubu Dogara (PDP/Bauchi) The chairman, House of Representatives Committee on House Services, said "the attempt to relocate the headquarters of the local council from Tafawa Balewa town to Bunu was not only a contravention of the constitution but an action designed to cause disaffection among the people of the state."

The Sayawa language is spoken in Tafawa Balewa LGA.

== Notable people ==
Abubakar Tafawa Balewa was born in December 1912 in Tafawa Balewa village.

== Climate ==
In Tafawa Balewa, the dry season is partially cloudy and hot all year round, while the wet season is oppressive and overcast. The average annual temperature ranges from 15 to 36.7 degrees Celsius (59 to 98 degrees Fahrenheit), rarely falling below 12 °C (54 °F) or rising over 39 °C (102 °F).
