= Damban =

Dambam
- LGA and town
- Interactive map of Dambam
- Coordinates: 11°37′45″N 10°47′8″E
- Country: Nigeria
- State: Bauchi State

Government
  - Local Government Chairman: Yakubu Garba Tela

Area
  - Total: 1,077 km^{2} (416 sq mi)

Population (2022)
  - Total: 268,200
  - Density: 249.0/km^{2} (645.0/sq mi)
- Time zone: UTC+1 (WAT)
- Postal code: 751

Damban or Dambam is a Local Government Area of Bauchi State, Nigeria. Its administrative headquarter is located in the town of Dambam. It has two district Dagauda and Jalam.

It has an area of 1,077 km^{2} and a population of 150,922 at the 2006 census.

The postal code of the area is 751.

== Background ==
Damban local government area is one of the local government areas in Bauchi state. It has its administrative headquarters in Damban town. It is located in north Bauchi and shares borders with Darazo, Misau, Katagum and Gamawa local government areas. The Dambam local government area council oversees the public administration in the local government area and the legislative council makes laws governing the local government area.

== Climate ==
Averaging 123.2 wet days and 91.42 millimetres or 3.599 inches of precipitation each year, Dambam's temperature is 1.38% higher than the national average for Nigeria at 30.84 °C (87.51 °F).
