= Alkaleri =

- LGA and town
- Interactive map of Alkaleri
- Location in Nigeria
- Coordinates: 9°53′N 10°30′E
- Country: Nigeria
- State: Bauchi State

Government
  - Local Government Chairman: Hassan Garba Bajama

Area
  - Total: 5,918 km^{2} (2,285 sq mi)

Population (2006 census)
  - Total: 329,424
  - Density: 55.66/km^{2} (144.2/sq mi)
- Time zone: UTC+1 (WAT)
- 3-digit postal code prefix: 743
- ISO 3166 code: NG.BA.AL

Alkaleri is a town and Local Government Area of Bauchi State, Nigeria on the A345 highway.

It has an area of 5,918 km^{2} and a population of 329,424 at the 2006 census. The predominant ethnic group in the area are the Fulani with some Kanuri, Dugurawa, Guruntawa, and Labur ("Jaku") people present.

== Districts ==
The districts of the local government are Pali, Duguri, and Gwana. Major towns and villages of the local government like Fanti, Gar, Gokaru, Guma, Gwaram etc. including the local government headquarters, Alkaleri are located in the Pali district.

== Climate ==
The rainy season in Alkaleri is oppressive and cloudy, the dry season is partly cloudy, and it's hot all year round. The average annual temperature fluctuates between 59 °F and 101 °F, rarely falling below 54 °F or rising over 105 °F.

With an average daily high temperature of 98 °F, the hot season lasts for 2.4 months, from February 24 to May 4. With an average high of 100 °F and low of 76 °F, April is the hottest month of the year in Alkaleri.

The cool season lasts for 2.7 months, from July 11 to October 3, with an average daily high temperature below 31 °C (88 °F). The coldest month of the year in Alkaleri is January, with an average low of 16 °C (60 °F).
