= Katagum =

- City
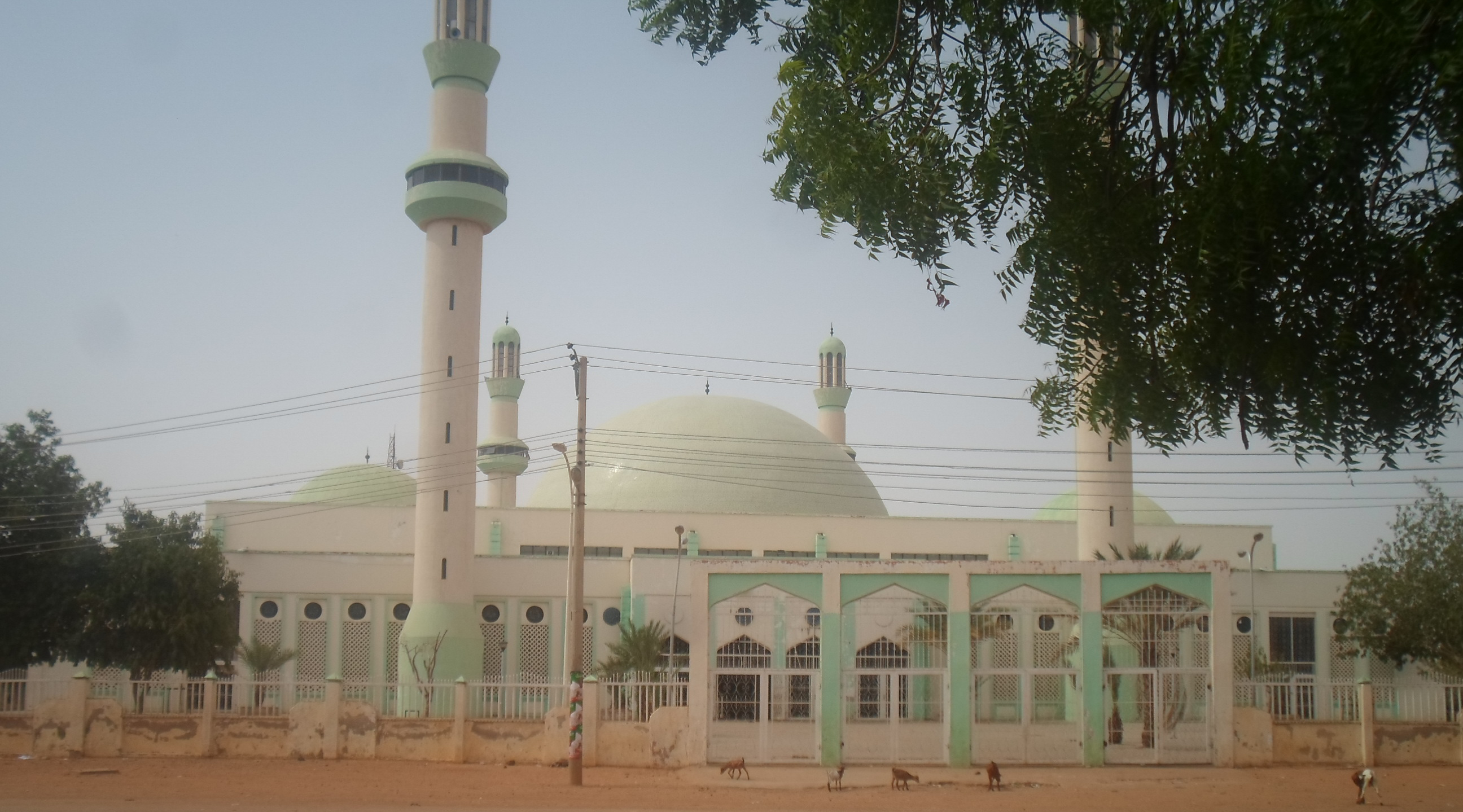
- Katagum Emirate Central Mosque

- Location in Nigeria
- Coordinates: 12°17′N 10°21′E
- Country: Nigeria
- State: Bauchi State

Area
  - Total: 1,436 km^{2} (554 sq mi)

Population (2022)
  - Total: 523,200
  - Density: 364.3/km^{2} (943.7/sq mi)
- Time zone: UTC+1 (WAT)
- Postal code: 752

Katagum is a town, a traditional emirate and the capital of Zaki LGA in Bauchi State of north eastern Nigeria. The town is located on the northern bank of the Jama'are River, which is a tributary of the Hadejia. Most of the inhabitants are people from the Fulani, Kanuri, Karai-karai and Hausa ethnic groups. The chief agricultural products include peanuts (groundnuts), sorghum, millet, rice (especially in the riverine fadamas, or "floodplains"), cowpeas, cotton, indigo, and gum arabic. Livestock include horses, cattle, goats, sheep, donkeys and a lot of poultry.

== Local government area ==
The town of Katagum is the administrative centre of Zaki Local Government Area (LGA). The Katagum is a completely separate and distinct LGA south of the Zaki LGA, from which it is separated by the Itas/Gadau LGA; Katagum LGA thus does not include the town of the same name; it has an area of 1,436 km^{2} (554 sq mi) and a population of approximately 295,970 at the 2006 census; its administrative centre is Azare with a population of more than 50% of the whole Katagum population. The postcode is 752.

== Climate ==
The city experiences stifling heat, uncomfortable conditions, and a preponderance of clouds throughout the wet season. Throughout the dry season, the region can also have stifling heat and partial cloud cover.

== Air pollution ==
Katagum's air is contaminated with particulate matter, which can be harmful to public health, as it undergoes chemical reactions from emissions from vehicles and industries.

== History ==
Originally, it was the seat of an emirate founded around 1807 by Ibrahim Zakiyul Kalbi (aka Malam Zaki), a soldier in the Fulani jihad. In 1812, he destroyed the capital of the Kanem–Bornu Empire, Ngazargamu, 115 mi east north-east of Katagum, and was named king of Bornu by the leader of the jihad, Usman dan Fodio. After his victory, Malam Zaki returned to the area and founded Katagum in 1814. A decade later, when the Scottish explorers Hugh Clapperton and Walter Oudney visited Katagum, they found it had two surrounding walls, each 20 ft in height with a 10 ft base and four gates. There was also a community mosque, and trade was accomplished using cowrie shells for currency. Oudney died in Katagum that same year, 1824, and was buried at Murmur, a settlement on the south.

During the mid-to-late 1820s, Bornu recaptured most of the area from the Fulani, forcing the Katagum community to evacuate in 1826. Later that year, their Kanuri tribal warriors, were defeated 90 mi west south-west at Fake by a joint coalition led by Yakubu, the king of Bauchi, and Dan Kauwa, Katagum's Emir (amir), with an emirate to the south. Returned to Fulani control, the Katagum emirate was prosperous until the 1850s, when wars with Amir Buhari of nearby Hadejia diminished them greatly.

In 1903, after the fall of Kano city (130 mi west) to the British, it became part of Katagum Province, which was then made a division of Kano Province in 1905. In 1916, the seat was transferred to Azare (43 mi south-southwest). A decade later, the emirate was merged into Bauchi Province.

== Alhaji Dr. Muhammad Kabir Umar, late emir of Katagum ==
Katagum Emirate in Bauchi State is the second largest emirate next to Bauchi Emirate in terms of population and size as it is made up of six local government areas out of the twenty that made up Bauchi State.

Katagum is the headquarters of Bauchi North Senatorial District as well as the center of all social and political activities in the state. Katagum is bordered by Borno in the North and East and in the West by Kano. The hottest period in Katagum is in the month of March and April while August is the coldest. The people are predominantly Muslims. Christians are very few who are not-indigenous of the Katagum zone while some few ones were incorporated to Christianity due to missionaries' activities from the colonial years. The people's culture in the emirate is influenced by Islam which placed premium on respect for the elders by the younger ones. Their marriages are conducted in accordance with Islamic injunctions while the major languages for communication are: Hausa, Fulani and Kanuri just as the main food and cash crops are beans, groundnuts, cotton, maize, millet, cassava, guinea corn. Katagum's land is very good and fertile for farming.

The Emirate is largely inhabited by Hausa/Fulani, Beriberi, Karai-karai, Lerawa and Badawa. The prominent among them are the Hausa/Fulani and Beriberi who are said to be friendly and accommodating to visitors. These people are easily identified when they appear in the common apparel worn by old men such as big-flowing gowns with inner jumper and long trousers with long red caps with turbans to match while the young ones go in Kaftans, long sleeve shirts, long trousers with embroidery and ‘Zanna’ caps. The women simply wear long wrappers, blouses, hijabs {and sometimes even niqab} and another big wrapper to cover up in an Islamic fashion. According to history, Katagum was founded in 1830 by the family of Mallam Lawal who was the father of the first and second Emirs of Katagum; Mallam Bunni who was the senior brother of Mallam Zaki who history said was the first person to settle in Katagum town after his father, Mallam Lawan had died at Yayu village near Chinade. Another version of the history said that Mallam Lawan first settled at Nafada in Gombe Emirate and later moved down to Yayu where he gave birth to a son who was later to be known famously as Zaki. After the death of his father, Mallam Lawan went to Sokoto to meet the then famous Islamic cleric, Shehu Usman Dan Fodio to receive a flag of office in 1814 and remained there until 1809AD when he graduated from the Islamic school of Usman Dan Fodio. He later moved to a village called Tashena, which is about nine kilometers from the present Katagum. He reigned as the Emir between 1807 and 1814. After his death, he was succeeded by his brother, Suleiman Adandaya who reigned from 1814 to 1816. According to history, the third Emir of Katagum was Mallam Dankauwa who was regarded as a very powerful man. He had about 4000 horsemen and 20000 foot soldiers with whom he fought many wars and he reigned between 1816 and 1846. It was during his period that the Fulani herdsmen migrated into the Emirate from different parts of the Northern region.

Coming after him was Mallam AbdurRahman who was on the throne between 1846 and 1851 and when he joined his ancestors, he was equally succeeded by Mallam AbdulKadir who reigned from 1851 to 1868. Emirate horsemen When Abdulkadir died in 1868, he was succeeded by Muhammad Hajiji who was on the throne between 1868 and 1896. Other emirs who followed were: Abdulkadir (1896-1905), Muhammadu (1947).One unique thing that happened during the reign of Alhaji Muhammed was that it was then that the first car ever was seen in Azare town which was then the headquarters of Katagum Emirate after it was removed from Katagum in 1910 by the ninth Emir, Mallam AbdulKadir for administrative convenience. Between 1947 and 1980, Katagum Emirate was ruled by Umar Faruq and was succeeded by Mallam Abubakar. The present emir, Alhaji Muhammadu Kabir Umar was installed in 1980. The Emirate has historical sites, which have been attracting tourists such as Shira hills and paintings made by the early settlers in the area; the tomb of Mallam Lawan the father of Mallam Zaki the founder of Katagum which is sited at Yayu in Chinade district; the defence walls at Katagum village as well the tomb of Mallam Zaki which is situated outside the defence walls of Katagum. Muhammadu Kabir Umar, the 11th Emir of Katagum was born in 1934 and received his education at the Bauchi Middle School between 1948 and 1949 after which he went to the then Clerical Training College now Ahmadu Bello University (ABU), Zaria where he studied local government administration between 1950 and 1951. He later proceeded to UK for another course in local government administration. He also attended many courses and seminars within and outside Nigeria all in local government administration. Before his selection as the Emir, he had held various offices as Native Authority scribe at the Central Office in Azare in 1949 and then appointed as the District Head of Sakwa between 1952 and 1957 then he became the District head of Katagum in 1955 and in 1966 he was the NA Councilor for Natural Resources and from there he was moved to Shira as the District Head. He was also Minister of State, Premier's Office, Kaduna( 1957 - 1960), Minister of Internal Affairs, Northern Nigeria (1960-1966); he had earlier been elected into the Northern House of Assembly (1952-1966) during when he was appointed parliamentary secretary, Ministry of Land and Survey in 1957. Between 1976 and 1978 he was the chairman of Bauchi State Housing Corporation. In the same year, he was appointed chairman of Bauchi State Development Board, chairman, Board of the Governing Council of College of Islamic Legal Studies, Misau (1986–2001). He was also at different times, the Pro-Chancellor, Provisional Council of Federal University of Technology, Yola; Chancellor, University of Agriculture, Abeokuta and Chancellor, University of Calabar from 1986 to 2017.

Alhaji (Dr.) Muhammad Kabeer Umar died on 9 December 2017. He was very loved by Katagumites. He ruled for 37 years. His funeral prayer was led by the emir of Kano, Sunusi Lamido Sunusi with a very huge mass of people in attendance. The prayer was offered at the Emir's palace in Azare, the headquarter of the local government.

The late Emir was succeeded by his eldest son, Alhaji Umar Kabir Umar, formally, Umar Farouq II as the 12th Emir of Katagum.

== Madakin Katagum ==
The Madakin Katagum is Alhaji Abdullahi Babani. He became the madaki in 2016, after the passing of his father Alhaji Abdulqadir Babani.
