= Zaki, Nigeria =

Zaki
- LGA
- Interactive map of Zaki
- Location in Nigeria
- Coordinates: 12°08′N 10°17′E
- Country: Nigeria
- State: Bauchi State
- Headquarters: Katagum

Government
  - Member of Federal House of Representatives: Muhammed Dan Abba Shehu
  - Local Government Chairman: Yusuf Babayo Zaki

Area
  - Total: 1,436 km^{2} (554 sq mi)

Population (2022)
  - Total: 338,700
  - Density: 235.9/km^{2} (610.9/sq mi)
- Time zone: UTC+1 (WAT)
- 3-digit postal code prefix: 752
- ISO 3166 code: NG.BA.ZA

Zaki is a Local Government Area of Bauchi State, Nigeria. Its headquarters are in the town of Katagum.

It has an area of 1,436 km^{2} and a population of 191,457 at the 2006 census.

The postal code of the area is 752.

The predominant ethnic group in the area are Fulani. the Hausa, Kanuri and Karai-Karai in the east of the area.

The Bade language is spoken in Zaki LGA.

== Climate ==
The temperature varies between the wet season, which is warm and unpleasant, and the dry season, which is hot, humid, and partially cloudy.

The annual temperature trend in Kafin Zaki is rising due to climate change; warming stripes show the average annual temperature.
