= Kirfi =

- LGA
- Interactive map of Kirfi
- Location in Nigeria
- Coordinates: 10°24′N 10°24′E
- Country: Nigeria
- State: Bauchi State
- Headquarters: Kirfin Kasa

Area
  - Total: 2,371 km^{2} (915 sq mi)

Population (2006 census)
  - Total: 147,618
  - Density: 62.26/km^{2} (161.3/sq mi)
- Time zone: UTC+1 (WAT)
- 3-digit postal code prefix: 743
- ISO 3166 code: NG.BA.KI

Kirfi is a Local Government Area of Bauchi State, Nigeria, bordering Gombe State in the east. Its headquarters are in the town of Kirfi (Kirfin Kasa). The northeasterly line of equal latitude and longitude passes through the Local Government Area.

It has an area of 2,371 km^{2} (915 sq mi) and a population of 147,618 at the 2006 census.

The predominant ethnic group in the area is the Hausa. While Kirfanci is spoken in few towns as it is facing existential threat due to the asoption of Hausa as a lingua franca in the north. The Bure language is also spoken in the Local Government Area.

The postal code of the area is 743.

The administrative center of Kirfi Local Government Area is situated in kirfin kasa. The local government comprises several districts, including Kirfi, Kirfi Badara, Bara, Beni 1 & 2, Dewu Central, Dewu East, and Wanka.

== Climate ==
The temperature typically varies throughout the year between the wet season, which is hot and oppressive, and the dry season, which is hot and partially cloudy.

=== Average Temperature ===
The warm period spans 2.4 months, from 26 February to 7 May, with a daily high temperature averaging above 37 °C (98 °F). April stands out as Kirfi's hottest month, with an average high of 38 °C (101 °F) and a low of 24 °C (76 °F).

Conversely, the cooler season extends over 2.7 months, from 12 July to 2 October, featuring a daily high temperature averaging below 31 °C (88 °F). January marks the coldest month in Kirfi, with an average low of 16 °C (60 °F) and a high of 33 °C (92 °F).
