= Giade =

- LGA and town
- Interactive map of Giade
- Country: Nigeria
- State: Bauchi State

Government
  - Local Government Chairman: Usman Muhammad Sale

Area
  - Total: 668 km^{2} (258 sq mi)

Population (2006)
  - Total: 156,969
  - Density: 235/km^{2} (609/sq mi)
- Time zone: UTC+1 (WAT)
- 3-digit postal code prefix: 750

Giade is a town and Local Government Area of Bauchi State, Nigeria. It become a local government in 1996. Dominated mainly by the Fulani tribe. Hausa and Fulfulde are the most spoken languages.

It has an area of 668 km^{2} and a population of 156,969 at the 2006 census. The postal code of the area is 750.

== Climate ==
Giade's wet season is humid, mainly gloomy, and has year-round highs and lows of 13 to 39.4 degrees Celsius or 56 to 103 degrees Fahrenheit.

Climate change is causing a temperature trend of warmer and colder temperatures.
