= Dass, Nigeria =

Dass
- LGA and town
- Interactive map of Dass
- Country: Nigeria
- State: Bauchi State

Government
  - Local Government Chairman: Muhammad Abubakar Jibo

Area
  - Total: 535 km^{2} (207 sq mi)
- Elevation: 700 m (2,300 ft)

Population (2006)
  - Total: 89,943
  - Density: 168/km^{2} (435/sq mi)
- Time zone: UTC+1 (WAT)
- Postal code: 740

Dass is a local government area of Bauchi State, Nigeria. Its headquarters are in the town of Dass.

It has an area of 535 km^{2} and a population of 89,943 at the 2006 census.

The postal code of the area is 740.

== History ==
People began to settle in Dass as far back as the period before the jihad of Danfodiyo around the foot and on the Mbula hill. Most of the early settlers came in search of security, which they hid in caves and on the hilltop to avoid attack by their enemies. Later in the early part of the 19th century during the jihad of Shehu Danfodio, Jarawa people migrated to the area in search of security and respite. By the middle of the century they had settled at the foot of Mbula hill. The area began its administrative role a year before the amalgamation of Nigeria, when the colonial masters gave the area a third class chiefdom in 1913. It was given to the leader of the Jarawa known as Dukkurma who united the groups and ruled up to 1927. After his death, his son, Usman Maleka, who was educated in Bauchi elementary school, by the British colonial masters, succeeded his father the same year. During the reign of Usman Maleka the area demonstrated rapid growth and development which is the by-product of valued leadership and promotion of peace throughout the diverse ethnic and cultural backgrounds of the people. Similarly during his reign the community was considered by the committee on local government creation in which in 1976 the area was given local government area with full administrative function, at the same time with the birth of the then Bauchi state (i.e.) 1976. A year later in 1977, with the death of Alh. Usman Maleka, his son, Alh. Bilyaminu Othman succeeded him. He consolodited on his father's developments, and promoted the chiefdom to 2nd class and 1st Class Emirate in 1983 and 1997 respectively. He reigned for 32 years. Alhajji Bilywminu died in September, 2019, and was succeeded by his eldest son, Alh Usman Bilyaminu Othman II, in the same year.

== Education ==
Both western and Islamic educational systems have reached the community since before the amalgation of the country in 1914. The first school established in the community is the then Central primary school Dass, now Wazir Mazadu primary school. From one primary school at the early 20th century to more than 100 schools including 25 secondary schools, State College of Education and a functional private tertiary health institutions.

The Islamiyya school was predated by the almajiri system in the community. However, despite the adoption of the western system of education, the almajiri schools system that is mainly set for Quranic education still exist. Moreover, Islamiya school system was adopted in almost all the local communities in Dass. The community has more than 100 Islamiyya schools pioneered by Usman Maleka Memorial Islamiyya.

The community has produced several university dons of which some have reached the rank of professors and host of PhDs. The Dass local education authority has more than 30 first degree holders and more than 700 NCE holders.

== Relief and landforms ==
Dass is located on the North Central Highland of Nigeria with average of 700 metres (2,300 feet) above sea level, with undulating surfaces seen everywhere in the area. There are hills and ridges with big boulders them, all over the area. Some of these ridges extend up to the neighbouring local governments particularly Toro local government. All the rocks particularly hill are of plutonic origin formed from tectonic activity solidified underneath and later exposed by denudation where hard-rocks standout as mountains. There are plains that surround these standout-rocks in the area which is the area where most of the settlements are; moreover they are the product of deposition from the ridges and mountains. Dass being is located on hilly environment there are some seasonal falls around the hill which are the product of relief of the area.

== Climate ==
The town is characterised by two distinct climatic seasons, dry and wet seasons. It is located within the Guinea savannah type of climate with 6–7 months of rainfall, usually starting from April and 5-6 month dry season from November to March every year respectively. The town records more than 1,000 millimetres (39 inches) annually. The rainfall in the area originates from the Atlantic maritime air masses, occurring on the leeward side of North Central Highland of Jos plateau. The two air masses that cover Nigeria which the study area is part, come into contact at inter tropical discontinuity (ITD) which resulted into occurrence of the rainfall in the area. The cold dry wind of continental origin forms part of the dusty harmattan wind that is experienced from December to February and in some instances up to march as it does in most part of northern Nigeria. The temperature in the area is relatively high with mean annual temperature of 30 °C.

== Soil and vegetation ==
There are different type of soil and soil profile in Dass because the area is occupied by ridges and hills. Therefore, soils around and on the hills are azonal soils, that are immature having several layers with different structures that are said to have result from recent deposition of sediments examples are alluvial soil and peat. Although soils like laterites are typical example of Zonal soil found in the area. The vegetation of the area of the study area is the Guinea Savannah type, receiving rainfall for over six month the vegetation is mostly green for the larger part of the year showing fresh leaves and tall grasses. During the dry season the area looks patchy and dry with tree shedding their leaves to conserve water. This region has abundant grasses with average height of 1.5m; trees have umbrella shape because they lack competition for sunlight. They (trees) developed resistant to dry season and bush burning during dry season with their thick bark. Most prominent trees in the area are locust-bean ashiwali, tamarind, acacia, baobab and economic trees (e.g. mango) and host of shrubs and herbs.

== Geology ==
Dass is located on the basement complex rocks of North Central Highland. It is characterised by plutonic rocks that solidified at some depth within the Earth's crust, solidification of the rock was slowly made thereby, forming large crystals of rock or coarse grain. The granite, gabbros, migmatite, gneisses and diorite that are seen on the surface in the study area now are exposed to the surface by denudational activities and erosion. The Plutonic rocks in the area contain mostly acid rocks with the presence of silicate and aluminium, which most times make it lighter in colour. It contains mostly quartz and some fraction of mica. The geology of the area shows that the area is a basement complex with shallow water table at average depth of 7.41 metres (24.3 feet) (Nyanganji et al., 2011). The basement complex of the underlying rocks is highly pervious and permeable due to penetrating cracks, fault and fissures which allow water to percolate easily and fast into the rock mass. The rocks belong to Precambrian to early Palaeozoic era. The following minerals are found in the area; tin, quartz, feldspar, aquarium, zinc, iron, manganese and kaolin.
