= Shira, Nigeria =

- LGA and town
- Nickname: badali
- Motto: badali takuna ramin kura daga ke sai yayanki
- Interactive map of Shira, Nigeria
- Location within Nigeria Location within Africa
- Coordinates: 10°36′N 10°00′E
- Country: Nigeria
- State: Bauchi State
- Headquarters: Yana

Government
  - Local Government Chairman: Abdullahi Ibrahim Beli

Area
  - Total: 1,321 km^{2} (510 sq mi)

Population (2006)
  - Total: 234,014
  - Density: 177.1/km^{2} (458.8/sq mi)
- Time zone: UTC+1 (WAT)
- 3-digit postal code prefix: 750

Shira. is a Local Government Area of Bauchi State, Nigeria. Its headquarters is in the town of Yana.

It has an area of 1,321 km^{2} and a population of 234,014 at the 2006 census.

The postal code of the area is 750.

== Climate ==
Shira's climate is getting colder, with a positive trend of rising temperatures and a horizontal trend of falling temperatures.
