= Bogoro =

Bogoro Zaar (Sayawa)
- LGA and town
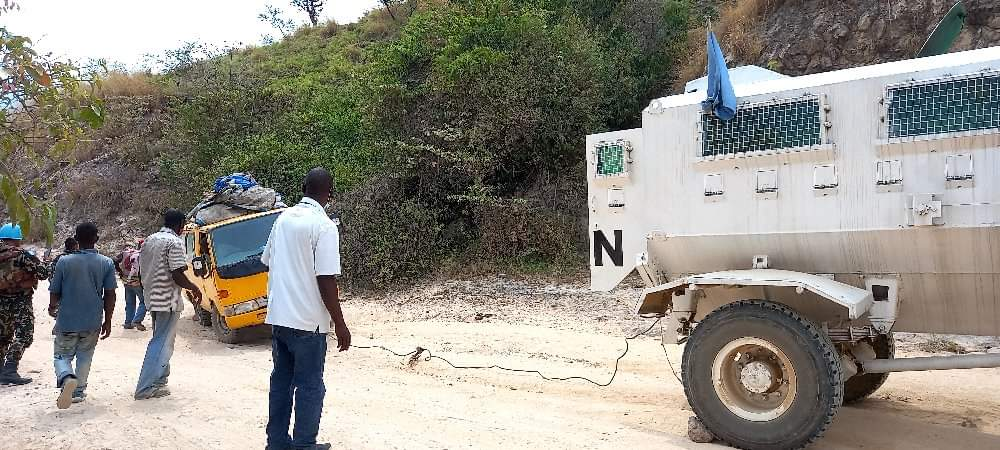
- MONUSCO vehicle towing out a local bus in 2022
- Motto: Sohrgha Nanbong Yi Tuhd Lihbah? (Can a stick of broom sweep a place?)
- Interactive map of Bogoro
- Country: Nigeria
- State: Bauchi State

Government
  - Local Government Chairman: Lawi Yakubu Sumi

Area
  - Total: 834.5 km^{2} (322.2 sq mi)

Population (2022)
  - Total: 149,700
  - Density: 179.4/km^{2} (464.6/sq mi)
- Time zone: UTC+1 (WAT)
- 3-digit postal code prefix: 741

Bogoro is a Local Government Area of Bauchi State, Nigeria. Its headquarters are in the town of Bogoro. Za’ar or Sayawa people are the majority of its inhabitants.

It has an area of 834.5 km^{2} (322.2 sq mi) and a population of 84,215 at the 2006 census. The postal code of the area is 741.

== Climatic Condition ==
During the wet season, the temperature rarely falls below 54 °F or rises over 102 °F, whereas the dry season is partly cloudy and hot all year.

== Notable people ==
- Rt. Hon. Yakubu Dogara (Speaker Nigerian House of Representatives) (2015 - 2019)
- Suleiman Elias Bogoro (Executive Secretary of Tertiary Education Trust Fund) (2014 - 2016) (2019-Date)
- Jude Rabo, vice-chancellor of Federal University, Wukari
