= Itas/Gadau =

- LGA and town
- Interactive map of Itas/Gadau
- Location in Nigeria
- Coordinates: 11°52′N 9°58′E
- Country: Nigeria
- State: Bauchi State
- Headquarters: Itas

Government
  - Local Government Chairman: Hajawa Jibrin Gidado

Area
  - Total: 1,398 km^{2} (540 sq mi)

Population (2006 census)
  - Total: 229,996
  - Density: 164.5/km^{2} (426.1/sq mi)
- Time zone: UTC+1 (WAT)
- 3-digit postal code prefix: 751
- ISO 3166 code: NG.BA.IG

Itas/Gadau is a Local Government Area of Bauchi State, Nigeria. Its headquarters are in the town of Itas. The town of Gadau is in the east of the area at 11°50′08″N 10°10′02″E.

It has an area of 1,398 km^{2} and a population of 229,996 at the 2006 census.

The predominant ethnic groups in the area are the Hausa and Fulani in common with the other divisions of the state.

The postal code of the area is 751.

The main campus of Bauchi State University is located in Gadau.

== Schools ==
In Itas Gadau LGA, it has a system of schools and education which include the higher institution and some other primary and secondary schools established by the Bauchi State Government education system.

- Bauchi state University (Gadau)
- Government primary school Itas Gadau

== Climate ==
In Itas, the dry season is oppressively hot and partially cloudy, while the wet season is oppressively hot and predominantly cloudy. The average annual temperature ranges from 13 to 40 degrees Celsius or 56 to 104 degrees Fahrenheit, rarely falling below 10 °C (50 °F) or rising over 42 °C (108 °F).
