= Darazo =

- LGA and town
- Interactive map of Darazo
- Coordinates: 11.00°N 10.41°E
- Country: Nigeria
- State: Bauchi State

Government
  - Local Government Chairman: Sama'ila Ya'u Sade

Area
  - Total: 3,015 km^{2} (1,164 sq mi)

Population (2006)
  - Total: 251,597
  - Density: 83.45/km^{2} (216.1/sq mi)
- Time zone: UTC+1 (WAT)
- Postal code: 750

Darazo is a Local Government Area of Bauchi State, Nigeria, Its headquarters are in the town of Darazo. Darazo is mainly dominated by Fulani , Hausawa Karai-karai people.

It has an area of 3,015 km^{2} and a population of 251,597 at the 2006 census.

The postal code of the area is 750.

The Zumbun language is spoken in Jimbim settlement in Darazo LGA.

== Darazo Satellite Prison ==
The Darazo Satellite Prison is a satellite prison, one of several in the country. The prison reopened on August 15, 2016, one of eight satellite prisons to reopen after being closed due to the Boko Haram insurgency. Inmates from overcrowded main prisons are being transferred to these reopened facilities. Two other satellite prisons remain closed until they meet the necessary conditions to accommodate prisoners.

== Climate ==
The average annual temperature ranges from 13 °C (55 °F) to 39 °C (102 °F), with the wet season being humid and largely cloudy, and the dry season being partly cloudy and less humid.
