= Gamawa =

- LGA and town
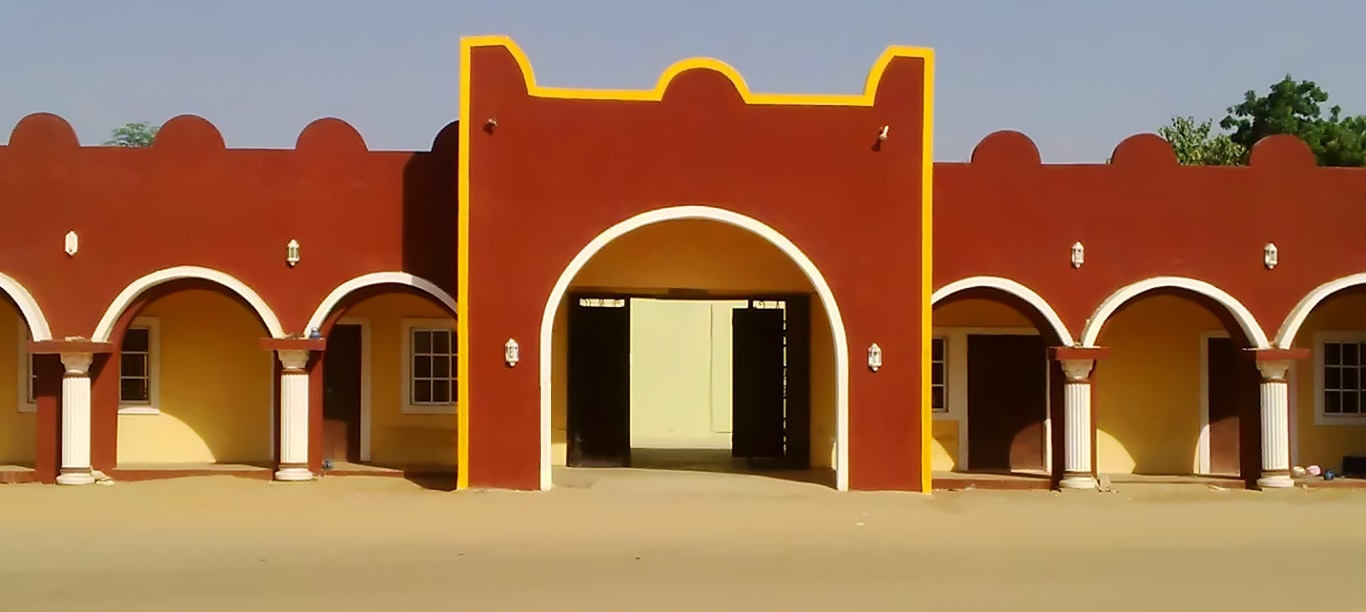
- Gamawa Emir's Palace
- Interactive map of Gamawa
- Location in Nigeria
- Coordinates: 12°08′N 10°32′E
- Country: Nigeria
- State: Bauchi State

Government
  - Local Government Chairman: Madaki Ahmed Gololo

Area
  - Total: 2,925 km^{2} (1,129 sq mi)

Population (2006 census)
  - Total: 286,388
  - Density: 97.91/km^{2} (253.6/sq mi)
- Time zone: UTC+1 (WAT)
- 3-digit postal code prefix: 752
- ISO 3166 code: NG.BA.GM

Gamawa is a Local Government Area of Bauchi State, Nigeria, bordering Yobe State in the east and Dambam in the south. Its headquarters are in the town of Gamawa.

It has an area of 2,925 km^{2} and a population of 286,388 at the 2006 census.

The predominant ethnic group in the area are the Fulani and the Karai-Karai living in the east.

The postal code of the area is 752.

== Climate ==
The rainy season in Gamawa is typically hot, humid, and generally cloudy, whereas the dry season is hot and partly cloudy.
