= 2023 Nigerian Senate elections in Bauchi State =

2023 Senate elections in Bauchi

- 25 February 2023

All 3 Bauchi State seats in the Senate of Nigeria
	Majority party	Minority party	Third party
Party	New Nigeria Peoples Party	PDP	APC
Last election	0	0	3
Seats before	2	1	0
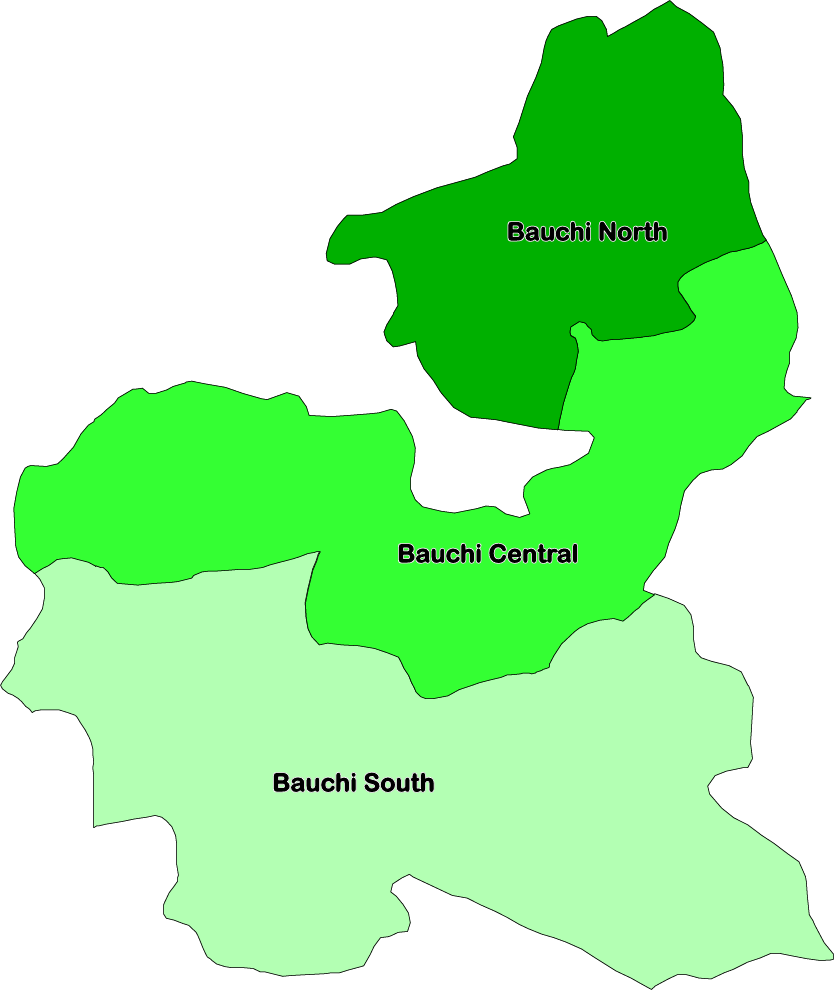
- NNPP incumbent retiring NNPP incumbent running for re-election PDP incumbent retiring or lost renomination

The 2023 Nigerian Senate elections in Bauchi State will be held on 25 February 2023, to elect the 3 federal Senators from Bauchi State, one from each of the state's three senatorial districts. The elections will coincide with the 2023 presidential election, as well as other elections to the Senate and elections to the House of Representatives; with state elections being held two weeks later. Primaries were held between 4 April and 9 June 2022.

== Background ==
In the previous Senate elections, only one of the three incumbent senators were returned, with South District Senator Lawal Yahaya Gumau (APC) being re-elected while both APC-turned-PDP senators (Central District's Isah Misau and the North District's Sulaiman Mohammed Nazif) were defeated in their re-election bids. In the South district, Gumau held his seat for the PDP with 52% of the vote while Halliru Dauda Jika (APC) unseated Misau with 50% of the vote in the North district; in the Central seat, Nazif was pushed to third place in a race won by Adamu Muhammad Bulkachuwa (APC). These results were a part of a good 2019 showing for the APC in Bauchi elections as Buhari won the state and the party retained control of the House of Assembly while the House of Representatives seats split between the APC and PDP. On the other hand, former minister Bala Mohammed—the PDP gubernatorial nominee—unseated APC incumbent Mohammed Abdullahi Abubakar by a narrow margin.

In the first half of the 2019–2023 term, the three senators were noted for their remarkably low output as Jika and Gumau sponsored no motions or petitions while Bulkachuwa only sponsored two motions—both in memoriam speeches. The three senators also had few bills as Gumau and Bulkachuwa had a single bill in over two years while Jika only had two. In 2022, Jika and Gumau defected to the NNPP while Bulkachuwa moved to the PDP.

== Overview ==
Affiliation	Party			Total
Affiliation	NNPP	PDP	APC	Total
Previous Election	0	0	3	3
Before Election	2	1	0	3
After Election	0	2	1	3

== Summary ==
District	Incumbent		Results	
District	Incumbent	Party	Status	Candidates
Bauchi Central	Halliru Dauda Jika	NNPP (Note: This House member was elected as a member of the APC but switched to the NNPP during their term.)	Incumbent retired New member elected PDP gain	▌Uba Ahmed Nana (APC); ▌ ✓ Abdul Ahmed Ningi (PDP)
Bauchi North	Adamu Muhammad Bulkachuwa	PDP (Note: This senator was elected as a member of the APC but switched to the PDP during their term.)	Incumbent lost renomination (Note: Senator defection); New member elected PDP hold	▌Siraj Ibrahim Tanko Muhammad (APC); ▌ ✓ Sama'ila Dahuwa (PDP)
Bauchi South	Lawal Yahaya Gumau	NNPP	Incumbent lost renomination Incumbent lost re-election under nomination of new party New member elected APC gain	▌ ✓ Shehu Buba Umar (APC); ▌Lawal Yahaya Gumau (NNPP); ▌Dahiru Garba (PDP)

== Bauchi Central ==
2023 Bauchi Central Senatorial District election
- 25 February 2023
Nominee	Uba Ahmed Nana	Abdul Ahmed Ningi
Party	APC	PDP
Senator before election
Halliru Dauda Jika
New Nigeria Peoples Party
Elected Senator
To be determined
To be determined

The Bauchi Central Senatorial District covers the local government areas of Damban, Darazo, Ganjuwa, Misau, Ningi, and Warji. The incumbent is Halliru Dauda Jika (NNPP), who was elected with 49.8% of the vote in 2019 as a member of the APC. In early 2022, Jika decided to run for governor of Bauchi State, instead of seeking re-election; however, he lost the APC primary and promptly defected to the NNPP in June 2022 to become its gubernatorial nominee.

=== Primary elections ===
==== All Progressives Congress ====
On 20 April 2022, the APC National Executive Committee announced the party's schedule for senatorial primaries, setting its expression of interest form price at ₦3 million and nomination form price at ₦17 million with a 50% discount for candidates younger than 40 while women and candidates with disabilities get free nomination forms. Forms were to be sold from 26 April to 6 May until the deadline was later extended to 10 May then 12 May. After the submission of nomination forms by 13 May, candidates were screened by a party committee on 14 and 15 May while 18 May was the date for the screening appeal process. Ward congresses and LGA congresses were set for 16 and 17 May to elect delegates for the primary. Candidates approved by the screening process advanced to a primary set for 27 May, in concurrence with other APC senatorial primaries; challenges to the result could be made on 28 May.

The primary resulted in Uba Ahmed Nana emerging as the nominee after results showed him defeating former Senator Isah Hamma Misau by a 49% margin.

APC primary results
Party	Candidate	Votes	%
APC	Uba Ahmed Nana	238	71.90%
APC	Isah Hamma Misau	75	22.66%
APC	Abubakar Shehu	18	5.44%
Total votes		331	100.00%

==== People's Democratic Party ====
On 16 March 2022, the national PDP announced its senatorial primary timetable, setting its expression of interest form price at ₦1 million and the nomination form price at ₦20 million with a 50% discount for candidates between 25 and 30. Forms were to be sold until 1 April but the party later extended the deadline four times before reaching a final deadline of 22 April. After the submission of nomination forms by 25 April, candidates were screened by a party committee on 27 April while 2 May was the rescheduled date for the screening appeal process. Ward congresses were set for 29 April and LGA congresses were rescheduled for 10 May to elect delegates for the primary. Candidates approved by the screening process advanced to a primary set for 23 May, in concurrence with other PDP senatorial primaries but due to often violently enforced Monday stay-at-home orders by separatists, southeastern state parties held their primaries on 24 May; challenges to the result could be made on 25 May.

On the primary date, former Senator Abdul Ahmed Ningi was the only candidate and thus was nominated unopposed.

=== Campaign ===
In December 2022, analysis from The Nation categorized Ningi as the frontrunner due to his political clout and the relatively low name recognition of Nana.

=== General election ===
==== Results ====
2023 Bauchi Central Senatorial District election
Party	Candidate	Votes	%
ADP	Ibrahim Liman Musa		
APP	Adamu Haruna		
AAC	Misbahu Nuhu		
ADC	Muhammad Kawu		
APC	Uba Ahmed Nana	84,621	
LP	Salisu Jibrin Sambo		
New Nigeria Peoples Party	Isah Hamma Misau		
PRP	Kala Ibrahim		
PDP	Abdul Ahmed Ningi	104,878	
SDP	Zidanga Saleh Adamu		
ZLP	Mahmood Mohammed		
Total votes			100.00%
Invalid or blank votes			N/A
Turnout			

== Bauchi North ==
2023 Bauchi North Senatorial District election
- 25 February 2023
Nominee	Siraj Ibrahim Tanko Muhammad	Sama'ila Dahuwa
Party	APC	PDP
Senator before election
Adamu Muhammad Bulkachuwa
APC
Elected Senator
To be determined
To be determined

The Bauchi North district covers the local government areas of Gamawa, Giade, Itas/Gadau, Jamaare, Katagum, Shira, and Zaki. The incumbent Adamu Muhammad Bulkachuwa (APC), who was elected with 39.7% of the vote in 2019, sought re-election but lost APC renomination. In November 2022, Bulkachuwa decamped to the PDP.

=== Primary elections ===
==== All Progressives Congress ====
On 20 April 2022, the APC National Executive Committee announced the party's schedule for senatorial primaries, setting its expression of interest form price at ₦3 million and nomination form price at ₦17 million with a 50% discount for candidates younger than 40 while women and candidates with disabilities get free nomination forms. Forms were to be sold from 26 April to 6 May until the deadline was later extended to 10 May then 12 May. After the submission of nomination forms by 13 May, candidates were screened by a party committee on 14 and 15 May while 18 May was the date for the screening appeal process. Ward congresses and LGA congresses were set for 16 and 17 May to elect delegates for the primary. Candidates approved by the screening process advanced to a primary set for 27 May, in concurrence with other APC senatorial primaries; challenges to the result could be made on 28 May.

The primary resulted in Siraj Ibrahim Tanko Muhammad—son of then-Supreme Court Chief Justice Ibrahim Tanko Muhammad—defeating Ibrahim Baba for the nomination after results showed a 3% margin of victory; Bulkachuwa came last without any votes. The win was controversial due to allegations that Muhammad used his father's position to steal public funds used to bribe delegates with cars, cash, and jobs in the judiciary. These allegations purportedly led to Ibrahim Tanko Muhammad's resignation as Chief Justice in July 2022 amid other scandals as well. The nomination itself was categorized as another example of the formation of political family dynasties as Muhammad was one of many political family scions to win primaries.

APC primary results
Party	Candidate	Votes	%
APC	Siraj Ibrahim Tanko Muhammad	189	51.36%
APC	Ibrahim Baba	178	48.37%
APC	Audu Sule	1	0.27%
APC	Adamu Muhammad Bulkachuwa	0	0.00%
Total votes		368	100.00%
Invalid or blank votes		2	N/A
Turnout		370	Unknown

==== People's Democratic Party ====
On 16 March 2022, the national PDP announced its senatorial primary timetable, setting its expression of interest form price at ₦1 million and the nomination form price at ₦20 million with a 50% discount for candidates between 25 and 30. Forms were to be sold until 1 April but the party later extended the deadline four times before reaching a final deadline of 22 April. After the submission of nomination forms by 25 April, candidates were screened by a party committee on 27 April while 2 May was the rescheduled date for the screening appeal process. Ward congresses were set for 29 April and LGA congresses were rescheduled for 10 May to elect delegates for the primary. Candidates approved by the screening process advanced to a primary set for 23 May, in concurrence with other PDP senatorial primaries but due to often violently enforced Monday stay-at-home orders by separatists, southeastern state parties held their primaries on 24 May; challenges to the result could be made on 25 May.

The Azare-held primary resulted in victory for Sama’ila Dahuwa—former Commissioner of Health in the Bala Mohammed administration. Dahuwa beat chemist Laraba Gambo Abdullahi by a 27% margin of victory. In his acceptance speech, Dahuwa praised his former opponents and asked for their support going forward.

PDP primary results
Party	Candidate	Votes	%
PDP	Sama’ila Dahuwa	133	58.59%
PDP	Laraba Gambo Abdullahi	71	31.28%
PDP	Maula Adamu Aliyu	16	7.05%
PDP	Aminu Ahmed Yapeko	7	3.08%
Total votes		227	100.00%

=== General election ===
==== Results ====
2023 Bauchi North Senatorial District election
Party	Candidate	Votes	%
A	Sani Abdulmumini		
ADP	Mohammed Sani Ibrahim		
APP	Usman Daladi		
APC	Siraj Ibrahim Tanko Muhammad	100,246	
NRM	Ibrahim Ali		
New Nigeria Peoples Party	Ghazali Mohammed Mijinyawa		
PRP	Mohammed Daiyabu Mohammed		
PDP	Sama'ila Dahuwa	102,043	
SDP	Baba Ibrahim Mohammed		
Total votes			100.00%
Invalid or blank votes			N/A
Turnout			

== Bauchi South ==
2023 Bauchi South Senatorial District election
- 25 February 2023
Nominee	Shehu Buba Umar	Lawal Yahaya Gumau	Dahiru Garba
Party	APC	New Nigeria Peoples Party	PDP
Senator before election
Lawal Yahaya Gumau
New Nigeria Peoples Party
Elected Senator
To be determined
To be determined

The Bauchi South Senatorial District covers the local government areas of Alkaleri, Bauchi, Bogoro, Dass, Kirfi, Tafawa Balewa, and Toro. The incumbent is Lawal Yahaya Gumau (NNPP), who was elected with 51.9% of the vote in 2019 as a member of the APC. Gumau originally sought re-election in the APC but lost the primary before defecting to the NNPP in May 2022 and obtaining its senatorial nomination.

=== Primary elections ===
==== All Progressives Congress ====
On 20 April 2022, the APC National Executive Committee announced the party's schedule for senatorial primaries, setting its expression of interest form price at ₦3 million and nomination form price at ₦17 million with a 50% discount for candidates younger than 40 while women and candidates with disabilities get free nomination forms. Forms were to be sold from 26 April to 6 May until the deadline was later extended to 10 May then 12 May. After the submission of nomination forms by 13 May, candidates were screened by a party committee on 14 and 15 May while 18 May was the date for the screening appeal process. Ward congresses and LGA congresses were set for 16 and 17 May to elect delegates for the primary. Candidates approved by the screening process advanced to a primary set for 27 May, in concurrence with other APC senatorial primaries; challenges to the result could be made on 28 May.

The primary in Bauchi resulted in Shehu Buba Umar defeating Gumau for the nomination by just 6 votes. Gumau promptly left the APC to run as the NNPP nominee. The nomination of Umar was briefly annulled after a November court ruling, but the appeal ended with Umar's reinstatement as nominee.

APC primary results
Party	Candidate	Votes	%
APC	Shehu Buba Umar	188	50.27%
APC	Lawal Yahaya Gumau	182	48.66%
APC	Yusuf Ladan	4	1.07%
APC	Other candidates	0	0.00%
Total votes		374	100.00%
Invalid or blank votes		0	N/A
Turnout		374	Unknown

==== New Nigeria Peoples Party ====
The national NNPP announced its primary schedule on 12 April 2022, setting its expression of interest form price at ₦0.5 million and the nomination form price at ₦2.5 million with forms being sold from 10 April to 5 May. The rest of the timetable was revised on 19 May; after the purchase and submission of forms, senatorial candidates were screened by a party committee on 25 May while the screening appeal process was held on the next day. Ward congresses were set for 22 April to elect delegates for the primary. Candidates approved by the screening process advanced to a primary set for 28 May, in concurrence with all other NNPP gubernatorial primaries; challenges to the result could be made the next day.

Originally Yakubu Shehu Abdullahi—MHR for Bauchi—claimed to have been given an "automatic ticket" by party leadership as NNPP nominee, a few days after he defected from the APC in May 2022. However, the party promptly held a primary after Gumau joined and nominated him unanimously instead at a primary in Bauchi on 5 June. In response, Abdullahi labeled the primary as "a charade" and claimed to be "the authentic candidate of the NNPP."

NNPP primary results
Party	Candidate	Votes	%
New Nigeria Peoples Party	Lawal Yahaya Gumau	230	100.00%
New Nigeria Peoples Party	Yakubu Shehu Abdullahi	0	0.00%
Total votes		230	100.00%
Invalid or blank votes		1	N/A
Turnout		231	Unknown

==== People's Democratic Party ====
On 16 March 2022, the national PDP announced its senatorial primary timetable, setting its expression of interest form price at ₦1 million and the nomination form price at ₦20 million with a 50% discount for candidates between 25 and 30. Forms were to be sold until 1 April but the party later extended the deadline four times before reaching a final deadline of 22 April. After the submission of nomination forms by 25 April, candidates were screened by a party committee on 27 April while 2 May was the rescheduled date for the screening appeal process. Ward congresses were set for 29 April and LGA congresses were rescheduled for 10 May to elect delegates for the primary. Candidates approved by the screening process advanced to a primary set for 23 May, in concurrence with other PDP senatorial primaries but due to often violently enforced Monday stay-at-home orders by separatists, southeastern state parties held their primaries on 24 May; challenges to the result could be made on 25 May.

The primary resulted in victory for Dahiru Garba—former Commissioner of Commerce in the Bala Mohammed administration. Dahuwa beat Mahiru Maiwada by a single vote. After tabulation, Garba asked for the support of his former opponents. However, the ruling of a Federal High Court sitting in Owerri in mid-November 2022 annulled the primary and ordered the party to conduct a new exercise. In compliance with the ruling, a rerun primary was held on 30 November with Garba winning by a wide margin; however, most other aspirants were absent from the venue.

Annulled primary results

PDP primary results
Party	Candidate	Votes	%
PDP	Dahiru Garba	70	31.53%
PDP	Mahiru Maiwada	69	31.08%
PDP	Adamu Gumba	35	15.77%
PDP	Ladan Salihu	34	15.31%
PDP	Ahmed Shuaibu	14	6.31%
Total votes		222	100.00%

PDP rerun primary results
Party	Candidate	Votes	%
PDP	Dahiru Garba	211	96.79%
PDP	Mahiru Maiwada	7	3.21%
Total votes		218	100.00%
Invalid or blank votes		1	N/A
Turnout		219	94.40%

=== Campaign ===
In review of the campaign in December 2022, reporting from The Nation categorized Gumau as the frontrunner due to the relatively low name recognition of his opponents and the controversial PDP primary.

=== General election ===
==== Results ====
2023 Bauchi South Senatorial District election
Party	Candidate	Votes	%
AA	Bulus Akila Mbumma		
ADP	Yahaya Idris	1,059	
APP	Idris Hassan	951	
ADC	Naziru Dahiru Usman	1,020	
APC	Shehu Buba Umar	175,505	
APGA	Muhammed Chindo	1,075	
LP	Sani Ahmad	7,130	
NRM	Danladi Umar		
New Nigeria Peoples Party	Lawal Yahaya Gumau	53,739	
PRP	Idris Zakariyya		
PDP	Dahiru Garba	165,727	
SDP	Garba Muhammad Gidado		
ZLP	Khalifa Sani Abdullahi		
Total votes			100.00%
Invalid or blank votes			N/A
Turnout			

== See also ==
- 2023 Nigerian Senate election
- 2023 Nigerian elections
