= 2023 Bauchi State gubernatorial election =

2023 gubernatorial election in Bauchi State, Nigeria

- 18 March 2023
- Registered: 2,749,268
- Turnout: 38.50% (Note: This figure is based on the number of accredited voters (1,058,381); 1,049,600 voters (38.18%) cast votes (validly or invalidly) while 1,034,379 voters (37.62%) cast valid votes. Another turnout metric used by INEC is based on Permanent Voter Card-holding voters: either the percent of Permanent Voter Card-holding voters that were accredited to vote (38.89%) or the percent of Permanent Voter Card-holding voters that cast a vote—either validly or invalidly (38.56%); also used is the percent of Permanent Voter Card-holding voters that cast valid votes (38.00%).)
Nominee	Bala Mohammed	Sadique Abubakar	Halliru Dauda Jika
Party	PDP	APC	NNPP
Running mate	Muhammad Auwal Jatau	Shehu Aliyu Musa	Dahuwa Mohammed Gadauji
Popular vote	525,280	432,272	60,496
Percentage	50.78%	41.79%	5.85%
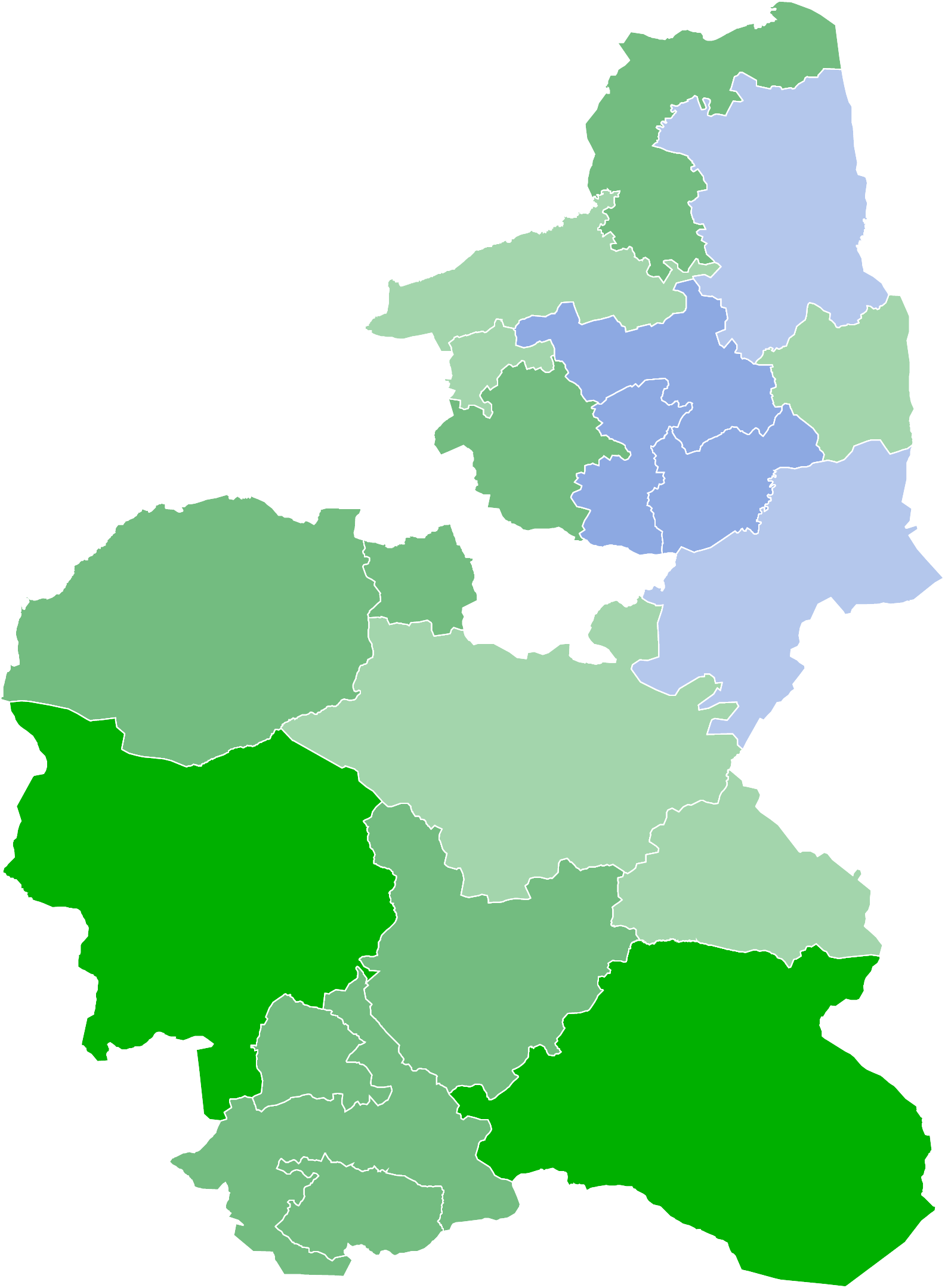
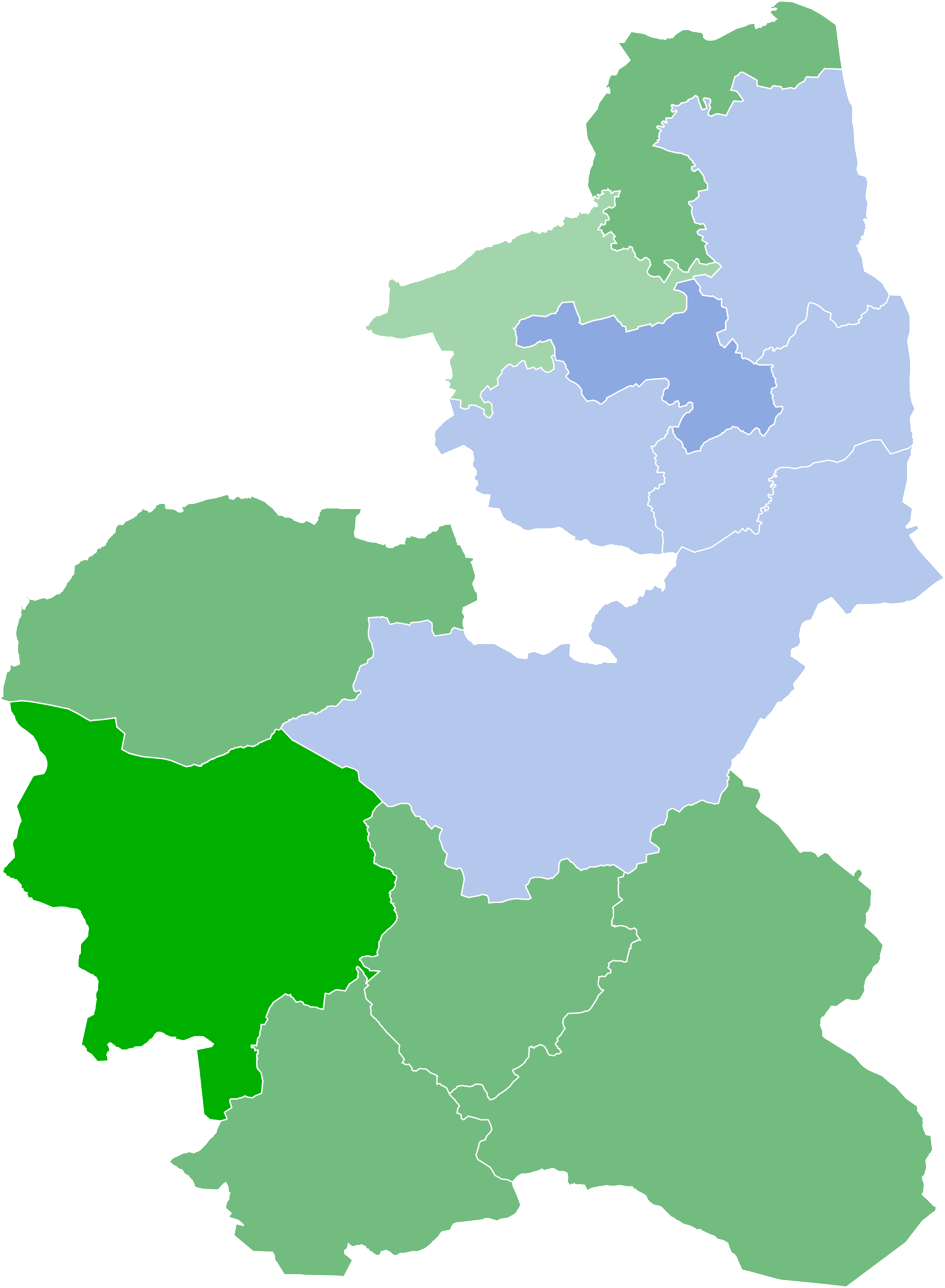
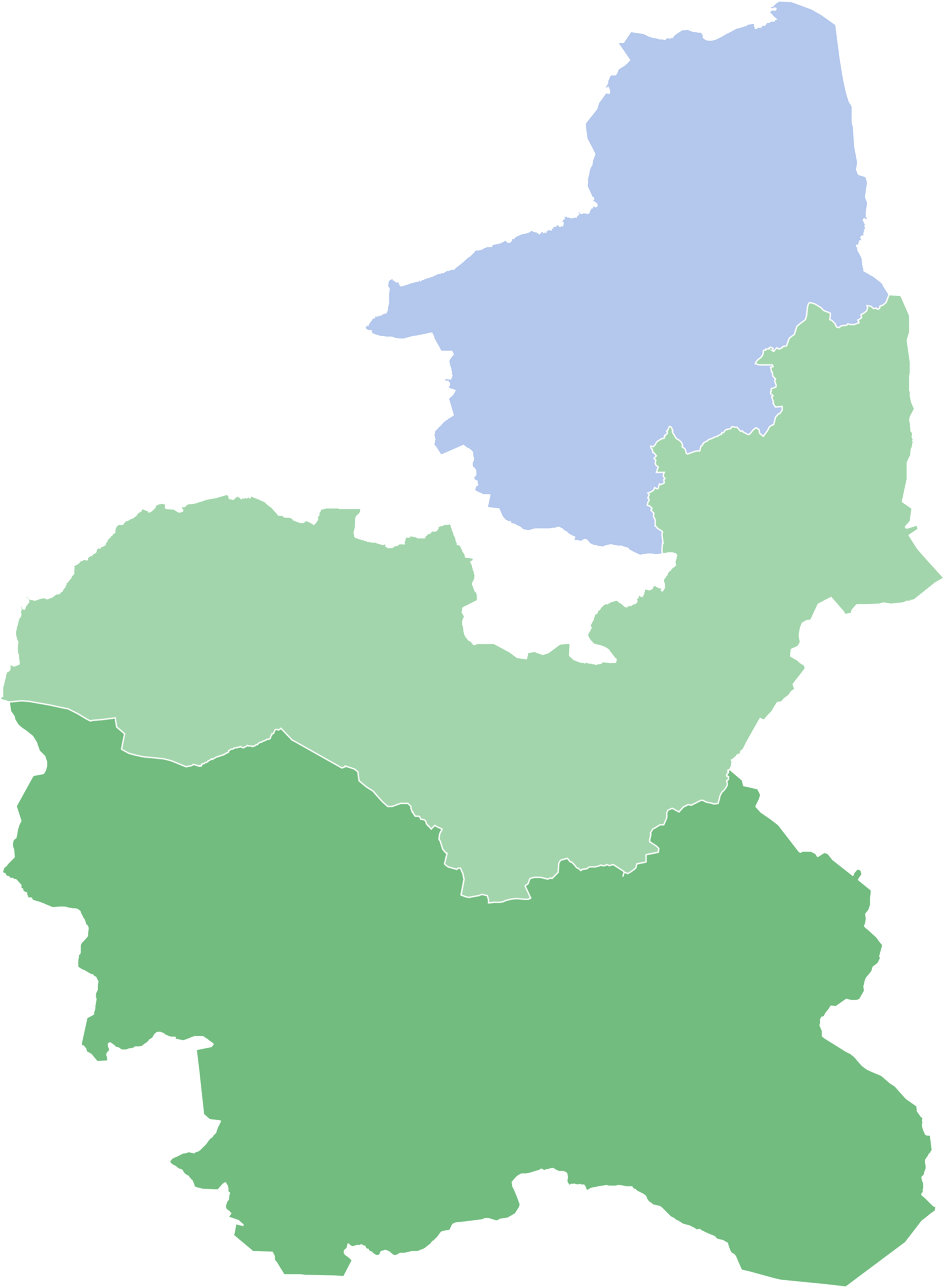
- LGA results Abubakar: 40–50% 50–60% Mohammed: 40–50% 50–60% 60–70%
Governor before election
Bala Mohammed
PDP
Elected Governor
Bala Mohammed
PDP

The 2023 Bauchi State gubernatorial election took place on 18 March 2023, to elect the Governor of Bauchi State, concurrent with elections to the Bauchi State House of Assembly as well as twenty-seven other gubernatorial elections and elections to all other state houses of assembly. The election—which was postponed from its original 11 March date—was held three weeks after the presidential election and National Assembly elections. Incumbent PDP Governor Bala Mohammed initially declined to run for re-election, instead running for president. However, after losing the PDP presidential primary in May 2022, Mohammed was renominated in a rerun primary. Mohammed was re-elected as governor by a 9% margin over first runner-up and APC nominee — former Chief of the Air Staff Sadique Abubakar.

Party primaries were scheduled for between 4 April and 9 June 2022 with the Peoples Democratic Party nominating former Secretary to the State Government Ibrahim Kashim on 25 May while the All Progressives Congress nominated Abubakar on 26 May. However, Kashim withdrew from the nomination on 30 May after Mohammed lost the PDP presidential primary; on 4 June, Mohammed won a rerun primary unopposed. On 4 August, Senator Halliru Dauda Jika — who came second in the APC primary — won the primary of the smaller New Nigeria Peoples Party after he defected from the APC two months prior.

On 20 March, collation completed and INEC Returning Officer Abdulkarim Sabo Mohammed declared Mohammed as the winner. Official results show Mohammed winning over 525,000 votes and 51% of the vote as runner-up Abubakar received around 432,000 votes and 42% of the vote while Jika came third with 60,000 votes and 6% of the vote. However, Abubakar rejected the results and alleged widespread fraud.

== Electoral system ==
The Governor of Bauchi State is elected using a modified two-round system. To be elected in the first round, a candidate must receive the plurality of the vote and over 25% of the vote in at least two-thirds of state local government areas. If no candidate passes this threshold, a second round will be held between the top candidate and the next candidate to have received a plurality of votes in the highest number of local government areas.

== Background ==
Bauchi State is a large, diverse northeastern state with a growing economy and vast natural areas but facing an underdeveloped yet vital agricultural sector, desertification, and a rising sexual violence epidemic.

Politically, the state's 2019 elections were a mixed bag for both major parties. In federal elections, Buhari held the state for the APC albeit with a reduced margin of victory while the APC swept all senate seats by winning back two seats it lost due to defections. Both major parties lost seats in House of Representatives elections to the benefit of the minor People's Redemption Party. On the state level, Mohammed unseated APC incumbent Governor Mohammed Abdullahi Abubakar by a narrow margin as the APC held the House of Assembly. During the terms, defections rose the APC's numbers in the federal House while increasing PDP numbers in the state assembly, solidifying Bauchi's politically competitive status.

Over the course of Mohammed's term, his administration stated focuses included education, forging a positive business environment, mineral resources, and agriculture development. In terms of his performance, Mohammed was praised for signing a bill to combat violence against women and following through on some campaign promises but was criticized for awarding inflated contracts to a company in which he is a director, buying the state PDP chairman a car with government money, a flawed COVID-19 response, continued corruption investigations from his time as FCT Minister, attacks on press freedoms, and his brief early 2021 spat with Benue State Governor Samuel Ortom which descended into ethnic gibes.

== Primary elections ==
The primaries, along with any potential challenges to primary results, were to take place between 4 April and 3 June 2022 but the deadline was extended to 9 June. In terms of zoning, some candidates and community leaders under the group Zauren Mutanen Bauchi have requested that the governorship be zoned to either the Bauchi North or Central senatorial districts as the last three Bauchi governors have come from the Southern district. However, no major party has yet closed their primaries to candidates from the South.

=== All Progressives Congress ===
Arguments over zoning divided the state APC ahead of the primary as northern politicians publicly advocated for the party nominee to come from the North senatorial district while prospective candidates from other regions argued for the primary to be kept open.

On 20 April 2022, the APC National Executive Committee announced the party's schedule for gubernatorial primaries, setting its expression of interest form price at ₦10 million and nomination form price at ₦40 million with a 50% nomination form discount for candidates younger than 40 while women and candidates with disabilities get free nomination forms. Forms were to be sold from 26 April to 6 May until the deadline was later extended to 10 May then 12 May. After the submission of nomination forms by 13 May, candidates were screened by a party committee on 14 and 15 May while 16 May was the date for the screening appeal process. Ward congresses and LGA congresses were set for between 7 and 9 May to elect delegates for the primary. Candidates approved by the screening process advanced to a primary set for 26 May, in concurrence with other APC gubernatorial primaries; challenges to the result could be made the next day.

Seven screened candidates participated in the primary, with Chief of the Air Staff Sadique Abubakar winning by a margin of about 9% over first runner-up, Senator Halliru Dauda Jika. In his acceptance speech, Abubakar thanked supportive delegates before calling on his former opponents to work with him for the benefit of the party. However, Halliru Dauda Jika–the first runner-up–left the party for the NNPP a few weeks after the primary and obtained the party's gubernatorial nomination.

==== Nominated ====
- Sadique Abubakar: Ambassador to Chad (2021–present) and former Chief of the Air Staff (2015–2021)
      - Running mate—Shehu Aliyu Musa: former House of Representatives member

==== Eliminated in primary ====
- Musa Babayo: former Chairman of the Tertiary Education Trust Fund (2013–2015) and former PDP National Secretary (2012–2015)
- Halliru Dauda Jika: Senator for Bauchi Central (2019–present) and former House of Representatives member for Darazo/Ganjuwa (2007–2019) (defected after the primary to successfully run in the NNPP rerun primary)
- Mahmood Maijama'a: former Secretary to the State Government and former Commissioner of Finance
- Nura Manu Soro: former Commissioner of Finance (2019)
- Farouk Mustapha: 2019 NNPP Bauchi North senatorial nominee and former House of Representatives member for Katagum (2003–2007) (defected after the primary)
- Muhammad Ali Pate: Minister of State for Health (2011–2013)

==== Withdrew ====
- Muhammad Sani Alamin
- Bala Mohammed Jibrin: 2019 APC gubernatorial candidate, former APC National Auditor (2014–2015), and former commissioner
- Yusuf Tuggar: Ambassador to Germany (2017–present), 2015 APC gubernatorial candidate, former House of Representatives member for Gamawa (2007–2011), and 2011 CPC gubernatorial nominee

==== Declined ====
- Yakubu Shehu Abdullahi: House of Representatives member for Bauchi (2019–present)
- Mohammed Abdullahi Abubakar: former Governor (2015–2019) and former state Attorney-General
- Lawal Yahaya Gumau: Senator for Bauchi South (2018–present) and former House of Representatives member for Toro (2011–2018)
- Adamu Muhammad Bulkachuwa: Senator for Bauchi North (2019–present) and husband of former President of the Nigerian Courts of Appeal Zainab Adamu Bulkachuwa
- Abubakar Maikafi: former Senator for Bauchi South (2003–2007)
- Abdullahi Babani Tela: a Deputy Comptroller General of Customs

==== Results ====
Candidates' vote share
1. Sadique Abubakar (36.2%)
2. Halliru Dauda Jika (27.2%)
3. Nura Manu Soro (26.4%)
4. Musa Babayo (6.86%)
5. Other candidates (3.32%)

APC primary results
Party	Candidate	Votes	%
APC	Sadique Abubakar	370	36.24%
APC	Halliru Dauda Jika	278	27.23%
APC	Nura Manu Soro	269	26.35%
APC	Musa Babayo	70	6.86%
APC	Farouk Mustapha	26	2.55%
APC	Mahmood Maijama'a	8	0.78%
APC	Muhammad Ali Pate	0	0.00%
Total votes		1,021	100.00%
Invalid or blank votes		7	N/A
Turnout		1,028	Unknown

=== People's Democratic Party ===
Ahead of the primary, incumbent Governor Mohammed announced that he would run for president. The announcement set into motion an open primary until rumours emerged that Mohammed was still looking to run for governor as a back-up plan. By May, several reports came out with confirmation that Mohammed had purchased a gubernatorial nomination form while concurrently running for president with the intention of having former Secretary to the State Government Ibrahim Kashim win the gubernatorial primary and give Mohammed the nomination if his presidential campaign failed.

On 16 March 2022, the national PDP announced its gubernatorial primaries' schedule, setting its expression of interest form price at ₦1 million and the nomination form price at ₦20 million with a 50% discount for candidates between 25 and 30. Forms were to be sold until 1 April but the party later extended the deadline four times before reaching a final deadline of 22 April. After the submission of nomination forms by 25 April, candidates were screened by a party committee on 28 April while 2 May was the rescheduled date for the screening appeal process. Ward congresses were set for 29 April and LGA congresses were rescheduled for 10 May to elect delegates for the primary. Candidates approved by the screening process advanced to a primary set for 25 May, in concurrence with all other PDP gubernatorial primaries; challenges to the result could be made in the following days.

On the primary date, Kashim was the sole candidate and won the nomination unopposed. In his acceptance speech, Kashim thanked the party while pledging to continue the work of the Mohammed administration. However, a few days after the gubernatorial primary, Mohammed lost the PDP presidential primary and the plan to substitute him in as the gubernatorial nominee immediately commenced. On 31 May, Kashim withdrew from the nomination, stating "I know right from day one that if the governor didn't get the PDP presidential ticket, I will definitely step down for him." A few days later, Mohammed reappointed Kashim to his cabinet before winning the rerun primary on 4 June unopposed.

In August, Muhammad Auwal Jatau — MHR for Zaki — was picked as the deputy gubernatorial nominee instead of incumbent Deputy Governor Baba Tela. Jatau thanked Mohammed for the "great honour."

==== Nominated ====
- Bala Mohammed: Governor (2019–present), Minister of the Federal Capital Territory (2010–2015), and former Senator for Bauchi South (2007–2010)
  - Running mate—Muhammad Auwal Jatau: House of Representatives member for Zaki (2020–present)

==== Withdrew after nomination ====
- Ibrahim Kashim: former Secretary to the State Government

==== Withdrew ====
- Ahmad Ahmed Mu’azu: son of former Governor Ahmadu Adamu Mu’azu
- Sulaiman Mohammed Nazif: former Senator for Bauchi Central (2007–2011; 2015–2019)

==== Declined ====
- Abdul Ahmed Ningi: 2019 PDP gubernatorial candidate, former Senator for Bauchi Central (2011–2015), and former House of Representatives member for Ningi/Warji (1999–2011)
- Sallau Ahmed Dandija: former Secretary to the State Government

==== Results ====
Original primary results

PDP original primary results
Party	Candidate	Votes	%
PDP	Ibrahim Kashim	655	100.00%
Total votes		655	100.00%
Invalid or blank votes		1	N/A
Turnout		656	100.00%

PDP rerun primary results
Party	Candidate	Votes	%
PDP	Bala Mohammed	646	100.00%
Total votes		646	100.00%
Turnout		646	98.48%

=== Minor parties ===
- Magaji Musa (Action Alliance)
  - Running mate: Zakka Mutashi Bisu
- Usman Dankyrana Mustapha (Action Democratic Party)
  - Running mate: Fodi Bashir Usman
- Kabiru Abdulhamid Shuwa (Action Peoples Party)
  - Running mate: Mahmood Yunusa
- Buhari Adamu Idris (African Action Congress)
  - Running mate: Hassan Hayatuddeen
- Saleh Auwalu Dahiru (African Democratic Congress)
  - Running mate: Ibrahim Bappah
- Auwal Isah (Allied Peoples Movement)
  - Running mate: Nura Muhammad Musa
- Abubakar Ibrahim (Labour Party)
  - Running mate: Umar Ikilma
- Halliru Dauda Jika (New Nigeria Peoples Party)
  - Running mate: Dahuwa Mohammed Gadauji
- Saleh Sulaiman (National Rescue Movement)
  - Running mate: Ahmed Suleiman Isah
- Farouk Ahmed Umar (People's Redemption Party)
  - Running mate: Sunusi Yusuf Jalam
- Aminu Mohammed (Social Democratic Party)
  - Running mate: Mohammed Usman
- Khalid Hassan (Zenith Labour Party)
  - Running mate: Asmau Muhammad Ahmad

== Campaign ==
As the general election campaign began in June 2022, Mohammed began to attack Abubakar by accusing him and one of his wives—Sadiya Umar Farouq, the serving Minister of Humanitarian Affairs, Disaster Management & Social Development—of stealing public funds to finance his campaign. Abubakar and the APC looked elsewhere as the party dealt with the aftermath of several prominent defections with Senators Halliru Dauda Jika and Lawal Yahaya Gumau joining the NNPP; Jika became the NNPP gubernatorial nominee as well. Pundits identified numerous potential factors for the general election, namely: regional identity—Abubakar is from Bauchi North district which has produced no governors in over 20 years, Jika's candidacy, the power of Mohammed's incumbency, the defections from the APC, and "federal might" in favor of the APC. For each major contender, OrderPaper Nigeria noted strengths and weaknesses with Mohammed being helped by his administration's infrastructural development but hurt by nepotism allegations; Jika being aided by the pre-existing Kwankwasiyya NNPP structure in the state but hurt by regionalism and zoning favoring the northern district; and Abubakar being helped by his military service but hurt by his lack of political experience and APC infighting. By September, multiple reports had classified Jika as a major candidate while the Daily Trust focused on the difficulties incumbent Bauchi governors have faced in their re-election bids. In the same month, Abubakar was embroiled in controversy as he was accused of falsifying his certificates.

In November, a new dynamic entered the race due to the simmering feud between Mohammed and PDP presidential nominee Atiku Abubakar (along with former Governor Ahmadu Adamu Mu’azu and former Senator Abdul Ahmed Ningi). Analysis from The Nation noted the PDP divides as a potentially major factor in the election in addition to regional and religious factors. Conversely, the APC faced division as former Governor Mohammed Abdullahi Abubakar backed Mohammed over Abubakar in December 2022. As the election neared in February 2023, review of the race's regional factors noted the importance of the highly competitive, vote-heavy Bauchi South Senatorial District amid the PDP crisis in the area; the likelihood that Abubakar would win the Bauchi North Senatorial District due to its large number of prominent APC stalwarts; and the likelihood that Mohammed would win the Bauchi Central Senatorial District as Jika is expected to split the anti-PDP vote.

Later in February, focus switched to the presidential election on 25 February. In the election, Bauchi State voted for Atiku Abubakar (PDP); Abubakar won the state with 50.0% of the vote, beating Bola Tinubu (APC) at 37.1% and Rabiu Kwankwaso (NNPP) at 8.5%. Despite the presidential result, gubernatorial election analysis reiterated the race's competitiveness along with continued fights between Mohammed and other PDP figures. Nonetheless, the EiE-SBM forecast projected Mohammed to win based on "how the presidential elections played out."

== Projections ==
Source	Projection	As of
Africa Elects (Note: AfricaElects projections predict the likelihood of a candidate winning a state by categorizing a state as "Safe" for exceedingly likely, "Likely" for somewhat likely, and "Lean" for least likely. If no clear determination could be made, states are categorized as "tossups".)	Tossup	17 March 2023
Enough is Enough- SBM Intelligence (Note: EiE-SBM projections predict which candidates will win states.)	Mohammed	2 March 2023

== Conduct ==
=== Electoral timetable ===
On 26 February 2022, the Independent National Electoral Commission released the timetable, setting out key dates and deadlines for the election. Months later on 27 May 2022, INEC made a slight revision to the timetable, allowing parties extra time to conduct primaries.

- 28 February 2022 – Publication of Notice of Election
- 4 April 2022 – First day for the conduct of party primaries
- 9 June 2022 (Note: The original deadline was 3 June; however, INEC pushed it back to 9 June at the behest of parties.) – Final day for the conduct of party primaries, including the resolution of disputes arising from them
- 1 July 2022 – First day for submission of nomination forms to INEC via the online portal
- 15 July 2022 – Final day for submission of nomination forms to INEC via the online portal
- 12 October 2022 – Commencement of the official campaign period
- 16 March 2023 (Note: The original deadline was 9 March; however, INEC pushed it back to 16 March.) – Final day of the official campaign period

== General election ==
=== Results ===
Candidates' vote share
1. Bala Mohammed (PDP) (50.8%)
2. Sadique Abubakar (APC) (41.8%)
3. Halliru Dauda Jika (NNPP) (5.85%)
4. Other candidates (1.58%)

2023 Bauchi State gubernatorial election
Party	Candidate	Votes	%
AA	Magaji Musa		
ADP	Usman Dankyrana Mustapha		
APP	Kabiru Abdulhamid Shuwa		
AAC	Buhari Adamu Idris		
ADC	Saleh Auwalu Dahiru		
APM	Auwal Isah		
APC	Sadique Abubakar		
LP	Abubakar Ibrahim		
NNPP	Halliru Dauda Jika		
NRM	Saleh Sulaiman		
PDP	Bala Mohammed		
PRP	Farouk Ahmed Umar		
SDP	Aminu Mohammed		
ZLP	Khalid Hassan		
Total votes			100.00%
Invalid or blank votes			N/A
Turnout			

==== By senatorial district ====
The results of the election by senatorial district.

Senatorial District	Sadique Abubakar APC		Halliru Dauda Jika NNPP		Bala Mohammed PDP		Others		Total Valid Votes
Senatorial District	Votes	Percentage	Votes	Percentage	Votes	Percentage	Votes	Percentage	Total Valid Votes
Bauchi Central Senatorial District (Note: Comprising the local government areas of Damban, Darazo, Ganjuwa, Misau, Ningi, and Warji.)	114,501	43.46%	22,951	8.71%	120,249	45.64%	5,750	2.18%	263,451
Bauchi North Senatorial District (Note: Comprising the local government areas of Gamawa, Giade, Itas/Gadau, Jamaare, Katagum, Shira, and Zaki.)	145,714	47.20%	15,448	5.00%	145,185	47.03%	2,392	0.77%	308,739
Bauchi South Senatorial District (Note: Comprising the local government areas of Alkaleri, Bauchi, Bogoro, Dass, Kirfi, Tafawa Balewa, and Toro.)	172,087	37.23%	22,085	4.78%	259,847	56.22%	8,212	1.78%	462,231
Totals	432,272	41.79%	60,496	5.85%	525,280	50.78%	16,331	1.58%	1,034,379

Percentage of the vote won by Abubakar and Mohammed by district.

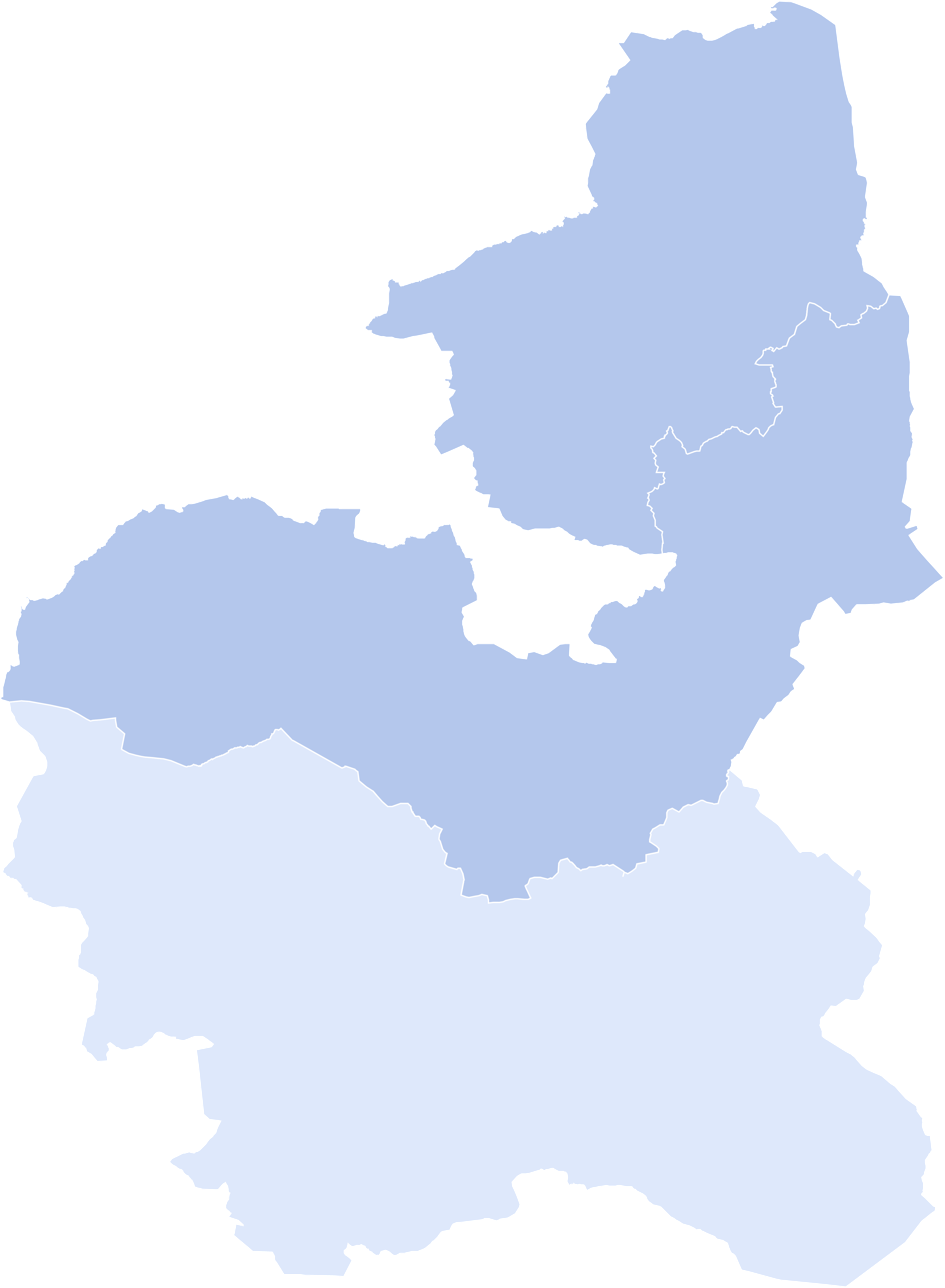
Abubakar; 30–40% 40–50%

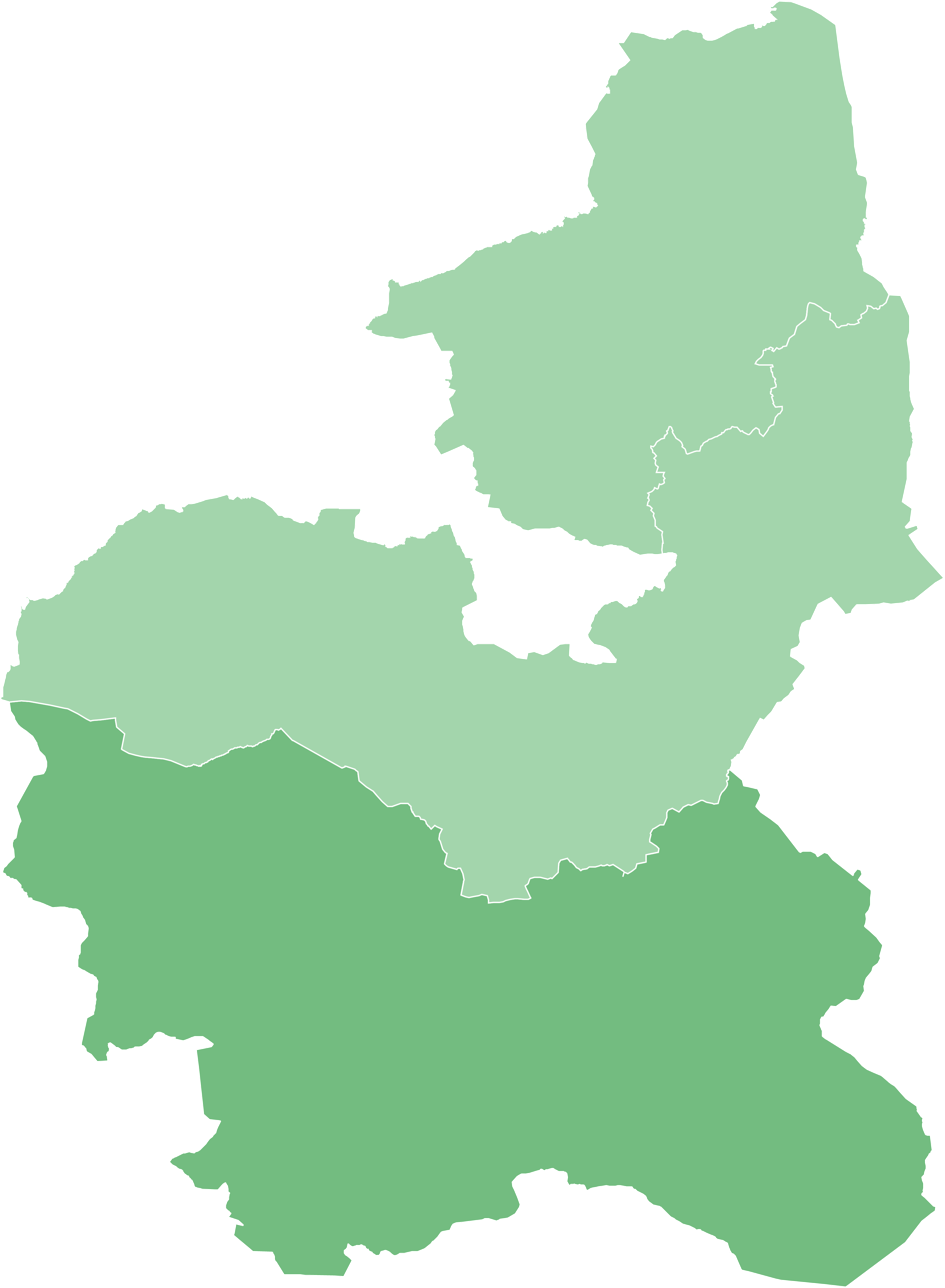
Mohammed; 40–50% 50–60%

==== By federal constituency ====
The results of the election by federal constituency.

Federal Constituency	Sadique Abubakar APC		Halliru Dauda Jika NNPP		Bala Mohammed PDP		Others		Total Valid Votes
Federal Constituency	Votes	Percentage	Votes	Percentage	Votes	Percentage	Votes	Percentage	Total Valid Votes
Alkaleri/Kirfi Federal Constituency (Note: Comprising the local government areas of Alkaleri and Kirfi.)	55,500	37.33%	11,806	7.94%	80,312	54.01%	1,069	0.72%	148,687
Bauchi Federal Constituency (Note: Comprising the local government area of Bauchi.)	69,850	43.95%	5,749	3.62%	80,390	50.59%	2,920	1.84%	158,909
Darazo/Ganjuwa Federal Constituency (Note: Comprising the local government areas of Darazo and Ganjuwa.)	41,150	43.58%	10,746	11.38%	40,660	43.06%	1,865	1.98%	94,421
Dass/Bogoro/Tafawa Balewa Federal Constituency (Note: Comprising the local government areas of Dass, Bogoro, and Tafawa Balewa.)	44,960	37.10%	7,062	5.83%	66,160	54.59%	3,016	2.49%	121,198
Gamawa Federal Constituency (Note: Comprising the local government area of Gamawa.)	22,565	48.80%	1,841	3.98%	21,558	46.63%	272	0.59%	46,236
Jama’are/Itas-Gadau Federal Constituency (Note: Comprising the local government areas of Jamaare and Itas/Gadau.)	28,071	41.89%	6,166	9.20%	32,471	48.45%	310	0.46%	67,018
Katagum Federal Constituency (Note: Comprising the local government area of Katagum.)	35,774	55.27%	2,376	3.67%	25,218	38.96%	1,360	2.10%	64,728
Misau/Dambam Federal Constituency (Note: Comprising the local government areas of Misau and Dambam.)	37,773	49.13%	6,215	8.08%	29,658	38.58%	3,234	4.21%	76,880
Ningi/Warji Federal Constituency (Note: Comprising the local government areas of Ningi and Warji.)	35,578	38.61%	5,990	6.50%	49,931	54.18%	651	0.71%	92,150
Shira/Giade Federal Constituency (Note: Comprising the local government areas of Shira and Giade.)	39,667	47.70%	3,650	4.39%	39,518	47.53%	317	0.38%	83,152
Toro Federal Constituency (Note: Comprising the local government area of Toro.)	29,848	29.71%	3,634	3.62%	65,456	65.16%	1,517	1.51%	100,455
Zaki Federal Constituency (Note: Comprising the local government area of Zaki.)	19,637	41.25%	1,415	2.97%	26,420	55.50%	133	0.28%	47,605
Totals	432,272	41.79%	60,496	5.85%	525,280	50.78%	16,331	1.58%	1,034,379

Percentage of the vote won by Abubakar and Mohammed by constituency.

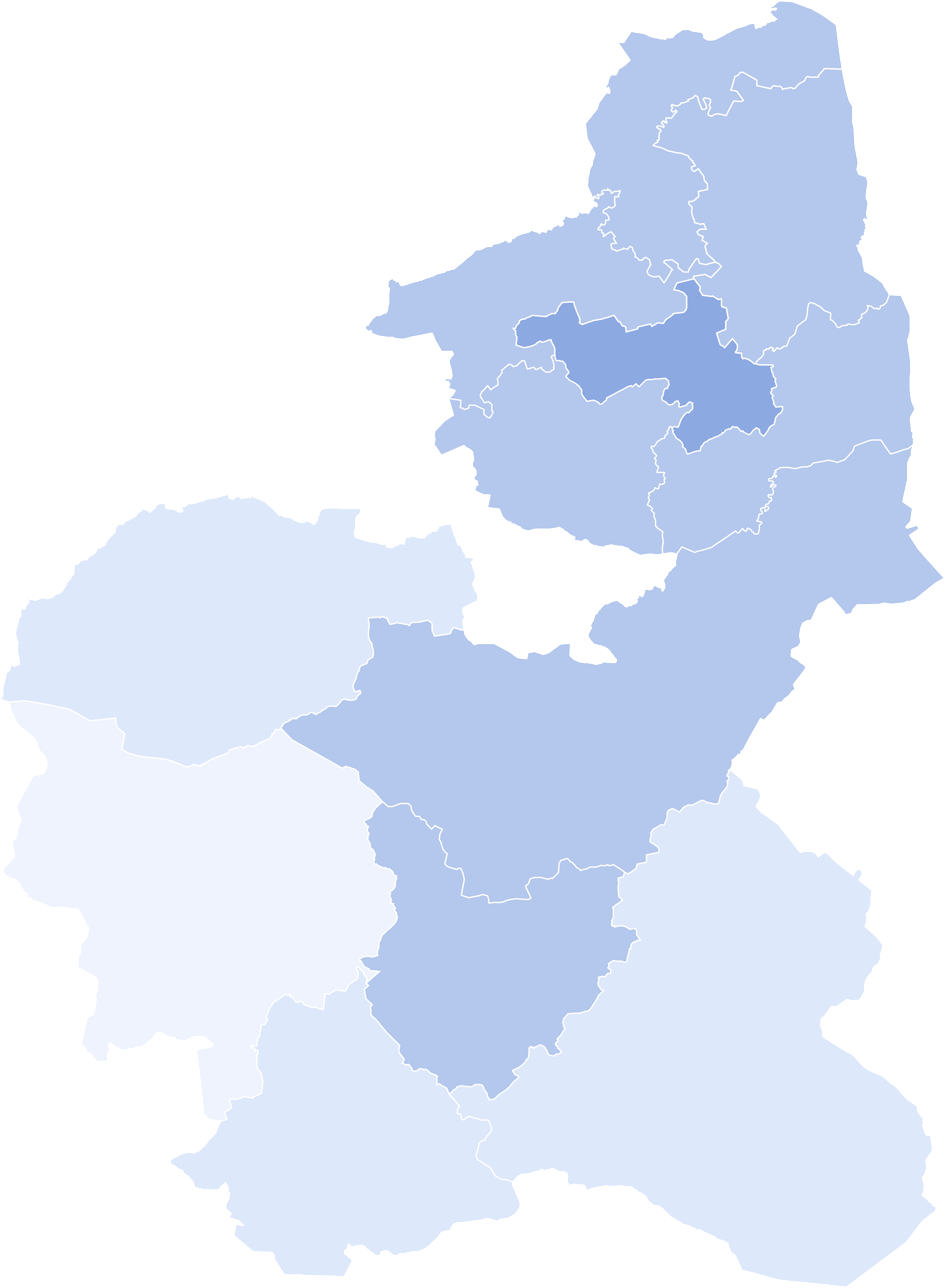
Abubakar <30% 30–40% 40–50% 50–60%

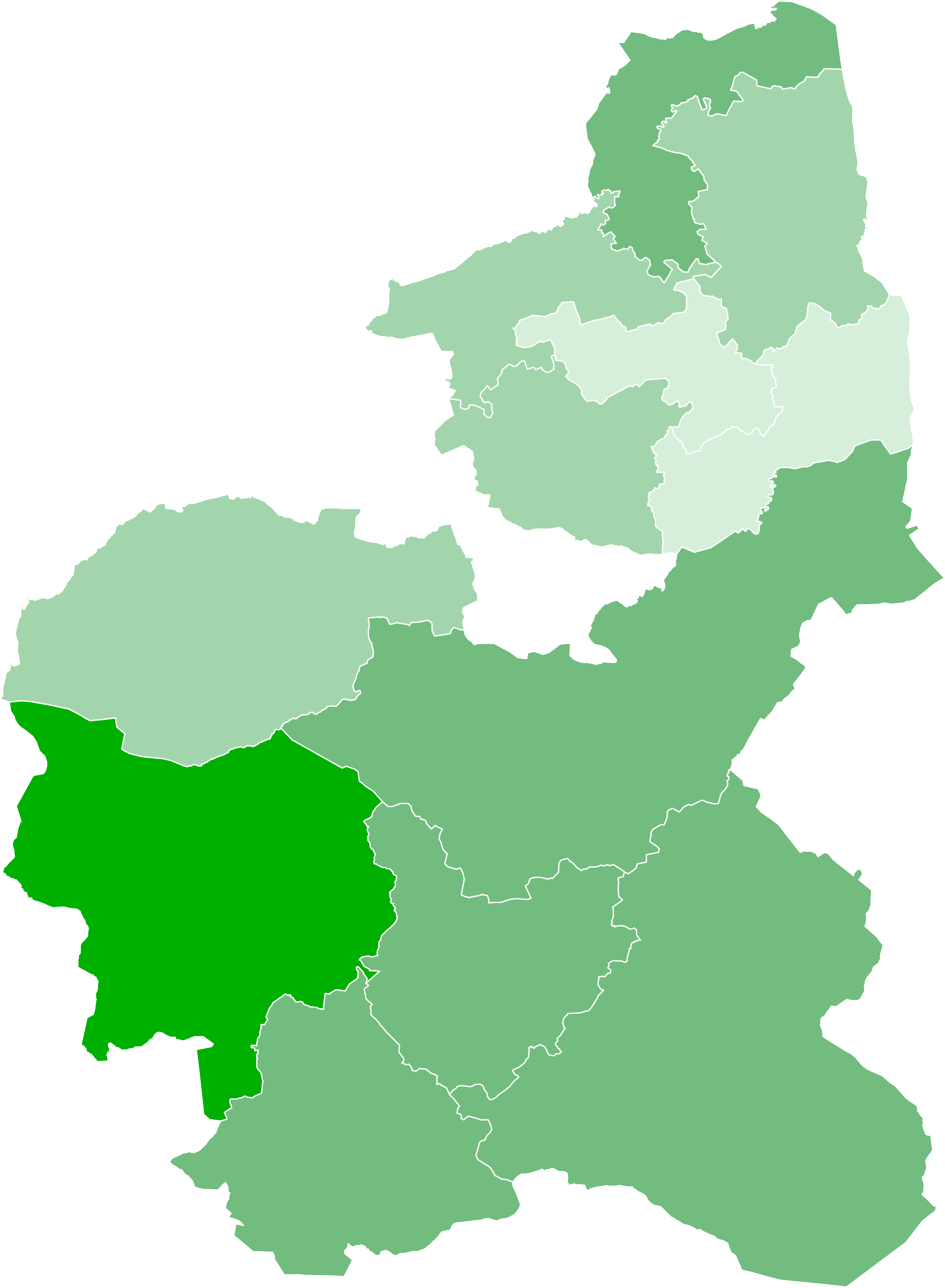
Mohammed; 30–40% 40–50% 50–60% 60–70%

==== By local government area ====
The results of the election by local government area.

LGA	Sadique Abubakar APC		Halliru Dauda Jika NNPP		Bala Mohammed PDP		Others		Total Valid Votes	Turnout Percentage
LGA	Votes	Percentage	Votes	Percentage	Votes	Percentage	Votes	Percentage	Total Valid Votes	Turnout Percentage
Alkaleri	15,798	29.89%	2,069	3.92%	34,387	65.06%	598	1.13%	52,852	35.29%
Bauchi	69,850	43.95%	5,749	3.62%	80,390	50.59%	2,920	1.84%	158,909	35.12%
Bogoro	10,436	33.82%	3,253	10.54%	16,589	53.77%	576	1.87%	30,854	42.04%
Damban	11,325	37.27%	4,395	14.46%	13,307	43.79%	1,362	4.48%	30,389	36.82%
Darazo	23,544	49.52%	3,359	7.07%	19,736	41.51%	901	1.90%	47,540	39.88%
Dass	11,596	40.95%	643	2.27%	14,471	51.10%	1,607	5.68%	28,317	42.32%
Gamawa	22,565	48.80%	1,841	3.98%	21,558	46.63%	272	0.59%	46,236	31.79%
Ganjuwa	17,606	37.55%	7,387	15.76%	20,924	44.63%	964	2.06%	46,881	37.93%
Giade	18,023	53.96%	1,114	3.33%	14,145	42.35%	119	0.36%	33,401	45.67%
Itas/Gadau	16,206	42.59%	2,913	7.65%	18,778	49.35%	156	0.41%	38,053	34.41%
Jamaare	11,865	40.96%	3,253	11.23%	13,693	47.27%	154	0.53%	28,965	45.16%
Katagum	35,774	55.27%	2,376	3.67%	25,218	38.96%	1,360	2.10%	64,728	35.13%
Kirfi	11,631	40.36%	3,571	12.39%	13,454	46.69%	161	0.56%	28,817	19.09%
Misau	26,448	56.89%	1,820	3.91%	16,351	35.17%	1,872	4.03%	46,491	36.22%
Ningi	23,795	41.16%	4,178	7.23%	29,515	51.06%	316	0.55%	57,804	33.00%
Shira	21,644	43.50%	2,536	5.10%	25,373	51.00%	198	0.40%	49,751	46.31%
Tafawa Balewa	22,928	36.97%	3,166	5.10%	35,100	56.59%	833	1.34%	62,027	40.75%
Toro	29,848	29.71%	3,634	3.62%	65,456	65.16%	1,517	1.51%	100,455	43.65%
Warji	11,783	34.31%	1,812	5.28%	20,416	59.44%	335	0.97%	34,346	49.43%
Zaki	19,637	41.25%	1,415	2.97%	26,420	55.50%	133	0.28%	47,605	38.70%
Totals	432,272	41.79%	60,496	5.85%	525,280	50.78%	16,331	1.58%	1,034,379	38.18%

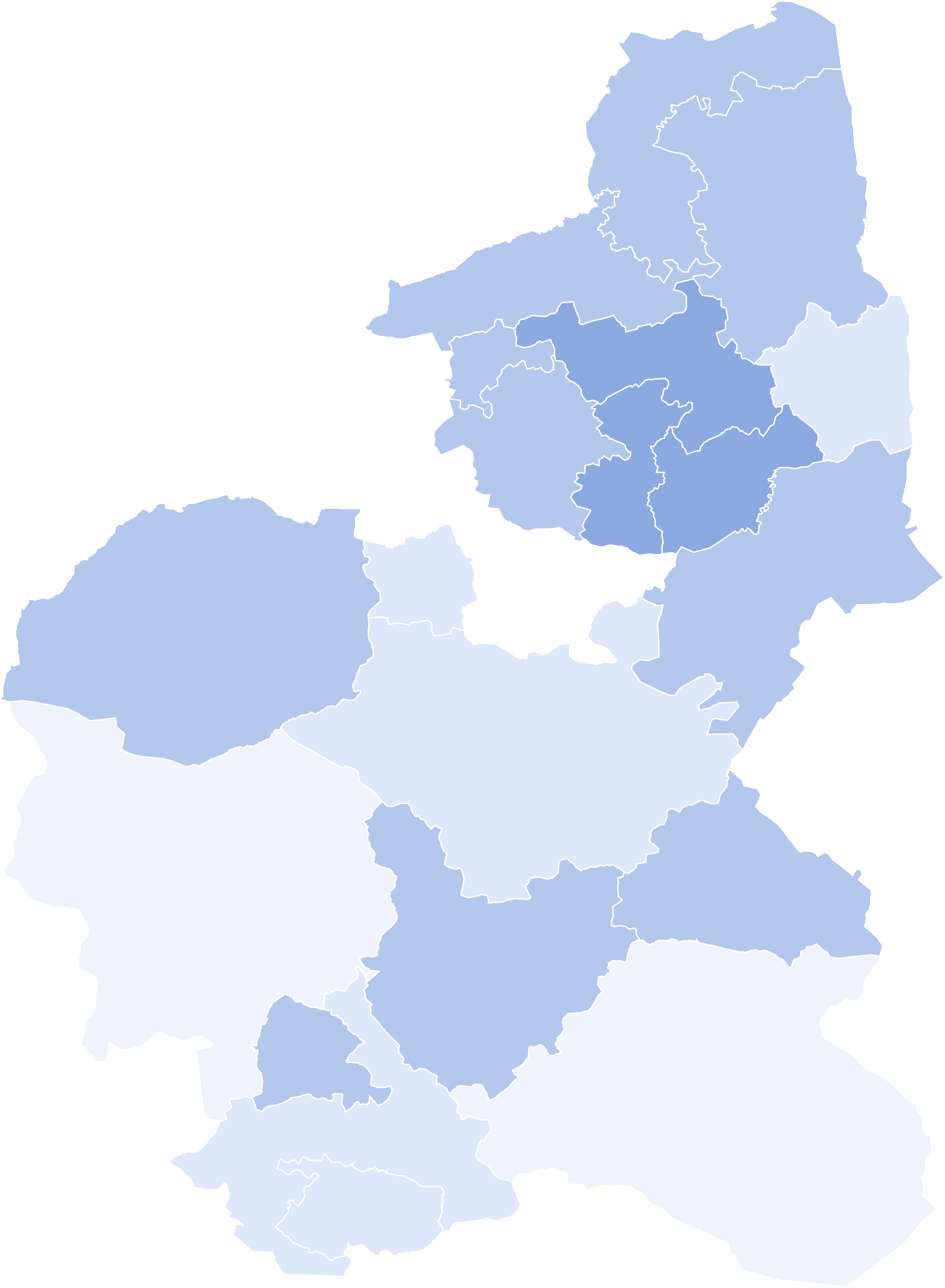
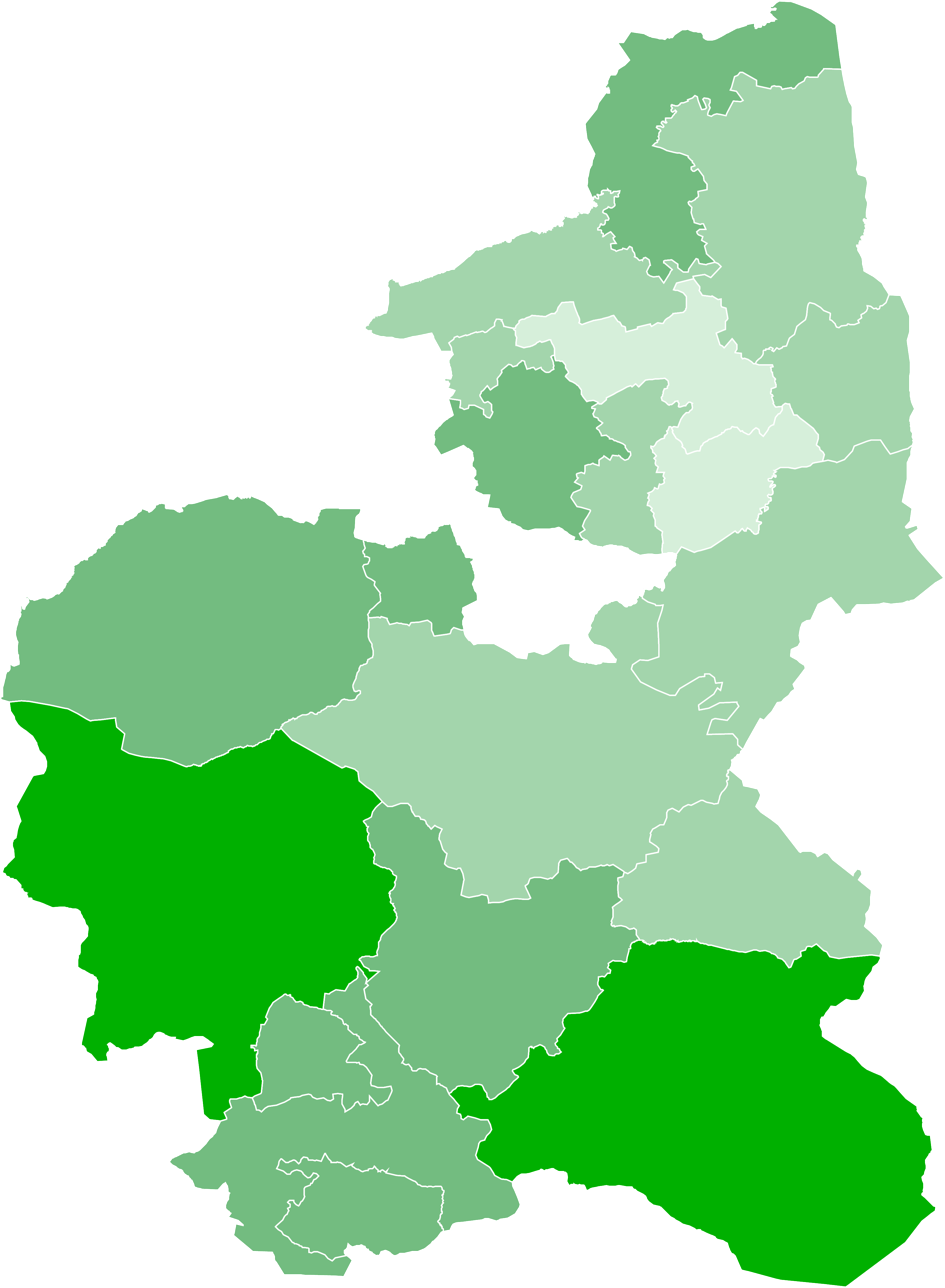
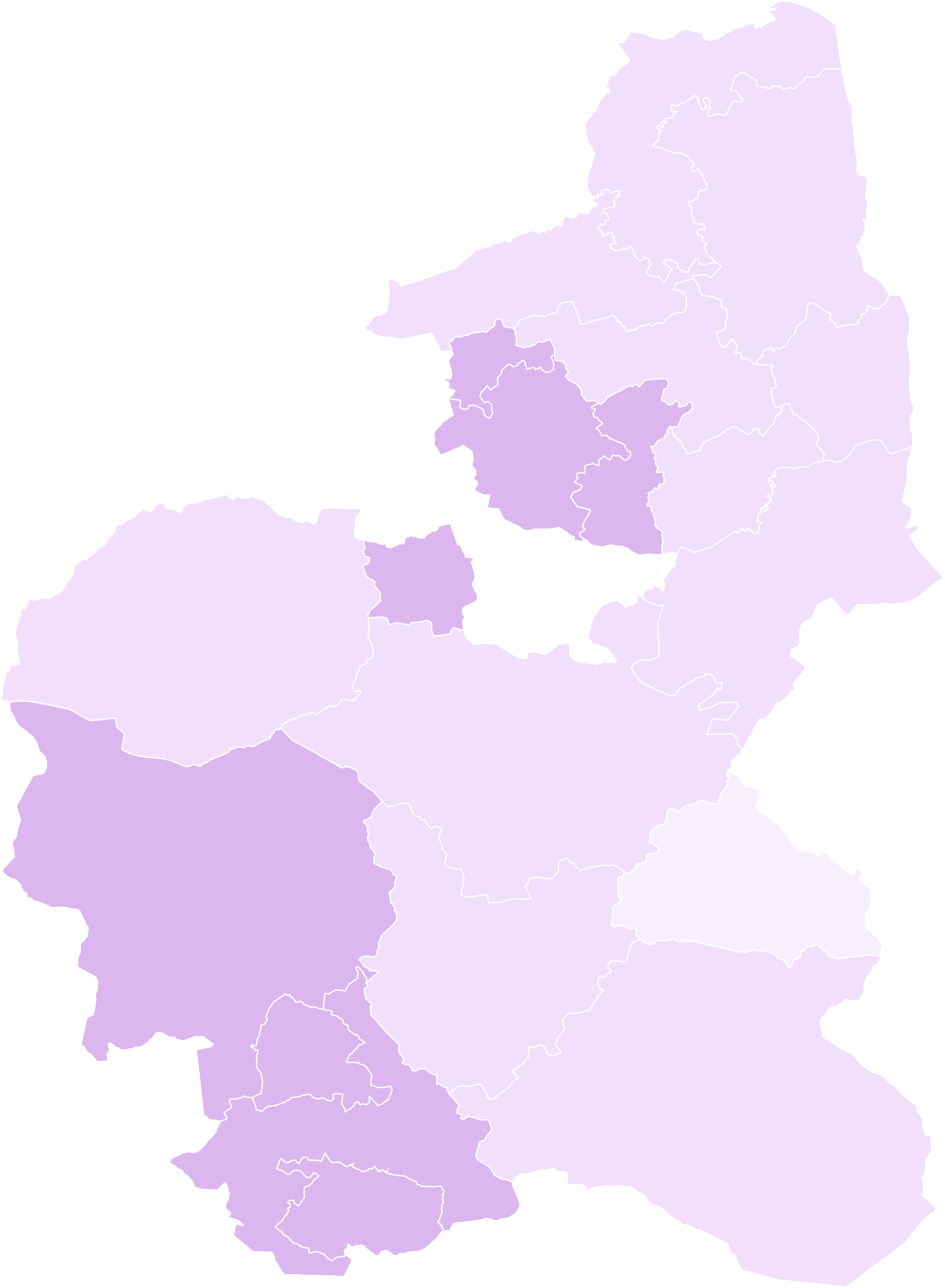
Percentage of the vote won by Abubakar and Mohammed by LGA.		Turnout Percentage by LGA
Abubakar <30% 30–40% 40–50% 50–60%	Mohammed; 30–40% 40–50% 50–60% 60–70%	Turnout <30% 30–40% 40–50%

== See also ==
- 2023 Nigerian elections
- 2023 Nigerian gubernatorial elections
