= Panawa language =

Kainji language spoken in Nigeria

Panawa
- Bujiyel
- Native to: Nigeria
- Region: Toro LGA, Bauchi State
- Native speakers: 3,000-4,000 (2021)
- Language family: Niger–Congo?: Atlantic–Congo; Benue–Congo; Kainji; East Kainji; Shammo; Panawa

Language codes
- ISO 639-3: pwb
- Glottolog: pana1298

Panawa
- Person: ɔnɔPanawa
- People: anɔPanawa
- Language: iPanawa

Panawa (Bujiyel) is an East Kainji language of Nigeria belonging to the Shammo cluster.

Panawa is mostly closely related to Boze.

== Distribution ==
There are probably no more than 3,000-4,000 ethnic Panawa. The Panawa live in the following five villages of Toro LGA, Bauchi State.

- Akusεru (Fadan Bujiyel)
- Zabaŋa
- Adizənə
- Akayzoro
- Kaŋkay

The 5 Panawa villages were originally located on a hill called Owo Panawa. All 5 villages were relocated down to the plains in 1948, retaining their original names and clan structures. Each of the villages corresponds to an exogamous clan.
