= Wakili =

Wakili is a surname and middle name. Notable people with the name include:

- Muhammad Wakili
- Ado Wakili
- Malam Wakili
- Balarabe Wakili
- Aliyu Wakili Boya
