= Shammo =

Shammo may refer to:

- Shammo languages, a subgroup of East Kainji languages spoken in Nigeria
- Nareen Shammo (born 1986), Iraqi Yazidi investigative journalist

== See also ==
- Shammos, an alternative spelling of shamash; see Shamash (disambiguation)
