= Babayo =

Babayo is a given name and surname. Notable people with the name include:

- Babayo Akuyam (fl. early 21st century), Nigerian politician
- Babayo Garba Gamawa (1966–2019), Nigerian businessman
- Musa Babayo (born 1957), Nigerian banker and businessman
