= Gazali Abubakar Wunti =

Nigerian politician

Gazali Abubakar Wunti is a Nigerian politician. He currently serves as the State Representatives representing Ganjuwa East constituency at the Bauchi State House of Assembly.
