= Mallawa, Toro =

Street in Toro, Nigeria

Mallawa is the main street in Toro, Bauchi State, Nigeria. Most residents of the street are Fulani, who migrated from Mali into Nigeria for about two or more hundred years back, they are Fulani a Muslim ethnic group. The street has 4 polling units that include Mallawa II Gyamzo Primary School (PU: 05/18/01/003) Mallawa III Court (PU: 05/18/01/005) Mallawa IV Primary School (PU: 05/18/01/013) Mallawa I Gyamzo Primary School (PU: 05/18/01/002).
