= Buji language =

Buji language may refer to:

- Boze, a language of Nigeria
- Buzi, another name for Ndau (Mozambique)
