= Dabo Haruna =

Nigerian politician (born 1982)

Dabo Ismaila Haruna

Member of the House of Representatives from Bauchi State
- In office 2023–Incumbent
- Constituency: Toro Federal Constituency

Personal details
- Born: 29 March 1982 (age 44)
- Party: All Progressives Congress
- Occupation: Politician

Dabo Ismaila Haruna (born 29 March 1982) is a Nigerian politician. He is currently serving as the member representing Toro Federal Constituency of Bauchi State in the House of Representatives.
