= Moro language (Nigeria) =

Language spoken in north-central Nigeria

Moro
- Native to: Nigeria
- Region: Plateau State, Bauchi State, Kaduna State, and Kano State
- Language family: Niger–Congo?: Atlantic–Congo; Benue–Congo; Kainji; East Kainji; Shammo; Moro

Language codes
- ISO 639-3: –

Moro
- Person: ɔdaneMoro
- People: aneMoro
- Language: è-Moro

Moro is an East Kainji language of Nigeria belonging to the Shammo cluster.

== Distribution ==
Moro is spoken in Plateau, Bauchi, Kaduna, and Kano states. There are about 20 villages, which are:

- Villages in Toro LGA, Bauchi State: Danka, Dankarau, Doka Limoro, Falingu, Girya, Pindel, Yada Bongo
- Villages in Kauru LGA, Kaduna State: Kauru Taru, Kuzuntu
- Villages in Lere LGA, Kaduna State: Lezuru, Marmara, Sabon cini
- Villages in Doguwa LGA, Kano State: Lemu, Nasarawa
- Villages in Bassa LGA, Plateau State: Abubu, Bishen kafe, Gitu, Gondoŋ, Kabake, Katirbi, Kazongo, Legeng, Orade, Ɔkɛma, Ɔsɛ, Rema
