= Habibah Ruth Garba =

Nigerian air force officer

- Born: Nigeria
- Citizenship: Nigerian
- Occupation: Air Force officer
- Known for: First woman promoted to air commodore in the Nigerian Air Force
- Awards: Karis Award (2013); Female Achievers’ Award, WIMBIZ Conference (2018)

Habibah Ruth Garba is an Air commodore in the Nigerian Air Force. She is the first woman to be promoted to the rank of air commodore in Nigerian Air Force. She worn the Karis Award in 2013 and the Female Achievers’ Award of the Women in Management, Business and Public Service (WIMBIZ) 2018 conference in Nigeria.

== Career ==
Garba is an air commodore in the Nigerian Air Force, Nigeria. She is the first woman to be promoted to the rank of air commodore in Nigerian Air Force. She emerged the winner of 2013 Karis Award. This is an annual award of the Household of God Church in Nigeria. The award is part of the annual GRACE programme of the church initiated in 1990. She also worn the Female Achievers’ Award in the Women in Management, Business and Public Service (WIMBIZ) 2018 conference. The conference is constituted to implement programs that inspire, empower and promote more representation of women in public and private sectors.

== See also ==
- Sadique Abubakar
