= Takandan Giwa =

Takandan Giwa is a small village in Toro Local Government Area, Bauchi State, Nigeria. The village is under a district called Jama`a and the ward called Zaranda.

The village is located along Bauchi - Jos Road. The distance from Bauchi, the capital of Bauchi State, is 47 kilometers. The distance from Jos, the capital of Plateau State, is 79 kilometers.
