= Laraba =

Laraba is a surname. Notable people with the surname include:

- Bob Laraba (1933–1962), American football player as a linebacker and quarterback
- Gambo Laraba Abdullahi (born 1951), Nigerian chemist
