= Loro language =

East Kainji language of Nigeria

Loro
- Native to: Nigeria
- Region: Toro LGA, Bauchi State
- Native speakers: 1,500 (2003)
- Language family: Niger–Congo?: Atlantic–Congo; Benue–Congo; Kainji; East Kainji; Shammo; Loro

Language codes
- ISO 639-3: –

Lɔrɔ
- Person: ɔnɔLɔrɔ
- People: anoLɔrɔ
- Language: iLɔrɔ

Loro is an East Kainji language of Toro LGA, Bauchi State, Nigeria belonging to the Shammo cluster.
