= Bunu =

Bunu can refer to:

- Bu-Nao language, a Hmong–Mien language
- Bunu languages, a putative branch of the Hmongic languages
- Bunu language (Nigeria), an East Kainji language of Nigeria
- Kabba/Bunu, a local government area in Kogi State, Nigeria
