= 2019 Bauchi State House of Assembly election =

Nigerian state election

The 2019 Bauchi State House of Assembly election was held on 9 March 2019 to elect members of the Bauchi State House of Assembly in Nigeria. All 31 seats were up for election in the House of Assembly.

Abubakar Y. Suleiman from APC representing Ningi Central constituency was elected Speaker, while Danlami Kawule from PDP representing Zungur/Galambi/Miri constituency was elected Deputy Speaker.

== Results ==
The result of the election is listed below.

- Danlami Kawule from PDP won Zungur/Galambi/Miri constituency
- Abubakar Suleiman from APC won Ningi Central constituency
- Jamilu Umaru Dahiru from NNPP won Bauchi Central constituency
- Babayo Muhammad from PDP won Hardawa constituency
- Bakoji Aliyu Bobbo from PDP won Chiroma constituency
- Tijjani Mohammed Aliyu from APC won Azare/Madangala constituency
- Mohammed Musa Lumo from PDP won Lere/Bula constituency
- Kawuwa Damina from APC won Darazo constituency
- Tukur Ibrahim from APC won Toro/Jama'a constituency
- Baballe Abubakar Dambam from APC won Dambam/Dagauda/Jalam constituency
- Wanzam Mohammed from PDP won Sakwa constituency
- Yusuf Mohammed Bako from APC won Pali constituency
- Abdullahi Bala Dan from PDP won Duguri/Gwana constituency
- Musa Wakili from PDP won Bogoro constituency
- Musa Mantai Baraza from APC won Dass constituency
- Bala Abdu Rishi from APC won Lame constituency
- Yunusa Ahmed from APC won Warji constituency
- Ado Wakili from APC won Burra constituency
- Sade Sabo Bako from PDP won Sade constituency
- Gazali Abubakar from APC won Ganjuwa East constituency
- Yusuf Inuwa Dadiye from APC won Ganjuwa West constituency
- Mukhtar A. Sulaiman from APC won Katagum constituency
- Sale Mohammed from APC won Jama'are constituency
- Bala Rabilu from APC won Itas/Gadau constituency
- Hodi Jibir Bello from APC won Disina constituency
- Mu'azu Shira from APC won Shira constituency
- Dan Umma Bello from APC won Giade constituency
- Umar Yakubu from APC won Udubo constituency
- Bello Sarkin Jadori from APC won Gamawa constituency
- Abdulkadir Umar Dewu from APC won Kirfi constituency
- Ali Dan'Iya from APC won Madara/Chinade constituency
