= Nakwada Wakilli Musa =

Nigerian politician

Member of the Bauchi State House of Assembly
- Incumbent
- Assumed office 2019
- Constituency: Bogoro

Personal details
- Occupation: Politician

Nakwada Wakilli Musa is a Nigerian politician. He currently serves as the State Representatives representing Bogoro constituency at the Bauchi State House of Assembly.
