= Babayo Akuyam =

Nigerian politician

Babayo Mohammed Akuyam

Speaker of the Bauchi State House of Assembly
- In office 29 November 2023 – 7 March 2024
- Preceded by: Abubakar Y. Suleiman
- Succeeded by: Abubakar Y. Suleiman
- Constituency: Hardawa

Member of the Bauchi State House of Assembly
- Incumbent
- Assumed office 2023

Personal details
- Party: Peoples Democratic Party
- Occupation: Politician

Babayo Akuyam is a Nigerian politician. He currently serve as a member of the Bauchi State House of Assembly, representing the Hardawa Constituency. He previously served as the Speaker of the Bauchi State House of Assembly.
