= Bunu language (Nigeria) =

Kainji language spoken in Nigeria

Bunu
- Ribina
- Native to: Nigeria
- Region: Toro LGA, Bauchi State
- Native speakers: 4,000 (2004)
- Language family: Niger–Congo?: Atlantic–Congo; Benue–Congo; Kainji; East Kainji; Shammo; Bunu

Language codes
- ISO 639-3: –
- Glottolog: ribi1243

Bunu
- Person: Anorubuna
- People: Ànarubùnu
- Language: Ìbunu

Bunu or Ribina (Rebina, Rubunu) is an East Kainji language of Toro LGA, Bauchi State, Nigeria belonging to the Shammo cluster.

== Villages ==
It is spoken in the villages of:

- Rinjin Gani
- Ribina
- Pingana

== Demographics ==
Speaker estimates include:

- 2,000 speakers in 1971
- 4,000 speakers in 2004
