= Shehu Buba Umar =

Nigerian politician

Senate
- Incumbent
- Assumed office 2023
- Preceded by: Yahaya Gumau
- Constituency: Bauchi South Senatorial District

Personal details
- Born: October 1979 (age 46–47)
- Party: All Progressive Congress (APC)
- Profession: Politician, teacher, businessman

Shehu Buba Umar (born 2 October 1976) is a Nigerian politician and a senator representing Bauchi South constituency under the platform of All Progressive Congress.

== Background ==
Umar was born on 2 October 1976 in Nabordo Village of Toro Local Government Area of Bauchi State.

He attended primary school in Newo-Foron, Barikin Ladi Local Government Area of Plateau State, and secondary schools in Government Day Secondary School Baraya in Bauchi State. He holds a bachelor's degree in Adult Education from Ahmadu Bello University, Zaria, and a master's degree in Conflict Peace and Resolution Management from University of Jos.

== Early career ==
Umar started his career as a classroom teacher. He was senior special assistant to former Bauchi State Governor Malam Isa Yuguda. He was the special adviser to former Vice President Atiku Abubakar. He is the chairman of Farmers Herders Conflict Resolution Committee, Plateau State, Chairman Farmers Herders Conflict Resolution Committee to the Federal Government of Nigeria. He is a member of the World Food Economic Conference in Berlin, Germany. He is the executive director of business development for Aquawave Oil and Gas.

== Political career ==
Umar won the Bauchi South Senatorial District Election with 175,505 votes, defeating Garba Dahiru of the People Democratic Party, who received 165,727 votes, and Lawal Gumau of the NNPP, who received 3,739.

Umar is a member of the 10th National Assembly. He is the chairman of the Committee National Security and Intelligence.

== Bills and motions ==
Bills

- Cyber crime (Prohibition and Prevention) Act 2015 (Amendment) Bill
- National Security Agencies Act (Amendment) Bill, 2023
- Federal Orthopedic Hospital Management Board (Amendment) Bill, 2024
- Federal Medical Centre Act (Amendment) Bill, 2023

Motions

- Motion to Federal Government to provide about 100 CNG busses to NURTW, NARTO, RTEAN to cushion the effect of fuel subsidy removal and increase access to affordable public transportation
- Motion for the establishment of custom training school that will attract over ₦10 billion in federal investment in Bauchi South Senatorial District

== Constituency projects ==
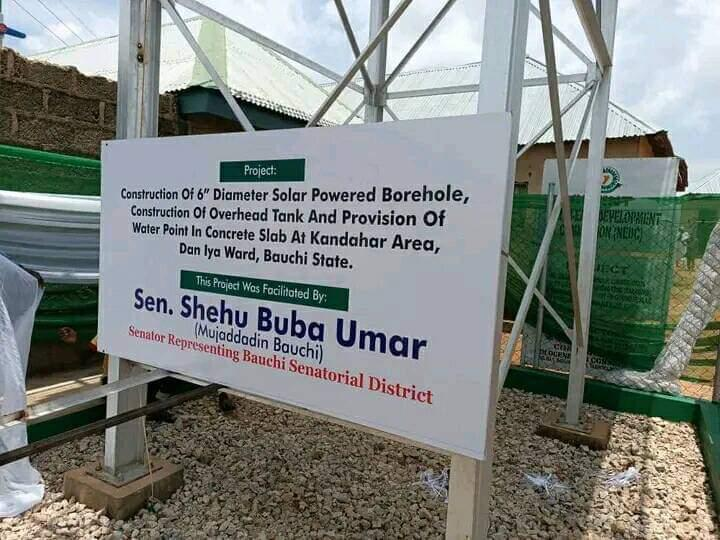
Construction of solar powered borehole, overhead tank at Kandahar Area Dan Iya Ward, Bauchi State

As Bauchi South is predominantly an agricultural community in need of development, Umar fashioned a "Masterplan of Service" development blueprint focusing on job creation, farming support, upgrading road network, rural electrification and community development.

=== Farming ===
Umar empowered 2000 youth and women farmers across the seven local government areas that comprised the Bauchi South Senatorial District, with high quality hybrid seedling, fertiliser, tractors and other farming materials for dry season support as part of part agriculture transformation to boost food production.

=== Community development ===
Between 2023 and 2025, Umar sank a total of 500 units of hand pump boreholes, 50 solar powered overhead tanks for the seven local government of Bauchi South Senatorial District.

=== Poverty eradication ===
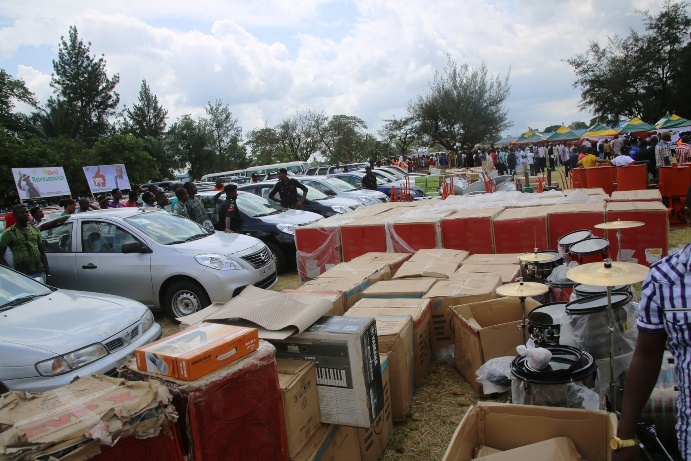
Donation of sewing machines, motorcycles, etc. to Bauchi South people

With a drive to eradicate poverty from Bauchi State, Umar donated 1000 Motorcycles, 500 tricycles and 1000 sewing machines to various communities of Bauchi South Senatorial District.

=== Road construction and electrification ===
Umar constructed over 50 kilometers of road across the urban and rural communities of the seven local government areas of his senatorial district. He also installed more than 10 transformer and streetlights across the seven local government areas of Bauchi South Senatorial District. He also constructed a 2.5 kilometer road in Zaranda town in Toro local government area of Bauchi State.

== Controversies and Public Image ==
Hassan accused Senator Shehu Buba Umar of bringing individuals linked to notorious bandit kingpin, Dogo Gide to Abuja for specialised training, which was allegedly facilitated by an aide of the senator.
