= Bicizà =

Bicizà Bicizà Mc Alley
- Village
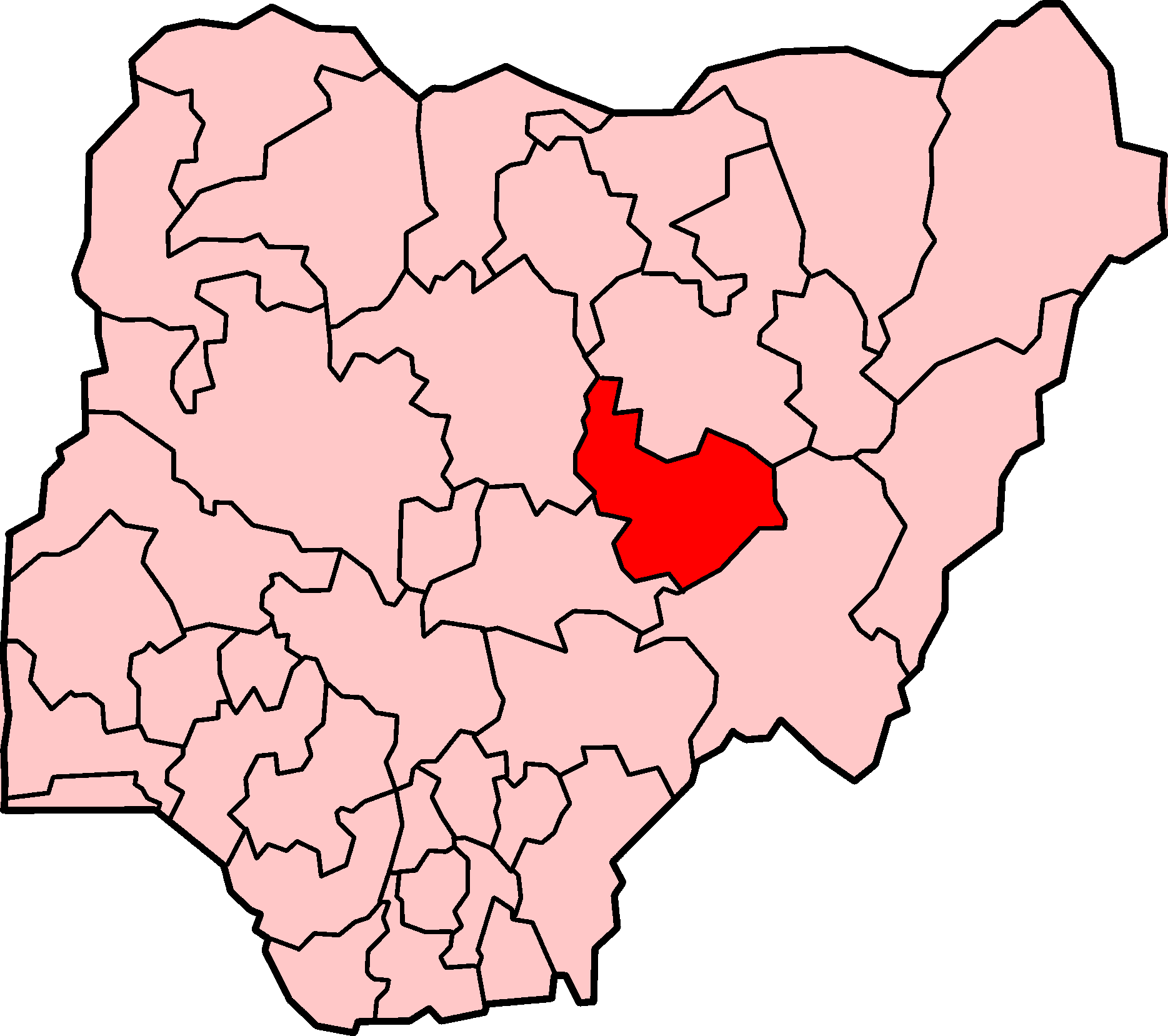

- Location within Nigeria
- Country: Nigeria
- State: Plateau State
- LGA: Bassa
- Chiefdom: Pengana
- Time zone: UTC+01:00 (WAT)
- Climate: Aw

Bicizà (Bichiza) which is today called Mc Alley or in some instances, Mista Ali is a small town in Buji district of Plateau state, Nigeria, that has boundaries with Jos North Local Government Area. It is the gateway to the State when coming from Zaria, Kaduna State and Kano State as well, in central Nigeria. Biciza (Bichiza) Means place of wasteland. It is a village to the Boze or Buji people, a dialect cluster of Kainji languages in Nigeria. Neighboring towns and villages close to Bicizà include Icizà, Zùku, Owoyoyo, Tipo, Bìdiri, Urakun, Bihol, Màlèempe, Gɔ̀rɔɔŋ, Rɛ̀woo, all in Buji district. The language of the people also forms part of the ‘Jere cluster’ and is in turn, part of the Northern Jos group of the East Kainji languages Jos spoken north of Jos town in Central Nigeria.
