= Sadique Abubakar =

20th Chief of the Air Staff (Nigeria)

Air marshal Sadique Abubakar CFR psc (+) DFS GSS fwc fdc(+) MSc
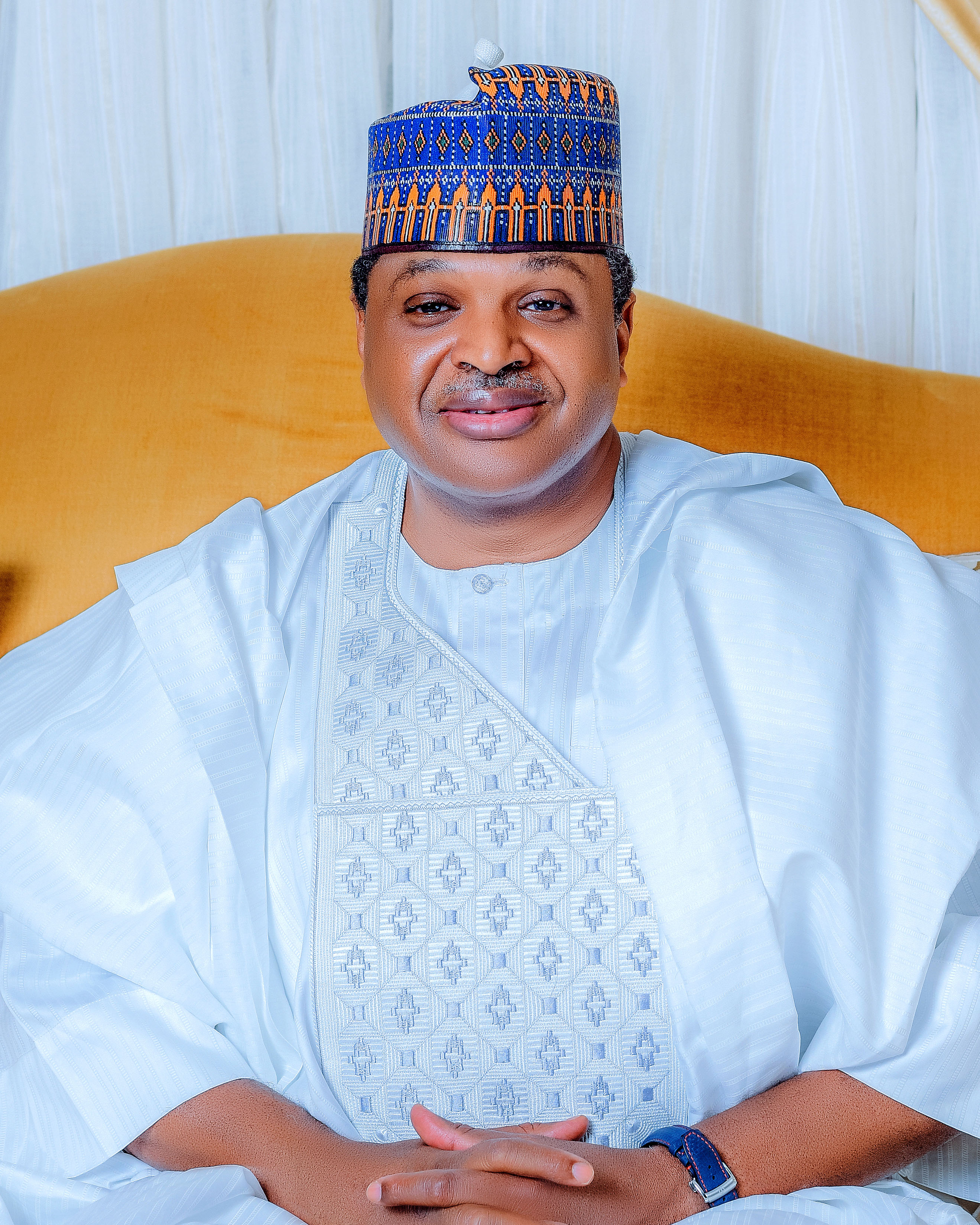
- Official portrait of the 20th Chief of the Air Staff (Nigerian Air Force)

Chief of the Air Staff
- In office 21 July 2015 – 29 January 2021
- Preceded by: Air marshal Adesola Nunayon Amosu
- Succeeded by: Air marshal Isiaka Oladayo Amao

Personal details
- Born: 8 April 1960 (age 66) Azare, Northern Region, Colonial Nigeria (now in Bauchi State, Nigeria)
- Spouse(s): Hafsat Sadique Abubakar and Sadiya Umar Farouq

Military service
- Allegiance: Nigeria
- Branch/service: Nigerian Air Force
- Years of service: 1979–2021
- Rank: Air marshal

Sadique Baba Abubakar CFR psc (+) DFS GSS fwc fdc(+) MSc (born 8 April 1960) is a retired air marshal in the Nigerian Air Force and former Chief of the Air Staff of Nigeria.

In 2023, he contested for governor of Bauchi State in the 2023 Bauchi State gubernatorial election, under the platform of the All Progressives Congress, losing to the incumbent governor Bala Mohammed of the Peoples Democratic Party.

== Background and education ==
Sadique Baba Abubakar was born on 8 April 1960, in Azare, Bauchi State. He had his primary education at St Paul's Primary School Bauchi from 1967 to 1973 and for his secondary education, he attended Government Secondary School, Bauchi. Abubakar joined the Nigerian Air Force as a member of Cadet Military Training Course (CMTC 5) in November 1979.

Abubakar has a Diploma in Public Administration and a Bachelor of Science degree (second class upper division) in political science. He also holds a Master of Science Degree in Strategic Studies from University of Ibadan. Abubakar has a Commercial Pilot License (CPL) Helicopters with Instrument Rating and has flown a total of seven aircraft types: Bulldog, Piper Warrior, Enstrom, Bell 206, BO-105, Mi-35P and Mi- 17.

== Career ==
Abubakar's previous appointments include Chief of Standards and Evaluation, NAF Headquarters, Chief of Defence Communications and Air Officer Commanding, NAF Training Command. He served as Chief of Administration, NAF Headquarters prior to his appointment as Chief of Air Staff.

== Training ==
- Directing Staff, Junior Division Armed Forces Command and Staff College.
- Staff, Senior Division Armed Forces Command and Staff College.
- Directing Staff, National Defence College.
- External Examiner at the National Defence College.
- Chairman, Participant’s Project Defence

== Awards and decorations ==
In October 2022, a Nigerian national honour of Order of the Federal Republic (CFR) was conferred on him by President Muhammadu Buhari.

- Best Cadet in Flying at Primary Flying Training Wing in 1981.
- Best All Round Cadet at Primary Flying Training Wing in 1981.
- Tactical Air Command Best Officer of the Year in 1997.
- Chief of the Air Staff’s Letter of Commendation for good leadership and prudent management of resources by Air Marshal OO Petinrin in 2009.
- Chief of the Air Staff’s Letter of Commendation for good leadership and prudent management of resources by Air Marshal MD Umar in 2011.
- Chief of the Air Staff’s Special Award from Air Marshal AS Badeh in 2013.
- Distinguished Flying Star (DFS).
- General Service Star (GSS).
- Passed Staff Course ‘Dagger’ psc(+).
- Distinguished Fellow of the National Defence College fdc(+).
- Distinguished Alumni of National Defence College.
- Distinguished Alumnus Ibadan Strategic Studies.
- Fellow Society for Peace Studies and Practice (Uni Ibadan).
