= Shammo languages =

Kainji language subgroup of Nigeria

Shammo
- Jere
- Geographic distribution: Plateau, Bauchi, and Kaduna states, Nigeria
- Linguistic classification: Niger–Congo?: Atlantic–Congo; Volta-Congo; Benue–Congo; Kainji; East Kainji; Shammo
- Subdivisions: Zele; Boze; Panawa; Sanga; Gusu; Moro; Loro; Bunu; ? Tunzu

Language codes
- ISO 639-3: –
- Glottolog: boze1240

The Shammo (Shammɔ) or Jere languages are spoken in north-central Nigeria. They form a subgroup within the East Kainji languages.

A common greeting, Shammɔ, is used in all of the Shammo languages.

== Languages ==
- Shammɔ languages
  - Zele cluster
    - Zele (Jere)
    - Boze (Buji), Panawa (Bujiyel)
  - Sanga, Gusu, Moro
  - Loro, Bunu (Ribina)
  - ? Tunzu (Duguza)
