= Shamash (disambiguation) =

Shamash was the ancient Mesopotamian sun god.

Shamash may also refer to:

== Judaism ==
- Gabbai, also known as a shamash, a person who assists in the running of synagogue services
- Shamash, a candle used to light the other eight candles of a Hanukkah menorah

== People ==
- Gerald Shamash, Baron Shamash (born 1947), British lawyer and Labour life peer
- Robert Sheldon, Baron Sheldon (1923–2020), born Isaac Ezra Shamash, British Labour politician and life peer
