= Muhammad Wakili =

Muhammad Wakili (Singham), is a Nigerian retired police officer and former Commissioner of Police in Kano State.

== Early life and education ==
Wakili hails from Gombe State and had his basic education there. He earned a Bachelor of Arts degree in Languages and Linguistics from the University of Maiduguri, Borno State. In 1986, he participated in the National Youth Service Corps scheme, and then enlisted two years later into the Nigeria Police (Force) as a cadet assistant superintendent.

== Career ==
After graduating from the university, Wakili was enlisted into the Nigeria Police Academy Wudil Kano State where he was trained and deemed fit in character and morals. On the completion of the assistant superintendent course at the academy, he was commissioned as an ASP in 1989, Wakili worked in different police commands. His first place of posting was Malumfashi in the present day Katsina State. From Malumfashi he was transferred to Tafawa Balewa LGA in Bauchi State, he served as a Divisional Police Officer and led a police team in an operation at a village called Zalanga.

Wakili worked in EFCC, other Wakili's places of work include serving as 2IC Operations in Kano, Lagos Police commands and Democratic Republic of Congo 1997 for peacekeeping operations.

He served as the commissioner of police in Kano State where his dedication to curbing crime and the prevalent abuse of hard drugs earned him the nickname Singham comparing him to the Indian movie character of that name. He retired from the Nigerian police in 2019 after serving diligently and earning a reputation as a no nonsense man of good character and indomitable will. He was appointed as a Special adviser on Security Matters by the serving governor of Gombe State (Muhammadu Inuwa Yahaya).

== Personal life ==
Wakili retired on 24 May 2019. He has a wife with 17 children and 1 grandchild.
