= 2011 Bauchi State gubernatorial election =

State election in Nigeria

- 28 April 2011
Nominee	Isa Yuguda	Yusuf Tuggar
Party	PDP	CPC
Popular vote	771,503	238,426
Governor before election
Isa Yuguda
PDP
Elected Governor
Isa Yuguda
PDP

The 2011 Bauchi State gubernatorial election was the 7th gubernatorial election of Bauchi State. Held on 28 April 2011, the People's Democratic Party nominee Isa Yuguda won the election, defeating Yusuf Tuggar of the Congress for Progressive Change.

== Results ==
A total of 12 candidates contested in the election. Isa Yuguda from the People's Democratic Party won the election, defeating Yusuf Tuggar from the Congress for Progressive Change. Valid votes was 1,273,667.

2011 Bauchi State gubernatorial election
Party	Candidate	Votes	%	±%
PDP	Isa Yuguda	771,503		
CPC	Yusuf Tuggar	238,426		
PDP hold				
