= Ado Wakili =

Nigerian politician

Ado Wakili was a Nigerian politician. He served as the State Representative for the Burra constituency in the Bauchi State House of Assembly. He died in June 2023, just three days before the completion of his tenure.
