= Abubakar Y. Suleiman =

Speaker of the Bauchi State House of Assembly, Nigeria

Abubakar Y Suleiman
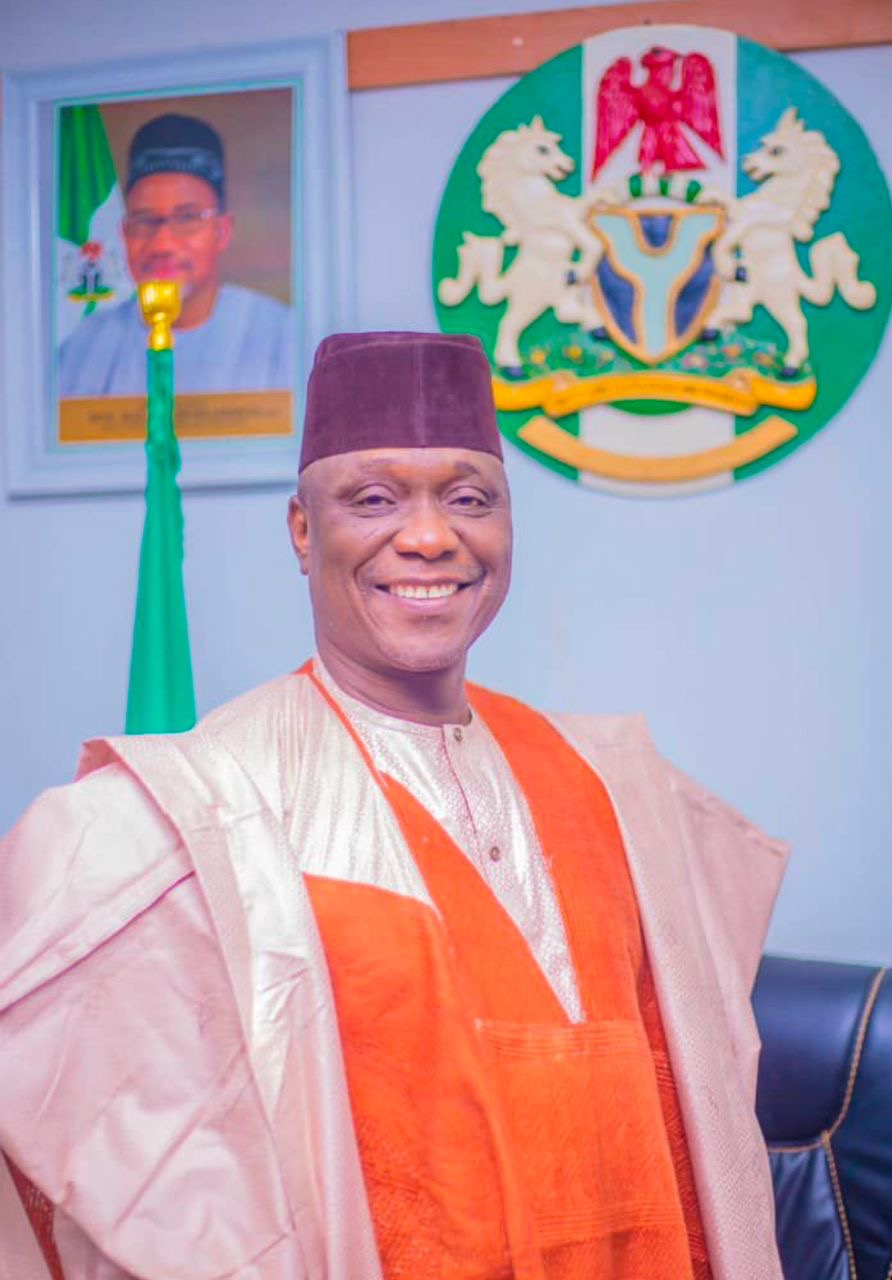

Personal details
- Party: APC
- Occupation: Politician

Abubakar Y Suleiman is a Nigerian politician who was elected speaker of the 9th Bauchi State House of Assembly in 2019. Suleiman, a member of the APC representing, Ningi State constituency was controversially elected speaker of the house by 11 of the 31 members of the assembly. Of the 11 members that elected Suleiman speaker, 8 were members of the People's Democratic Party while 3 were renegade members of the majority All Progressives Congress. Eighteen members of the majority party (APC) in the house were denied access to the assembly complex during the election. This group conducted its own election in a different location and produced the former speaker of the 8th assembly Kawuwa Damina who was running for re-election for the 9th assembly speaker. The crisis was later resolved.

In November 2019, Suleiman was elected Chairman of the Conference of Speakers of the State Legislatures of the Northeast region.
