= Laraba Gambo Abdullahi =

Nigerian chemist and administrator

Laraba Gambo Abdullahi (born 1951) is a Nigerian chemist and administrator who was Vice-chancellor of the University of Abuja from 1999 to 2004. Abdullahi has held many political appointments during her career. She was recently the director of the National Board for Technology Incubation, a government tool to promote commercialization of research ideas generated by and in Nigerian universities.

== Early life and education ==
Abdullahi was born in Azare, Bauchi State, her father was a district officer in Katagum Native Authority. She started education early as a young Muslim girl in Azare, she studied at Provincial Girls' College, Bauchi, and in 1963, she proceeded to Queen Elizabeth School, Ilorin where she completed her secondary education in 1969. In 1970, she was accepted to study biochemistry at the Ahmadu Bello University, Zaria, a year later, she married Umar Lawal when she was still an undergraduate. Abdullahi then completed her studies in 1974. In 1976, she joined University of Maiduguri as an assistant lecturer in chemistry.

In 1978, she traveled to U.K. to study analytical chemistry and earned her doctorate at the Loughborough University of Technology in 1984. Abdullahi returned to Nigeria and accepted the position of a lecturer at the University of Maiduguri. In 1985, after a few years of academic work, she was appointed state commissioner for information, then education and commerce and industry followed.

== Career ==
After serving Bauchi state government for five years, Abdullahi returned to academic. In December 1990, she got an academic appointment at University of Abuja and between 1991 - 1998 she was director of the college's remedial and general studies program. Between 1998 and 1999, she served as the Nigerian Minister of Women Affairs and Social Development.

In 1999, Abdullahi was appointed Vice Chancellor of the University of Abuja. She was in this position until the end of her tenure in 2004.

In 2005 Abdullahi was appointed as the Director-General/Chief Executive Officer of the National Board for Technology Incubation (NBTI), She left the office in 2013.

Abdullahi at the moment, serving as the North East Zone's representative on the Chemical Society of Nigeria's (CSN) central board of trustees.

Abdullahi, an Officer of the Order of the Niger (OON) and holder of the National Merit Award

Abdullahi belongs to a number of professional organizations, including the following:

- Fellow of the chemical society of Nigeria (FCSN);
- Member Royal Society of Chemistry (MRSC);
- Women’s Right Advancement and Protection Alternative (WRAPA).
