= Musa Babayo =

Nigerian banker, businessman, politician (born 1957)

Dr Musa Babayo

Chairman Board of Trustees TETFund
- In office 13 September 2013 – 16 July 2015

National Secretary of the PDP National Working Committee
- In office March 2012 – 2015

Chairman, ETF board
- In office 2008–2012

Personal details
- Born: Musa Babayo; 21 March 1957 (age 69) Azare, Bauchi State
- Party: All Progressives Congress

Musa Babayo (born 21 March 1957) is a Nigerian banker, businessman, politician, and elder states-man who was the National Secretary of the PDP National Working Committee from 2012 to 2015 prior to joining the All Progressives Congress (APC) on 15 October 2015. He was the Deputy National Secretary of the party from 2008 to 2011 before later becoming the National Secretary.

== Early life and education ==
Musa was born and raised in Azare, Katagum local government, Bauchi state. He attended the Nasarawa West Primary School, Azare, 1965–1972 then to Katagum Government Secondary school, Azare from 1972 to 1976. He further attended Ahmadu Bello University, Zaria where he earned Bachelor of Science in administration, banking and finance. He went to Manchester Business School, UK for Senior Bankers course, June 1993, and University of Wales Institute of Science and Technology (UWIST), UK for master's degree in management and technology, 1984.

In 2001, he got a PhD at the University of Abuja, FCT, Nigeria.

== Professional career ==
In between his political career, Babayo has held different public and private offices. As a senior civil servant, he was the Chairman of the Education Trust Fund and the chairman Board of Trustees TETFund, an appointment that was structured to last for a term of four years although the board was dissolved 2 years before the termination of his tenure on 16 July 2015.

=== TETFund ===
As the chairman of the Tertiary Education Trust Fund (TETFund), Babayo managed the transition that led to the repeal of the 1998 Tax Act and its replacement with the TetFund Establishment Act of July 2011. In 2013, the institution admitted National Open University of Nigeria (NOUN), as a beneficiary of the fund, and relocation of the university from Lagos to its permanent site in Abuja through the provision of the critical educational infrastructure.

In 2015, he introduced the capacity building programme known as Academic Staff Training and Development (ASTD) where over 26,000 academics were covered on the programme pursuing MSc's and PhD's. As at then, the ASTD was known as the biggest capacity building programme funded by a public treasury in the world.

During his chairmanship, Babayo introduced conference attendance for Tertiary Institutions academics and over 30,000 academics were recorded to have benefitted from the programme.

He started the introduction of the Almajiri model schools (Boarding and Day) during the former president of Nigeria, Goodluck Ebele Jonathan's regime in 19 Northern states and Edo. 100 of such schools were built and functioning with full pupils’ enrolments. An allocation of N2B was made for the project on take-off in 2010.

Other projects of the TETFund were carried out before the end of his tenure.

=== Allied Bank of Nigeria Plc (1982– 1996) ===
As a banker, he was the regional manager of the Allied Bank in 1982 to 1996. He was responsible for the business development of the branches in the unit, with special focus on profit improvement and cost reduction; setting targets for the branches with a view to enhance effectiveness, for better services delivery to the customers were equally part of the overall mandate.

=== Inland Bank Nigeria. Ltd (April–July), 1990 ===
Babayo moved to the Inland Bank as the GM and CEO in 1990 and was generally responsible for setting the direction of the company's growth in all areas of the Bank, which includes Credit and Risk Assets Management, Human Resources Management, Administration, Branches location strategies, profit improvement, and general corporate planning and development amongst others.

== Political career ==
Babayo was among the founding members of the People's Democratic Party before joining the All Progressives Congress at the Katagum local government area, Bauchi state on 15 October 2015. During his PDP days, Babayo was a member of the PDP Board of Trustees for years before appointed as the Deputy National Secretary of the PDP working committee and subsequently as the National Secretary of the party.

== Publication ==
He is the author of the book titled The Economic Diplomacy and Nigeria's Foreign Policy that was first published in 2015.

== Honour and recognition ==
Babayo was conferred with the title of Talban Katagum by the emir of Bauchi Emirate, Suleiman Adamu, on 13 January 1996. He was also the recipient of the Most Outstanding Public Officer Award from the Independent Service Delivery Monitoring Group (ISDMG) in 2014.

== See also ==
- List of Nigerians
- People's Democratic Party
- All Progressives Congress
- Bamanga Tukur
