= Yakubu Shehu Abdullahi =

Nigerian politician

Yakubu Shehu Abdullahi (born 23 March 1975) is a Nigerian politician from Bauchi State, who represented Bauchi Federal Constituency in the House of Representatives from 2019 to 2023.

After defecting to the All Progressive Congress (APC) and later to the New Nigeria People's Party (NNPP) in a bid to secure a senatorial ticket, Abdullahi lost to Lawal Yahaya Gumau.

In 2023 Abdullahi was declared wanted by the Nigerian Police Force following a list of criminal offenses.
