= Boze language =

East Kainji language of Nigeria

Boze
- Buji
- Native to: Nigeria
- Region: Jos Plateau
- Language family: Niger–Congo?: Atlantic–Congo; Benue–Congo; Kainji; East Kainji; Shammo; Boze

Language codes
- ISO 639-3: –
- Glottolog: buji1242

Boze
- Person: unaBoze
- People: anaBoze
- Language: εBoze

Gorong
- Person: unεGorong (unaGorong)
- People: anεGorong (anaGorong)
- Language: εGorong

Firu
- Person: unoFiru
- People: ànoFíru
- Language: εFiru

Boze, also rendered Buji, is an East Kainji language of Nigeria belonging to the Shammo cluster. Boze is spoken in a contiguous area Bicizà, directly to the north of Jos city in Plateau State, Nigeria.

Dialects include Boze, Gorong, and Firu.

== Distribution ==
Boze (ɛBoze), also called Buji, is spoken in many villages to the west and northwest of Jos.

Below are village names organized by dialect, with modern names given in parentheses.

Boze dialect

- Bīntīrí
- Bìsɔ̄ (Rùmáná)
- Bɛ̄hɔ̄lɛ̄
- Gbàndāŋ
- Ɔ̀bɛ̀nɛ̀ àkùrá (Màirágá)
- Ɔ̀pɛ̄ɛ̀gɔ̄
- Ɔ̀tɔ̀ɔ̀tùsū (Rùmfán Gwómnà)
- Rībàmbōzē
- Rīdāpɔ̄
- Tìpɔ́ɔ̀ táázà (ādònkòròŋ)
- Tìpɔ́ɔ̀ tādīzì (Kwánà)
- Tūūmū (Sə́rə́rí)
- Ūgbàrà
- Ùkúū

Gorong dialect

- Màlēēmpē (Jéjìn Fílí)
- Ɔ̄wɔ̀ɔ̀yɔ̄ɔ̄yɔ̀
- Rɛ̀shɔ́kɔ̄
- Rɛ̀tɛ̄ɛ̄ rūjà (Ùrɛ̀kùn)
- Rɛ̀wɔ̄ɔ̄ (Ràfín Gwázá)
- Úlìndāŋ

Firu dialect

- Tūmbàkīrì (Kìrāŋ̄gō)
- Ùkwə̀shì
- Zə̀ə̀lə̀kì (Gìndáu)

Mixed

- Zùùkū (NNPC Depot)

Others

- Ɛ̀fīīrù (Kòòfá)
- Īcīzā
- Īncā (Táshà)
- Ɔ̀bɛ̀nɛ̀ (Sə́rə́rí)

== Phonology ==
=== Consonants ===
		Labial	Alveolar	Post-alv./ Palatal	Velar	Labio- velar	Glottal
Nasal		m	n	ɲ	ŋ		
Plosive/ Affricate	voiceless	p	t	t͡ʃ	k	k͡p	
Plosive/ Affricate	voiced	b	d	d͡ʒ	ɡ	ɡ͡b	
Fricative	voiceless	f	s	ʃ			h
Fricative	voiced	v	z	ʒ			
Trill			r				
Lateral			l				
Approximant				j		w	

- Sounds /b, k, ɡ/ may also be both labialized [bʷ, kʷ, ɡʷ] and palatalized [bʲ, kʲ, ɡʲ].
- Labial-velar sounds /k͡p, ɡ͡b/ may also be heard in free variation with labialized sounds [kʷ, ɡʷ].

=== Vowels ===
	Front	Central	Back
High	i iː		u uː
High-mid	e eː	ə əː	o oː
Low-mid	ɛ ɛː	ə əː	ɔ ɔː
Low		a aː	
