= Halliru Dauda Jika =

Nigerian senator

Jika Halliru Dauda

House of Representatives
- In office 2015–2019

Senator Bauchi Central Bauchi State
- In office 2019–2023
- Preceded by: Isah Hamma Misau
- Succeeded by: Abdul Ahmed Ningi

Personal details
- Born: 1976 (age 49–50)
- Party: All Progressives Congress (APC)
- Profession: Politician

Halliru Dauda Jika was born in 1976 in Bauchi State, Nigeria. He is a businessman and a politician. He was once a member and shortly the speaker of Bauchi State house of assembly, member house of representatives and former senate member representing Bauchi Central . He is also known as Dokaji.

== Early life and education ==
Jika was born on 1976 in Bauchi State, Nigeria. went to Sardauna Memorial College in Kaduna, Kaduna State and graduated in 1999. He then moved to Kaduna Polytechnic to study Civil Engineering and graduate in 2003.

== Political career ==
Jika was elected as a representative of Darazo and Ganjuwa Constituency in the Federal House of Representatives and served two term as a representative, first term between 2007 and 2011 and second term between 2011 and 2015. In the 2019 general election, he was elected senator for Bauchi Central under the flag of the APC.

== Personal life ==
Jika is a Muslim. He is married with children.Kelvin Emmanuel
