= 2019 Nigerian Senate elections in Bauchi State =

2019 Nigerian Senate election in Bauchi State

The 2019 Nigerian Senate election in Bauchi State was held on February 23, 2019, to elect members of the Nigerian Senate to represent Bauchi State. Lawal Yahaya Gumau representing Bauchi South, Jika Dauda Halliru representing Bauchi Central and Adamu Muhammad Bulkachuwa representing Bauchi North all won on the platform of All Progressives Congress.

== Overview ==
Affiliation	Party		Total
Affiliation	PDP	APC	Total
Before Election	0	3	3
After Election	0	3	3

== Summary ==
District	Incumbent	Party	Elected Senator	Party
Bauchi South	Lawal Yahaya Gumau	APC	Lawal Yahaya Gumau	APC
Bauchi Central	Isah Misau	APC	Halliru Dauda Jika	APC
Bauchi North	Suleiman Nazif	APC	Adamu Bulkachuwa	APC

== Results ==
=== Bauchi South ===
A total of 18 candidates registered with the Independent National Electoral Commission to contest in the election. APC candidate Lawal Yahaya Gumau won the election, defeating PDP candidate, Dahiru Garba and 16 other party candidates. Gumau scored 250,725 votes, while PDP candidate Garba scored 175,527 votes.

2019 Nigerian Senate election in Bauchi State
Party	Candidate	Votes	%
APC	Lawal Yahaya Gumau	250,725	
PDP	Dahiru Garba	175,527	
Others			
Total votes		482,958	100%
APC hold			

=== Bauchi Central ===
A total of 15 candidates registered with the Independent National Electoral Commission to contest in the election. APC candidate Halliru Dauda Jika won the election, defeating PDP candidate Hammah Issah and 13 other party candidates. Jika pulled 128,871 votes, while PDP candidate Issah scored 57,069.

2019 Nigerian Senate election in Bauchi State
Party	Candidate	Votes	%
APC	Halliru Dauda Jika	128,871	
PDP	Hammah Issah	57,069	
Others			
Total votes		258,896	100%
APC hold			

=== Bauchi North ===
A total of 11 candidates registered with the Independent National Electoral Commission to contest in the election. APC candidate Adamu Bulkachuwa won the election, defeating PDP candidate and incumbent, Suleiman Nazif. Bulkachuwa pulled 110,631 votes while his closest rival Mustapha Farouk of NNRP pulled 92,140 votes.

2019 Nigerian Senate election in Bauchi State
Party	Candidate	Votes	%
APC	Adamu Bulkachuwa	110,631	
PDP	Suleiman Nazif	56,379	
Others			
Total votes		167,228	100%
APC hold			
