= Bauchi State House of Assembly =

Legislative arm of the government of Bauchi State of Nigeria

The Bauchi State House of Assembly is the legislative arm of the government of Bauchi State in Nigeria. It is a unicameral legislature having 31 members elected from the 20 local government areas in the state known as state constituencies. Local government areas with considerably larger populations are delineated into two constituencies to give equal representation. This makes the number of legislators in the Bauchi State House of Assembly 31.

The fundamental functions of the assembly are to enact new laws, amend or repeal existing laws and oversight of the executive. Members of the assembly are elected for a term of four years concurrent with federal legislators (Senate and House of Representatives). The state assembly convenes three times a week (Tuesdays, Wednesdays and Thursdays) in the assembly complex within the state capital, Bauchi.

The leaders of Bauchi State House of Assembly are Abubakar Y. Suleiman (speaker) and Danlami Kawule (deputy speaker).
