= Toro, Nigeria =

- City and LGA
- Interactive map of Toro, Nigeria
- Country: Nigeria
- State: Bauchi State

Government
  - Local Government Chairman: Ibrahim Abubakar Dembo

Area
  - Total: 6,705 km^{2} (2,589 sq mi)

Population (2022 est)
  - Total: 617,800
  - Density: 92.14/km^{2} (238.6/sq mi)
- Time zone: UTC+1 (WAT)
- 3-digit postal code prefix: 740

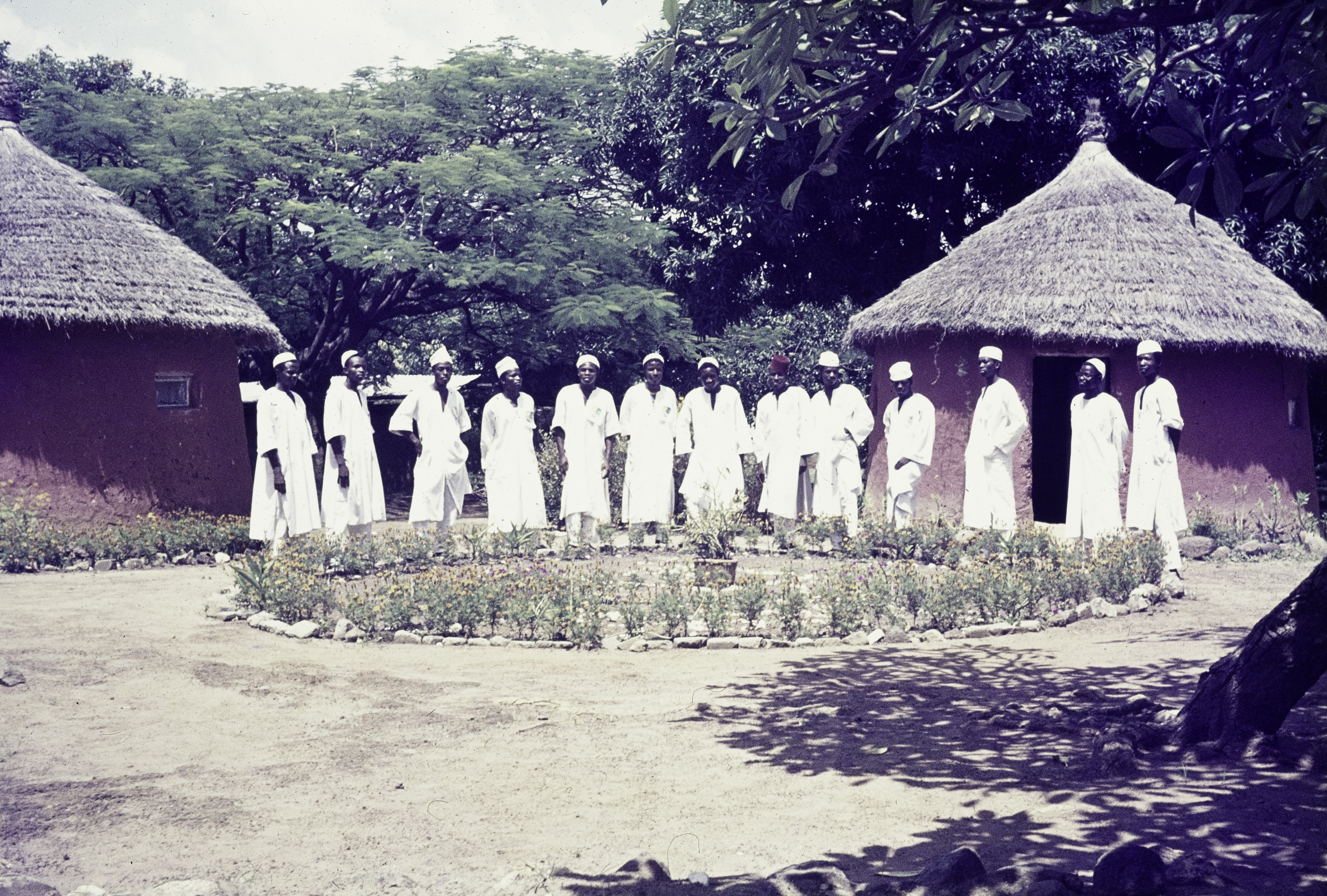
Teachers college Toro, 1970–1973. Students are waiting for the inspection of their huts (the pink "house") by the director.

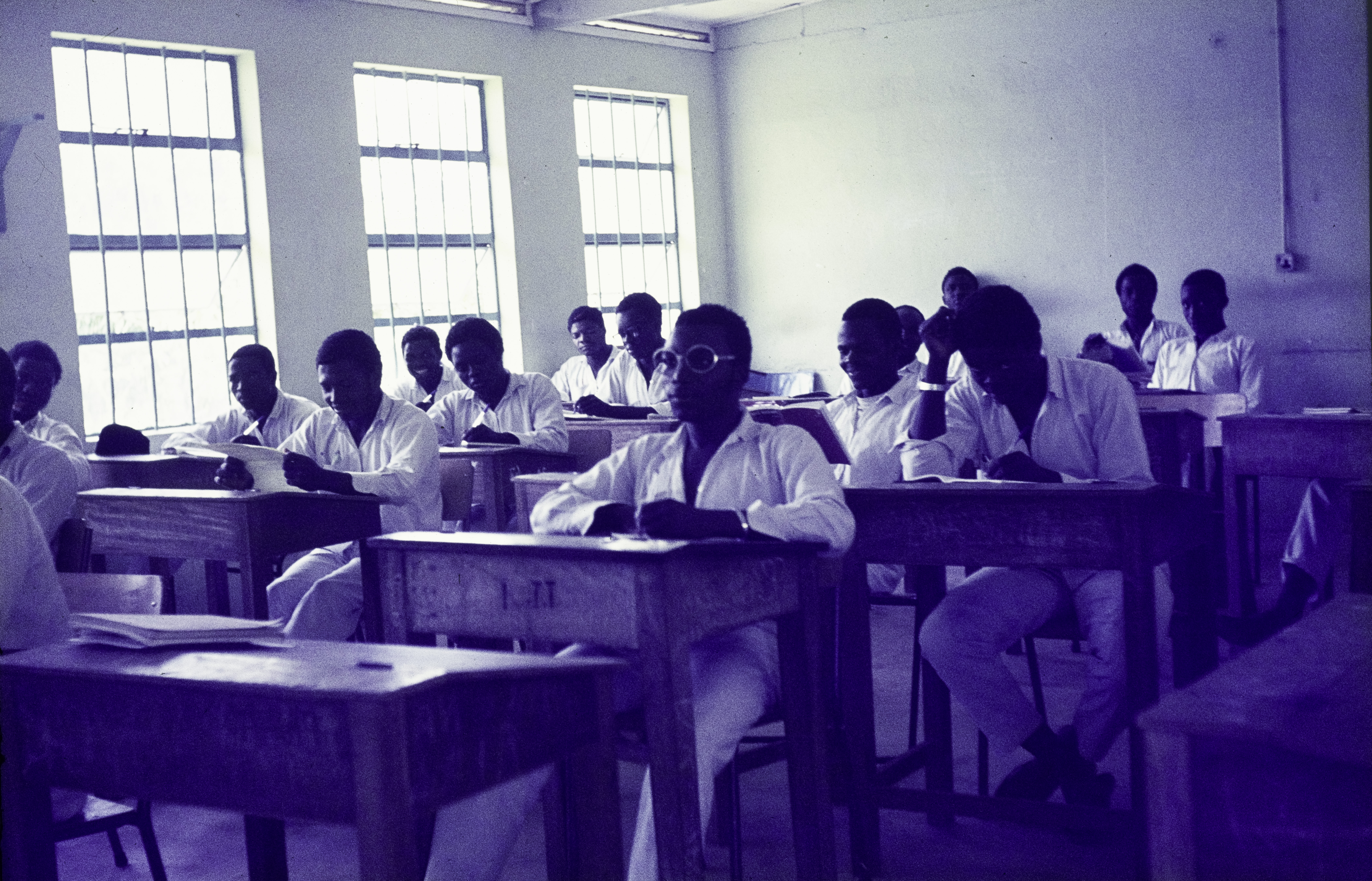
Teachers college Toro, 1970–1973. An African history class.

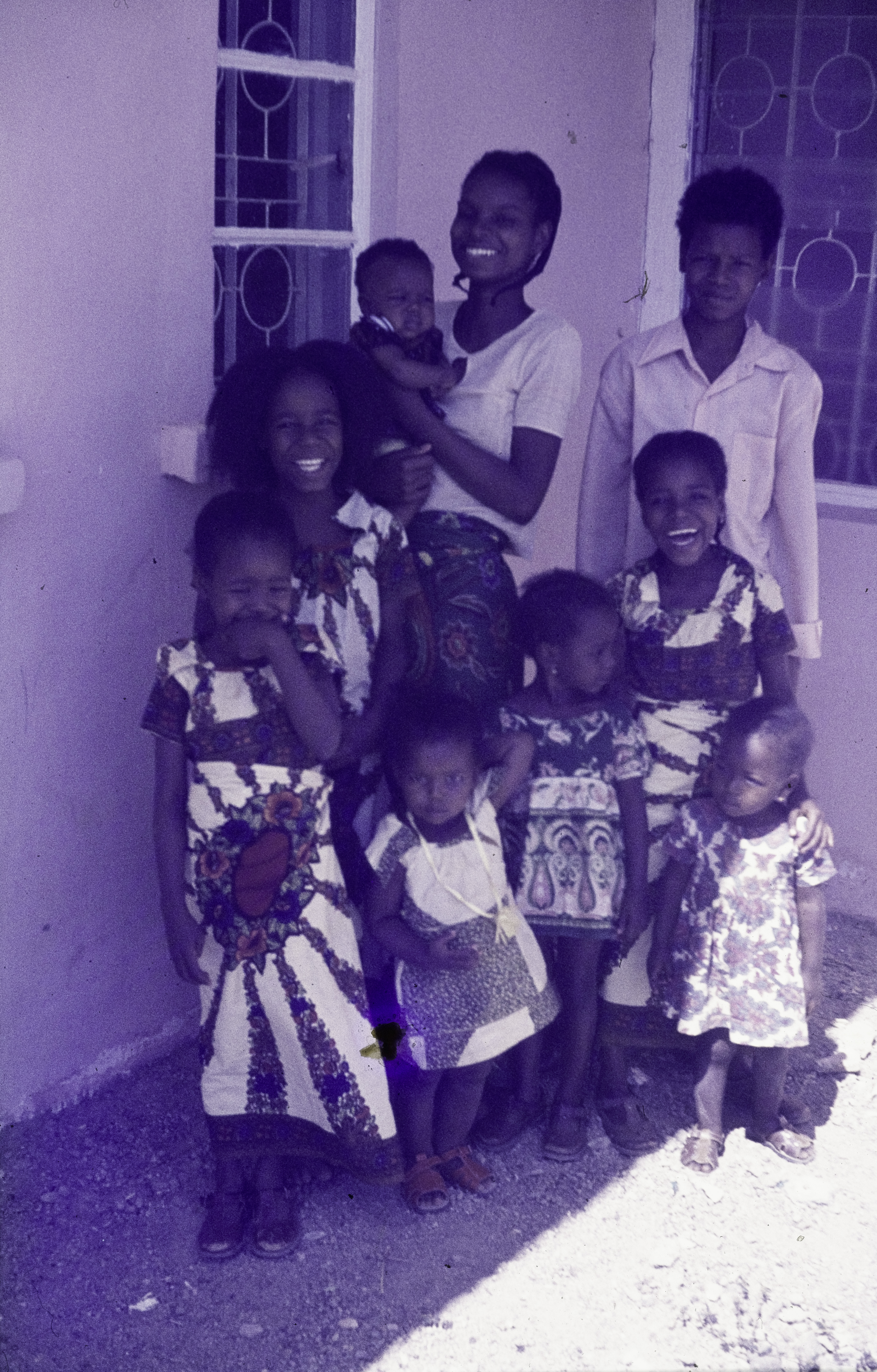
Teacher of Teachers college Toro with her children, 1970–1973.

Toro is a city and Local Government Area of Bauchi State, Nigeria. The local government has three districts: Toro, Jama'a and Lame district.The local government is the largest local government in Nigeria and west Africa in particular and is crossed by the Bunga River. It has an area of 6,705 square kilometres (2,589 square miles) and a population of 350,404 at the 2006 census. The postal code of the area is 740.

== People and languages ==
Toro local government is rich in culture and has diverse ethnic groups such as Afizere, Anarubunu (Ribina), Duguza, Fulani, Kaiwari amongst others. However, Fulfulde is the major languages spoken by the people of the area (especially in the town of Toro).

== Notable people ==
- Honorable Umar Muda Lawal member representing Toro Federal Constituency Bauchi State at the 9th Assembly.
- Justice Danladi Umar a Nigerian jurist^{[1]} from Bauchi State and the incumbent Chairman of the Code Of Conduct Tribunal (CCT) of Nigeria is from the Toro local government.
- Mahmood Yakubu, academic, educated at Government Teachers College, Toro
- Barr Yusuf Ibrahim Zailani a lawyer and critic, He was a member Federal House of Representatives, former Chairman NIMASA, and former Senatorial and Gubernatorial aspirant.

== Climate ==
With an average yearly temperature of 29.87 °C (85.77 °F), 88.52 millimetres (3.485 in) of precipitation, and 119.3 rainy days, Toro generally has a tropical wet and dry climate.
