= WJI =

WJI or wji may refer to:

- Warji language (ISO 639-3: wji), an Afro-Asiatic language spoken in Bauchi State, Nigeria
- Wuji County (Division code: WJI), a county of Hebei Province, North China
