= PQA =

PQA or pqa may refer to:

- Port Qasim Authority
- The Pauline Quirke Academy
- pqa, the ISO 639-3 code for Paʼa language, Bauchi State, Nigeria
