= Mburku language =

Afro-Asiatic language spoken in Nigeria

Mburku
- Native to: Nigeria
- Region: Bauchi State
- Native speakers: (12,000 cited 2000)
- Language family: Afro-Asiatic: Chadic; West Chadic; Bade–Warji; Warji (B.2); Mburku

Language codes
- ISO 639-3: bbt
- Glottolog: mbur1239

Mburku or Burku is an Afro-Asiatic language belonging to the West-Chadic subgroup of the Chadic languages. It is estimated to be spoken by 7,000-10,000 people in Miya District of Ganjuwa LGA, Bauchi State, Nigeria. Although it is still referred to as Mburku in academic sources such as Glottolog, the speakers prefer their language be called Burku. Ethnologue classifies Burku as a stable language not in danger of extinction.

== Phonology ==
Pulmonic Consonant Phonemes
	Bilabial	Labiodental	Alveolar	Post-alveolar	Palatal	Velar	Pharyngeal	Glottal
Nasal	m		n			ŋ		
Plosive	p b		t d			k g		ʔ
Fricative		f v	s z	ʃ				h
Affricate			ts	t͡ʃ d͡ʒ				
Approximant					j	w		
Lateral Approximant			l					
Rhotic			ɹ					
