= Kariya language =

Afroasiatic language of Nigeria

Kariya
- Vìnà Hə̀
- Native to: Nigeria
- Region: Ganjuwa LGA, Bauchi State
- Native speakers: (2,000 cited 1995)
- Language family: Afro-Asiatic: Chadic; West Chadic; Bade–Warji; Warji (B.2); Kariya

Language codes
- ISO 639-3: kil
- Glottolog: kari1316
- ELP: Kariya

- People: Wììhə́
- Language: Vìnà Hə̀

Kariya or Vinahə (Vìnà Hə̀), is an Afroasiatic language spoken in a cluster of villages near the Stone Age archaeological site of Kariya Wuro in Ganjuwa LGA, Bauchi State, Nigeria. The ethnic group is known as Wììhə́.

The Wiihə people have a highly rich and complex ritual culture that includes elaborate masquerades, a circumcision ceremony known as sár, a ritual calendar, and so on.

== Distribution ==
Speakers live in the two main settlements of Kariya Gyada and Tulu. There are also speakers in the nearby villages of Sabon Kariya and Sabon Tulu. The settlement of Dutsen Giwa used to have Vinahə speakers, but it is now Hausa-speaking.

== Clans ==
Wiihə clans and their respective founders and shrines:

Clan	Founder	Shrine
Vàràyá	Tákúshìyà	uses the Kúlkùl shrine
Kúlkùl	Yàkáù	Jambula
Njálgá	Zàmànì	incorporated into Kàryà
Kàryà	Ààyà	Faɗuwan
Wèèmà	Gwàlàbà	Dunguzun
Iìrwá	Jàngàlá	incorporated into Vàràyá
