= Siri language =

Endangered Afro-Asiatic language of Nigeria

Siri
- Native to: Nigeria
- Region: Bauchi State
- Ethnicity: 3,800 (2006)
- Native speakers: (undated figure of older adults only)
- Language family: Afro-Asiatic: Chadic; West Chadic; B; B.2; Siri

Language codes
- ISO 639-3: sir
- Glottolog: siri1278
- ELP: Siri

Siri (Sirawa) is a highly endangered Afro-Asiatic language spoken in Bauchi State in Nigeria.
