= North Bauchi languages =

North Bauchi
- Warji; B.2 West Chadic
- Geographic distribution: Darazo and Ningi LGAs, Bauchi State, Nigeria
- Linguistic classification: Afro-Asiatic: Chadic; West Chadic; North Bauchi
- Proto-language: Proto-North Bauchi

Language codes
- Glottolog: west2712
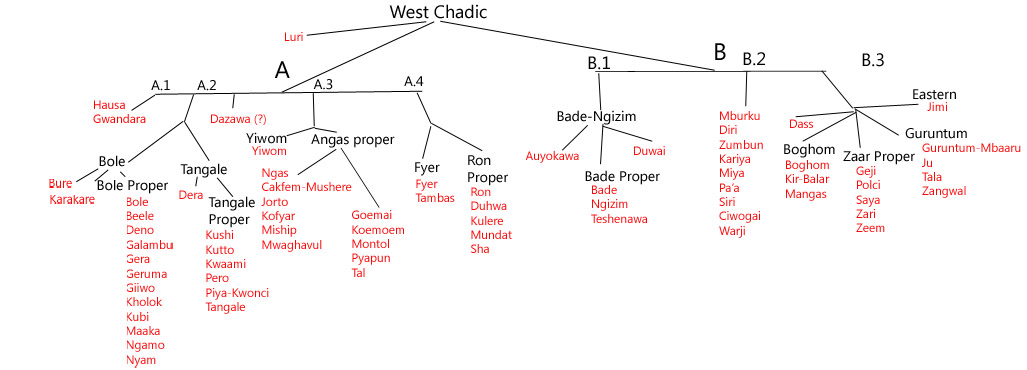
- West Chadic per Newman (1977)

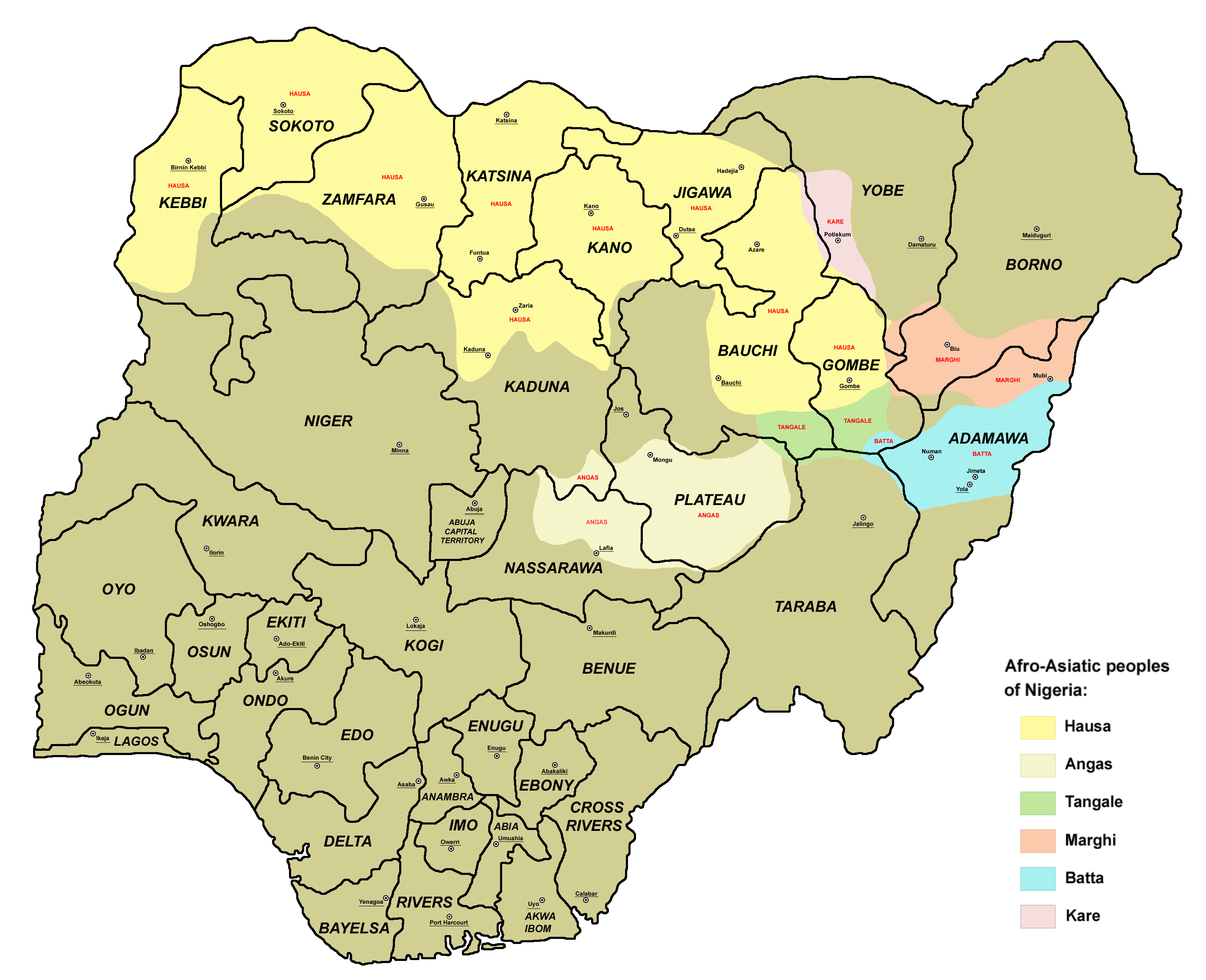
Main Chadic-speaking peoples in Nigeria

The North Bauchi languages (also called the B.2 West Chadic or Warji languages) are a branch of West Chadic languages that are spoken in Bauchi State, northern Nigeria.

An extensive survey of the North Bauchi (Warji) languages had been done by Skinner (1977).

Culturally, North Bauchi language speakers are unique for their chestharp, a fusion of the arched harp with the chest bow.

== Languages ==
Below is a comprehensive list of North Bauchi language names, populations, and locations from Blench (2019).

| Language | Cluster | Dialects | Alternate spellings | Own name for language | Endonym(s) | Other names (based on location) | Other names for language | Exonym(s) | Speakers | Location(s) |
|---|---|---|---|---|---|---|---|---|---|---|
| Ciwogai | | | Tsagu | | | | Sago, Tsaganci | | 3,000 (1977 Skinner) | Bauchi State, Ningi and Darazo LGAs |
| Diri | | | Diriya, Dirya | Sago, Tsagu | | | Diryanci | Buwane, Diryawa | 3,750 (LA 1971) | Bauchi State, Ningi and Darazo LGAs |
| Kariya | | Two dialects | Kauyawa, Keriya | Vinahә | Wihә | | | Lipkawa (see also Mburku) | 2,200 (LA 1971); 3,000 (1977 Skinner) | Bauchi State, Darazo LGA. At Kariya Wuro, 30 S.E. of Ningi. |
| Paʼa | | | Paha, Afa | FuCaka | sg. FuCiki, pl. Foni | | Paʼanci | Faʼawa, Afawa | 8,500 (LA 1971); 20,000 (Skinner, 1977) | Bauchi State, Ningi and Darazo LGAs |
| Siri | | | | Siri | | | Siryanci | | 2,000 (LA 1971); 3,000 (1977 Skinner) | Bauchi State, Darazo and Ningi LGAs |
| Warji | | Gala (?) | | Sәrzakwai, Sirzakwai | | | Sar | Sarawa | 28,000 (LA 1971); 50,000 (Skinner, 1977) | Bauchi State, Darazo LGA, Ganjuwa district, and Ningi LGA, Warji district; Jigawa State, Birnin Kudu LGA |
| Mburku | | | Barko, Barke | Vә Mvәran | | | Mburkanci | Burkunawa, Lipkawa (see also Kariya) | 210 (1949–50); 4,000 (1977 Skinner) | Bauchi State, Darazo LGA |
| Miya | | | Muya | | Vәne Mi | | | Miyawa | 5,200 (LA 1971) | Bauchi State, Darazo LGA, Ganjuwa district. Miya town and associated hamlets |
| Zumbun | | Wudufu (possible dialect) | Jimbin | Vina Zumbun | | | | | 1,500 (LA 1971) | Bauchi State, Darazo LGA |

The extinct Ajawa has been also assigned to the group.

== Reconstruction ==
Proto-North Bauchi
- Proto-Warji
- Reconstruction of: North Bauchi languages

Proto-North Bauchi (Proto-Warji) quasi-reconstructions by Roger Blench (2012):

Trees

| Scientific name | English name | Proto-North Bauchi |
|---|---|---|
| Faidherbia albida | whitethorn | #atasay |
| Acacia sieberiana | paperbark acacia | #malaliya |
| Khaya senegalensis | African mahogany | #kwamay |
| Zizyphus sp. | jujube | #akwaya |
| Ficus sp. | fig | #tirini |
| Bombax buonopozense | silk cotton | #zəŋgwa |

Antelopes

| Scientific name | English name | Proto-North Bauchi |
|---|---|---|
| Tragelaphus scriptus | bushbuck | #badakəla |
| Gazella rufifrons | red-fronted gazelle | #tambəra |
| Alcelaphus buselaphus | hartebeest | #zəmakwara |
| Ourebia ourebi | oribi | #ndagway |
| Redunca redunca | reedbuck | #gəlafi |

Crops

| Scientific name | English name | Proto-North Bauchi |
|---|---|---|
| Vigna subterranea | Bambara groundnut | #azuwey |
| Sorghum bicolor | guinea corn | #ʒuna |
| Pennisetum typhoideum | millet (gero) | #gyəla |
| Pennisetum typhoideum | millet (maiwa) | #marday |
| Abelmoschus esculentus | okra | #tagway |
| Solanum spp. | garden egg | #akintə |

Livestock

| English name | Proto-North Bauchi |
|---|---|
| chicken | #ɬərkəyi |
| cow | #yəruwa |
| he-goat | #aʧikyə |
| sheep | #tumakway |

Liquids

| English name | Proto-North Bauchi |
|---|---|
| beer | #təɬana |
| honey | #suƙwana |
| oil | #ʃivəna |
