= TGD =

TGD or tgd may refer to:

- Tuple-generating dependency, a certain kind of constraint on a relational database
- TGD, the IATA code for Podgorica Airport, Golubovci, Montenegro
- tgd, the ISO 639-3 code for Ciwogai language, Nigeria
- an acronym for an animated web series The Gaslight District
- The Good Dinosaur, a 2015 animated film
