= Bauchi State University =

University in Bauchi State, Nigeria

Coordinates: 11.82790°N 10.16387°E

Sa'adu Zungur University Bauchi State, Nigeria.
- SAZU
- Main entrance of the Bauchi State University, Bauchi Campus
- Motto: Ilimi Tushen Cigaba
- Motto in English: "Knowledge is the Foundation of Progress"
- Type: Public
- Established: 2011
- Vice-Chancellor: Fatima Tahir
- Students: 21,180
- Location: Gadau, with other campuses in Misau, and Bauchi, Bauchi State, Nigeria
- Website: sazu.edu.ng

Sa'adu Zungur University Bauchi State ( SAZU ) (formerly Bauchi State University ) is a state-owned university located in Bauchi State, Nigeria. Its main campus is in Gadau, with others in Misau and Bauchi city.

== History ==
After becoming independent in 1960, Nigeria had only one university at Ibadan, which was an affiliate of the University of London. The Ashby Commission, set up in 1959 to advise the Government on the need for tertiary education recommended the establishment of what is today referred to as "First Generation Universities": the University of Ibadan, University of Ife, University of Lagos, and Ahmadu Bello University, Zaria. By the 1970s, the projections of the Ashby Commission report were found to be unrealistic, particularly on student enrollment and course offerings, motivating the establishment of the so-called "Second Generation Universities". By the early 1980s, the Federal Government had attempted to establish a university in each of the then 19 States. The continued demand for tertiary education led to the liberalization of the federal monopoly on establishing universities, allowing the States to establish their universities.

In 2007, the former State Governor Ahmad Adamu Muazu created a Planning and Implementation Committee. In October 2008, Governor Isa Yuguda initiated another committee to resume the effort. In June 2009, an Implementation Committee proceeded, building on the previous committees' work. After the committee reviewed the acquisition and improvement of the campus sites at Gadau (Azare), Misau, and Bauchi, the Government awarded several contracts for the renovation of the campuses. The Government then engaged a Lagos-based firm to produce the Bauchi State University Academic Brief, a Master Plan, and a Strategic Plan to cover its 25-year development plan. The law establishing the university was passed by the Bauchi State House of Assembly and approved by Governor Isa Yuguda on 31 December 2010.

== Campuses and departments ==
The university has three campuses:

- Gadau (Azare), the main campus and location of the administration
- Misau Campus
- Bauchi Campus

Faculties

- Gadau Campus
  - School of Basic and Remedial Studies
  - Faculty of Art
  - Faculty of Education
  - Faculty of Agriculture
  - Faculty of Basic Medical Sciences
  - Faculty of Pharmaceutical Sciences
  - Faculty of Science
- Misau Campus
  - Faculty of Law
- Bauchi Campus
  - Faculty of Social Science
  - Faculty of Management Science

By the end of the fourth phase of development (2026/27 - 2030/31) the university is expected to have the following faculties:

- Gadau Campus
  - Faculty of Arts
  - Faculty of Education
  - Faculty of Science
  - School of Basic and Remedial Studies
  - Faculty of Pharmaceutical Sciences
- Misau Campus
  - Faculty of Law
- Bauchi Campus
  - Faculty of Management Sciences
  - Faculty of Social Sciences
  - Faculty of Environmental Sciences

== Notes ==
- Bauchi State University "Academic-Brief 2011/12-2020/21" Volume I, Feb. 2013
- Review of Basug, 3rd Meeting with TOROSA By Ibrahim Baba Ahmed(Marel), chairman of the committee,12/5/2015.
- Sa'adu Zungur University Bauchi State logo
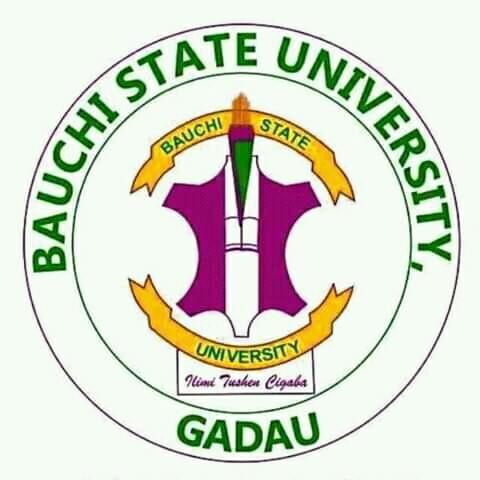

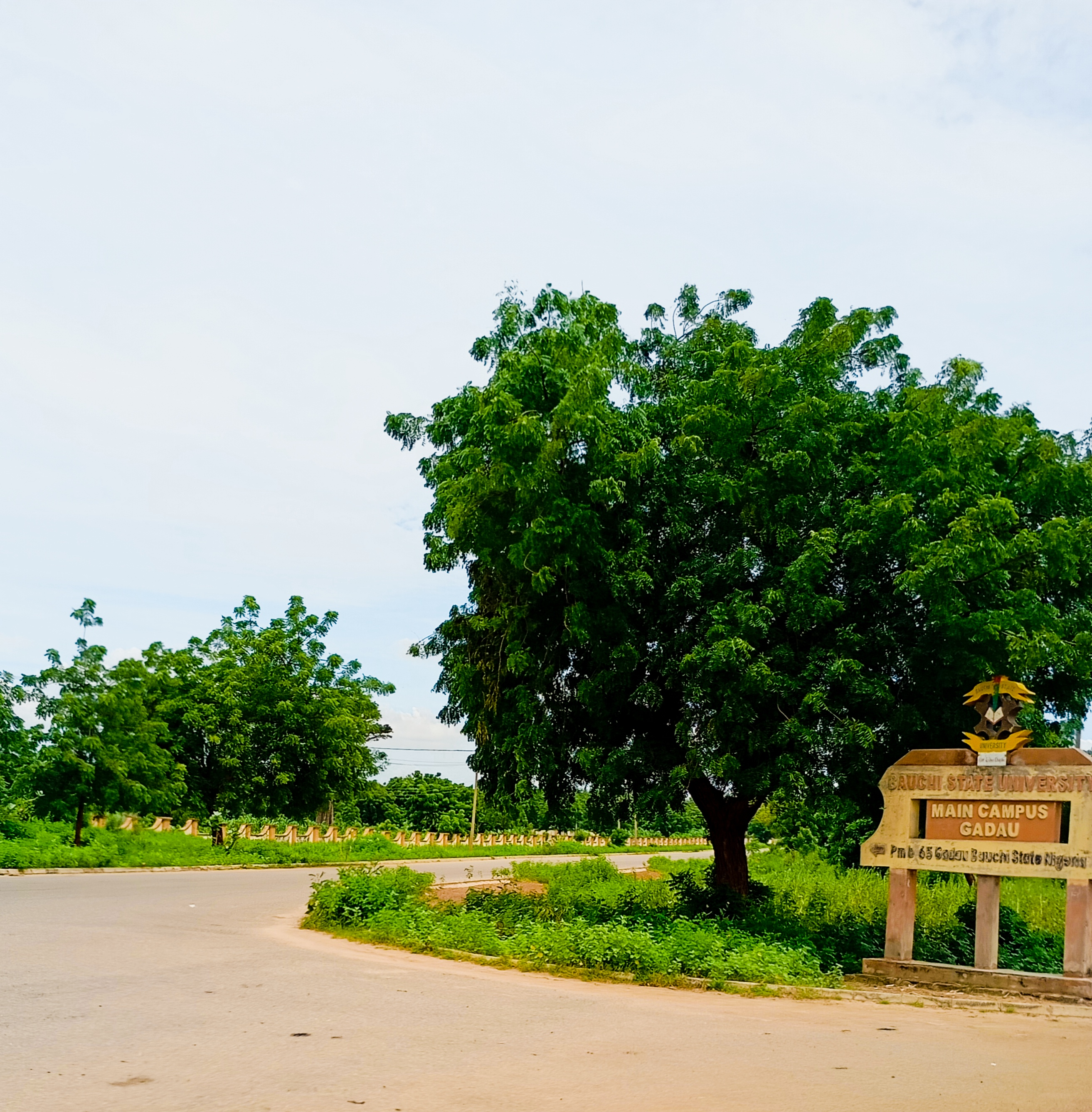

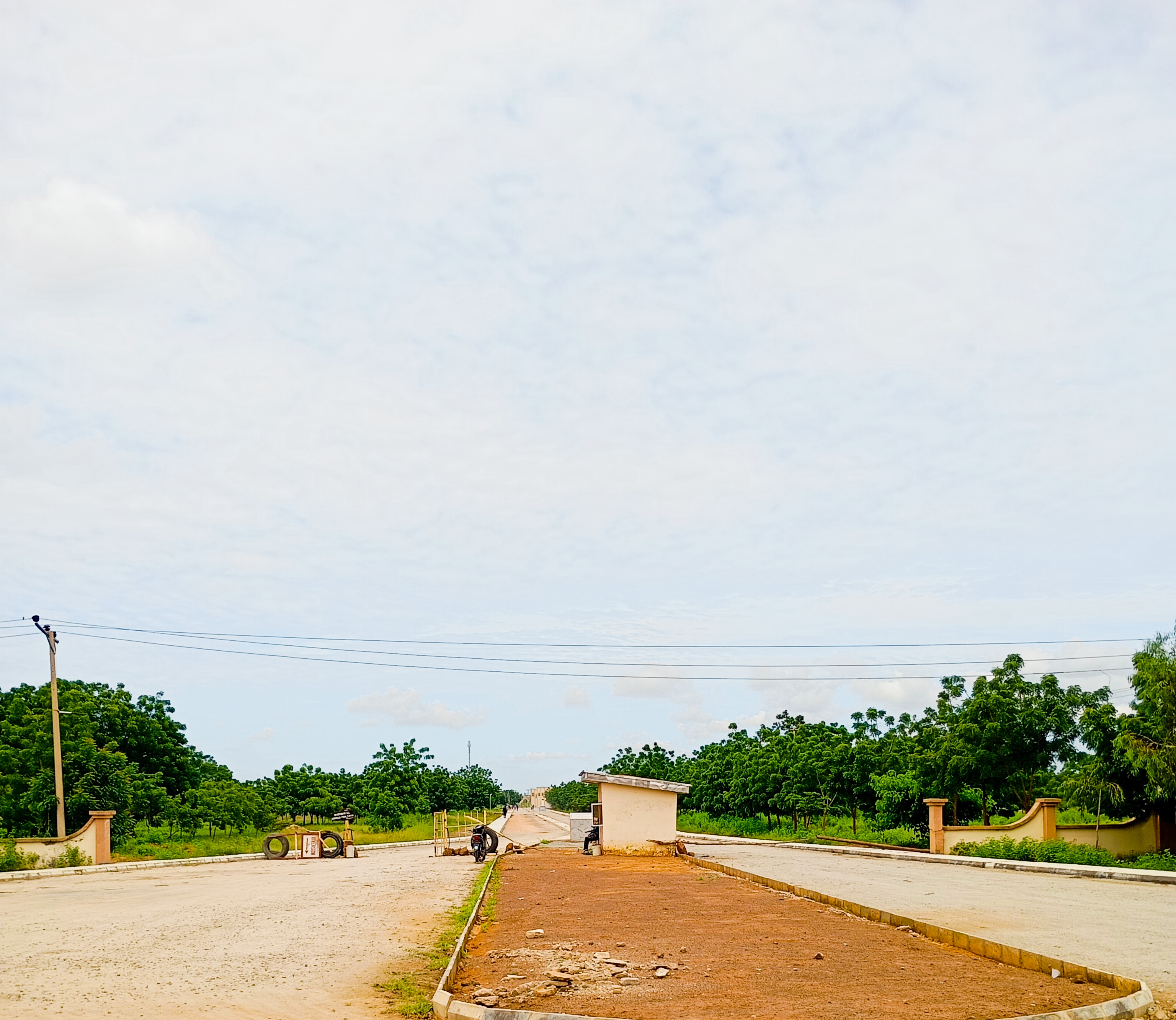

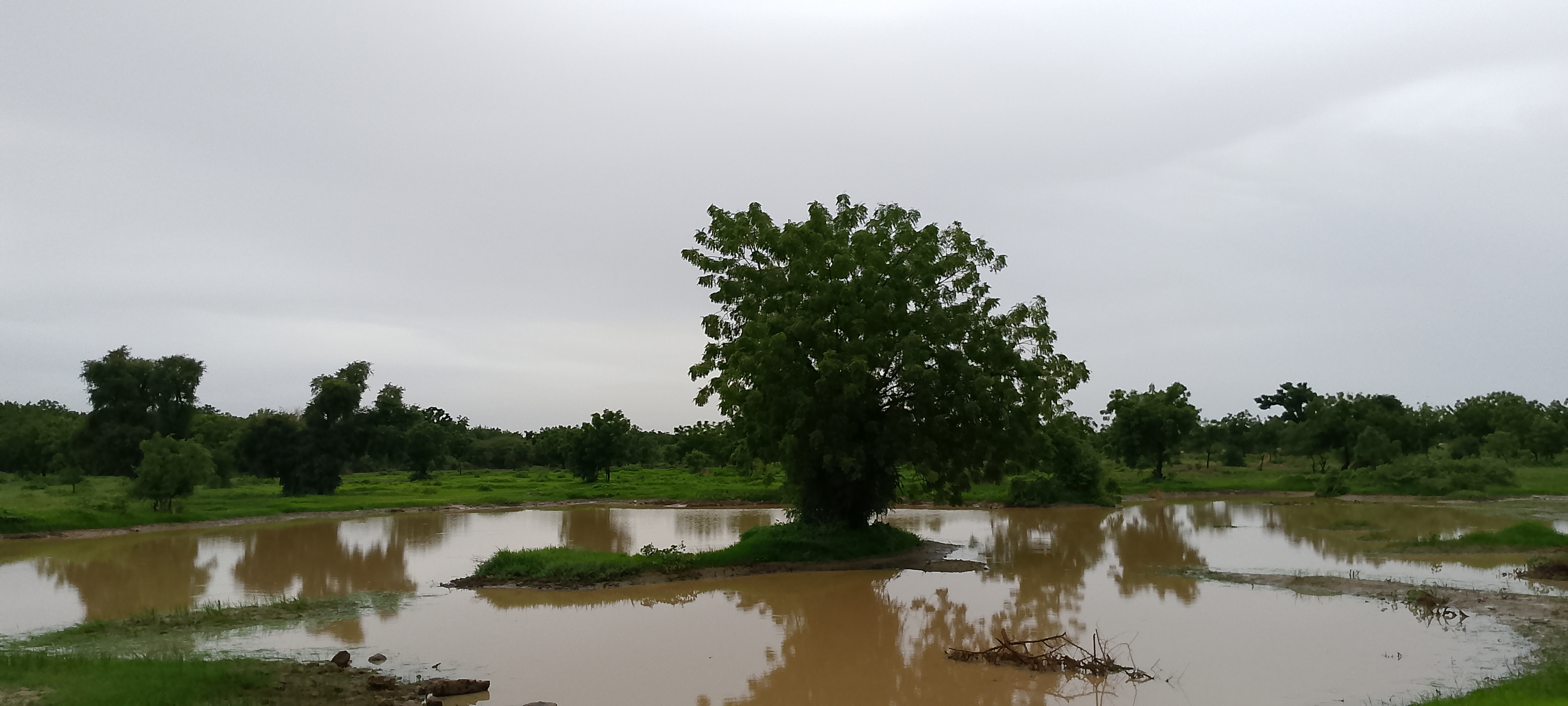

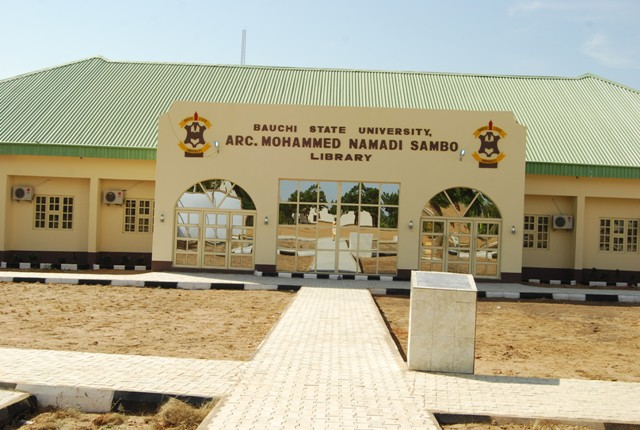

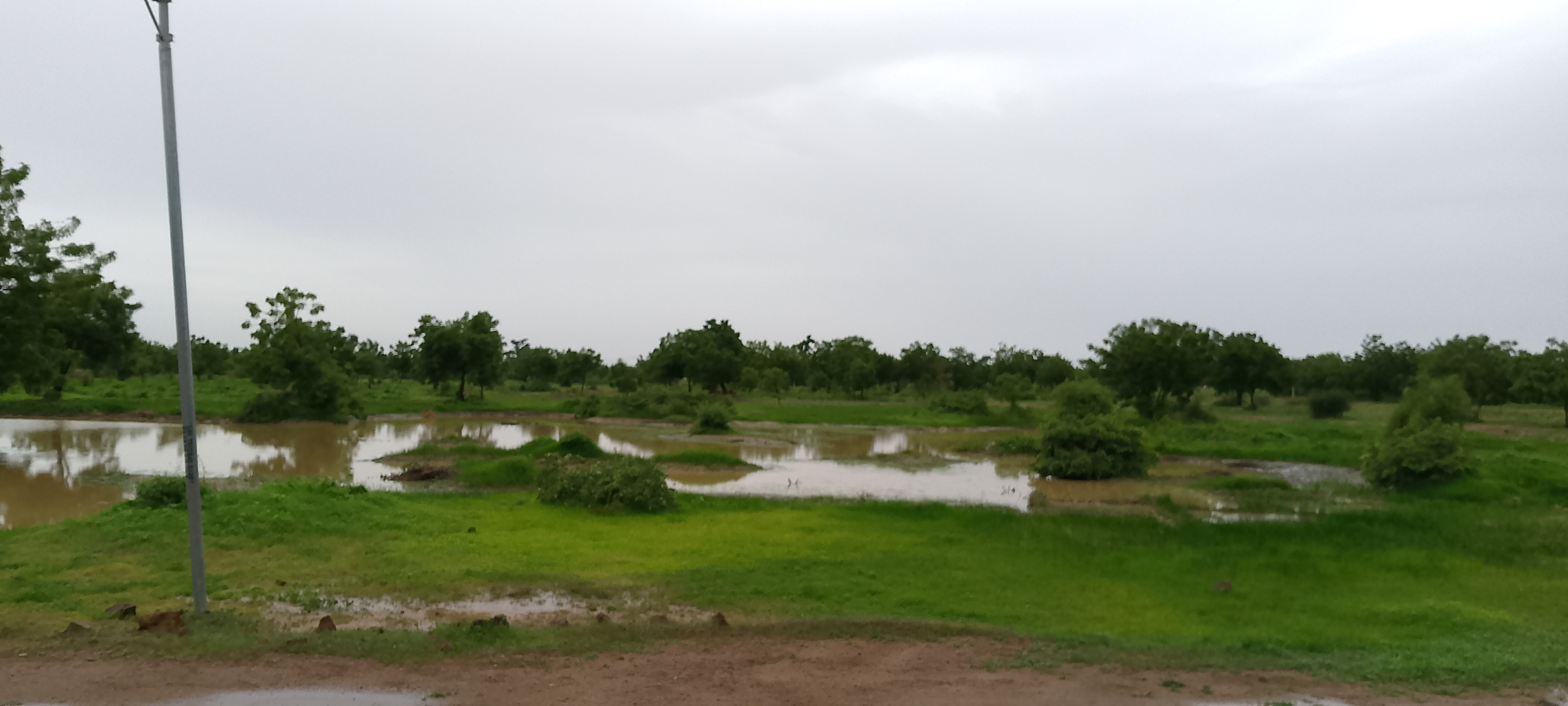
