= Lake Maladumba =

Lake in Bauchi State, Nigeria

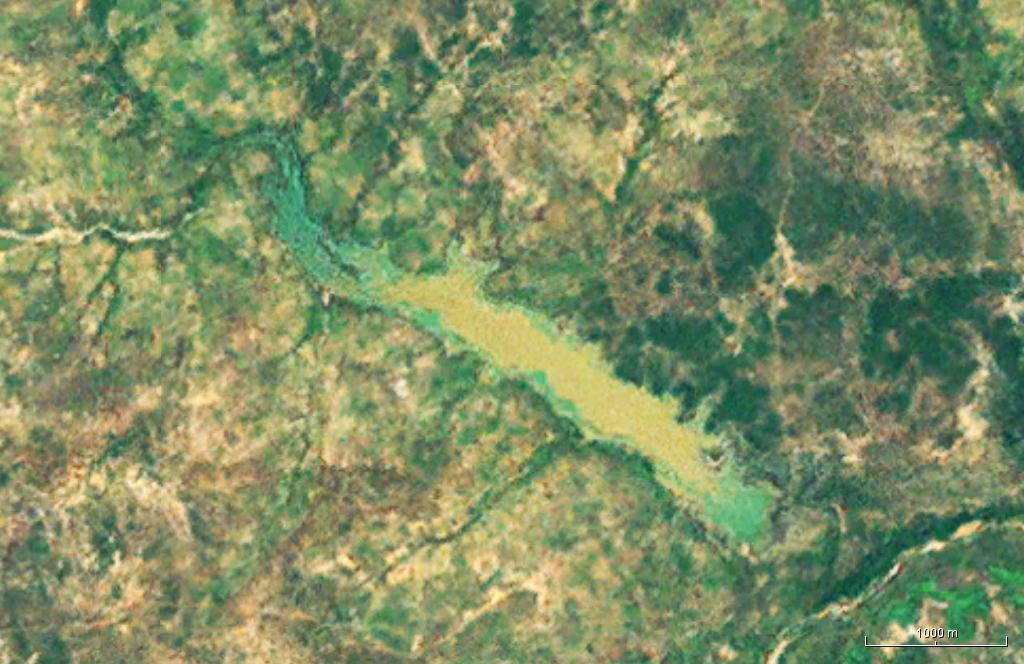
- Satellite image of the lake

- Location of Lake Maladumba Lake Maladumba (Africa)
- Location: Bauchi, Nigeria
- Coordinates: 11°13′48″N 10°21′54″E
- Primary inflows: Kuka
- Primary outflows: Kari
- Basin countries: Nigeria
- Max. length: 5 km (3.1 mi)
- Max. width: 0.4 km (0.25 mi)
- Surface area: 18.6 km^{2} (7.2 sq mi)
- Max. depth: 2 m (7 ft)

The Lake Maladumba is a lake located in the Nigerian state of Bauchi.

== Location ==
It is situated in the northern part of the Jos Plateau, approximately 120 km northeast of the city of Bauchi, 18 km southwest of Misau, and 2 km west of Shelon, a small fishing village. It is a shallow lake, with an average depth of about two meters, and lies along the bed of the Kuka River, which exits the lake as the Kari River. This is a tributary of the Komadugu Gana, and thus the lake belongs to the river system of the Komadugu Yobe, a river in the Lake Chad basin that until the 1980s flowed into Lake Chad.

== Climate ==
The climate in the lake’s region is characterized by a clear distinction between dry and wet seasons. The rainy season lasts from May to October, with precipitation peaking with the arrival of the West African monsoon, starting in June. During this period, an average of 800 mm of rain falls. The dry season lasts from November to April and is meteorologically determined by the northeast trade wind, the harmattan. Average temperatures range from 26 °C when the harmattan blows to 34 °C in April and May, the hottest period of the year.

== The Nature Sanctuary ==
Lake Maladumba covers an average area of 18.6 km² and is located within a protected area, the Maladumba Lake Forest Reserve (51.8 km²), which on 30 April 2008 was included in the list of wetlands of international importance under the Ramsar Convention. The lake is about 5 km long, with an average width of 300–400 meters, and hosts a wide variety of flora and fauna typical of the Sudan region.

== Flora and fauna ==
The lake contains 29 fish species, including the Nile gymnorchus (Gymnarchus niloticus), various species of the families Latidae and Bagridae, and the tiger fish (Hydrocynus spp.). In the surrounding Forest Reserve, 175 plant species grow, including 26 species of trees and shrubs. These include Acacia kamerunensis, Acacia nilotica, Combretum nigricans, Combretum molle, Tamarindus indica, Holarrhena floribunda, Burkea africana, Anogeissus leiocarpa, and Adansonia digitata. This area is home to the African buffalo (Syncerus caffer), the bushbuck (Tragelaphus scriptus), the aardvark (Orycteropus afer), the African civet (Civettictis civetta), genets (Genetta spp.), the African brush-tailed porcupine (Atherurus africanus), the patas monkey (Erythrocebus patas), and monitor lizards (Varanus spp.).
