= Yana, Nigeria =

Yana
- City
- Location within Nigeria
- Country: Nigeria

Yana is a town and the headquarters of Shira Local Government Area in Bauchi State, Nigeria. Jaka, Bela, Jalingo, and Gabali are among the towns, cities, and locations close to Yana.

== Geography ==
=== Climate ===
In Yana, the dry season is oppressively hot and partially cloudy, while the wet season is oppressively hot and largely cloudy. The average annual temperature ranges from 56 to 103 degrees Fahrenheit, rarely falling below 50 or rising over 107.

Between March 15 and May 21, which is the length of the hot season, the average daily high temperature is above 100°F. In Yana, April is the hottest month of the year, with an average high of 103°F and low of 75°F.

From July 17 to September 26, the cool season, which has an average daily high temperature below 90°F, lasts for 2.3 months. With an average low of 57°F and high of 90°F, January is the coldest month of the year in Yana.
