= Ahmed Aliyu Jalam =

Nigerian politician

- Born: c. 1964; Jalam, Bauchi, Nigeria
- Died: June 1, 2024
- Other name: Mai Kankana
- Occupation: Politician
- Spouse: 4 wives

Ahmed Aliyu Jalam (1964 – 1 June 2024) was a Nigerian politician from Jalam, Dambam local government area of Bauchi State, Nigeria. He was commissioner of Religious Affairs in Bauchi State from 2019 - 2021. He later became Commissioner for Local Government and Chieftaincy Affairs Bauchi State from 2021 to 2023.

== Personal life ==
Ahmed had four wives and many children. He died in a road accident on Saturday 1 June 2024.
