= Ajawa language =

Afro-Asiatic language

Ajawa
- Native to: Nigeria
- Region: Bauchi State
- Extinct: ca. 1930
- Language family: Afro-Asiatic: Chadic; West Chadic; Bade–Warji; Warji (B.2); Ajawa

Language codes
- ISO 639-3: ajw
- Glottolog: ajaw1236

Ajawa is an extinct Afro-Asiatic language formerly spoken in Bauchi State, Nigeria. Ajawa became extinct between 1920 and 1940 as speakers switched to Hausa.
