= Paʼa language =

Chadic language spoken in Nigeria

Paʼa
- Afa
- Fucaka
- Native to: Nigeria
- Region: Bauchi State
- Native speakers: (8,000 cited 1995)
- Language family: Afro-Asiatic: Chadic; West Chadic; Bade–Warji; Warji (B.2); Paʼa

Language codes
- ISO 639-3: pqa
- Glottolog: paaa1242
- ELP: Pa'a

- Person: FuCiki
- People: Foni
- Language: FuCaka

Paʼa, also known as Afa (Afawa) or Fucaka (autonym), is an Afro-Asiatic language spoken in Bauchi State, Nigeria.

== Phonology ==
Consonants
	Labial	Alveolar		Palatal	Velar		Glottal		
	Labial	plain	lateral	Palatal	plain	labialized	plain	labialized	palatalized
Plosive	p b	t d		c ɟ	k ɡ	kʷ ɡʷ	ʔ		
Prenasalized	ᵐb	ⁿd		ⁿɟ	ᵑɡ	ᵑɡʷ			
Implosive	ɓ	ɗ							
Ejective		s’	ɬ’		k’	kʷ’			
Fricative	f v	s z	ɬ ɮ	ʃ ʒ			h ɦ	hʷ ɦʷ	hʲ ɦʲ
Nasal	m	n							
Approximant		r	l	j, ˀj		w			

Vowels
	Front	Central	Back
High	i iː		u uː
Mid	e eː		o oː
Low		a aː	

Additionally, the following diphthongs are recorded: /ei/, /au/.

Pa'a also has four tones; high, mid, low, and falling.
