= Ciwogai language =

Afro-Asiatic language spoken in Nigeria

Ciwogai
- Tsagu
- Native to: Nigeria
- Region: Bauchi State
- Native speakers: (2,000 cited 1995)
- Language family: Afro-Asiatic: Chadic; West Chadic; Bade–Warji; Warji (B.2); Ciwogai

Language codes
- ISO 639-3: tgd
- Glottolog: ciwo1236

Ciwogai (Tsagu) is an Afro-Asiatic language spoken in Bauchi State, Nigeria.
