= Fatima Tahir =

Nigerian academic

Fatima Ja'afar Tahir
- Occupations: Vice-Chancellor, Bauchi State University, Gadau

Academic background
- Education: Abubakar Tafawa Balewa University, Bauchi State

Academic work
- Discipline: Microbiology

Fatima Ja’afar Tahir (born 8 February 1966) is a Nigerian Professor of Microbiology and the Vice-Chancellor of Bauchi State University since 2022. She was Acting Vice-Chancellor at the Nigerian Army University Biu, Borno State and widely recognized as the first female Professor of Microbiology to be produced by Abubakar Tafawa Balewa University, Bauchi State.

== Early life ==
Fatima Tahir was born on 8 February 1966, into the family of Alhaji Ja’afar Tahir. She is the younger sister of late Dr. Ibrahim Tahir.

== Education ==
Tahir obtained her first degree in microbiology from Abubakar Tafawa Balewa University. Her masters and doctoral degrees were also obtained from the same institution in the same field of study.

== Career ==
She began her academic journey as a Graduate Assistant at Abubakar Tafawa Balewa University in 1991 and in 2009, She rose to the rank of Professor of Microbiology.

Tahir is a member of a number of professional bodies, including the Nigerian Society for Microbiology (NSM), Nigerian Institute of Food Science and Technology (NIFST), American Society for Microbiology (ASM), Society for Applied Microbiology (SFAM), amongst others.

Tahir became the Vice Chancellor of Bauchi State University in 2022.
