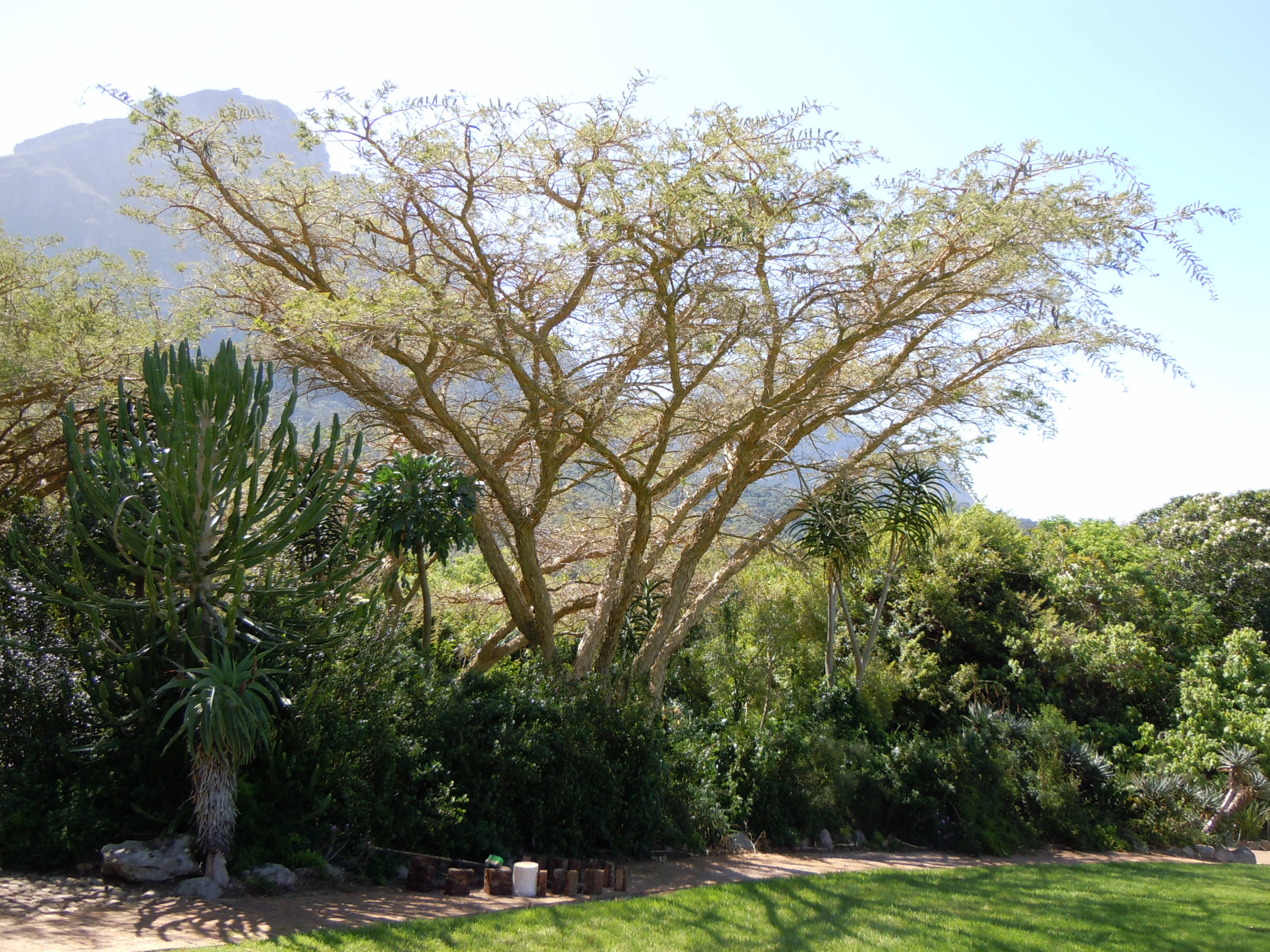
- In Kirstenbosch, Cape Town

Scientific classification
- Kingdom: Plantae
- Clade: Embryophytes
- Clade: Tracheophytes
- Clade: Spermatophytes
- Clade: Angiosperms
- Clade: Eudicots
- Clade: Rosids
- Order: Fabales
- Family: Fabaceae
- Subfamily: Caesalpinioideae
- Clade: Mimosoid clade
- Genus: Vachellia
- Species: V. sieberiana

Binomial name
- Vachellia sieberiana (DC.) Kyal. & Boatwr. 2013

Varieties
- See text.

Synonyms
- Acacia abyssinica sensu auct.; Acacia amboensis Schinz; Acacia davyi sensu auct.; Acacia purpurascens Vatke; Acacia sieberiana DC.; Acacia sieberiana subsp. vermoesenii (De Wild.)Troupin; Acacia vermoesenii De Wild.; Vachellia sieberiana (DC.) Ali 2014

= Vachellia sieberiana =

Paperbark acacia

Species of legume

Vachellia sieberiana, until recently known as Acacia sieberiana, is a tree native to southern Africa and introduced into Pakistan. It is used in many areas for various purposes. The tree varies from 3 to 25 m in height, with a trunk diameter of 0.6 to 1.8 m. It is not listed as being a threatened species.

== Varieties ==
- Vachellia sieberiana var. sieberiana – longpod thorn, false paperbark thorn
- Vachellia sieberiana var. villosa (A.Chev.) Kyal. & Boatwr.
- Vachellia sieberiana var. woodii (Burtt Davy) Kyal. & Boatwr. – paperbark thorn

== Uses ==
Vachellia sieberiana is valued largely as a source of forage, medicine and wood. The inner bark is a source of fibre purposes such as stringing beads. The gum is edible and both livestock and game animals browse the tree and feed on the dropped pods, spreading viable seeds in their dung. The flowers of the tree make good forage for bees and bee hives are put directly in the trees to exploit the resource. The leaves of the tree commonly release toxic chemical compounds when the tree has been heavily browsed, some of the compounds may release hydrogen cyanide when ingested, which may be lethal to cattle. The fallen pods and foliage can provide lifesaving forage during dry times of the year.

The gum of the tree is used as food, as an adhesive, and as an ingredient in making ink.

=== Traditional medicinal uses ===
In Africa, the bark or root is used to treat urinary tract inflammation. The bark has astringent properties and it is used to treat colds, cough, and childhood fever. According to the World AgroForestry Centre,

"A decoction of the root is taken as remedy for stomach-ache. The bark, leaves and gums are used to treat tapeworm, bilharzia, haemorrhage, orchitis, colds, diarrhoea, gonorrhoea, kidney problems, syphilis, ophthalmia, rheumatism and disorders of the circulatory system. It is also used as an astringent. The pods serve as an emollient, and the roots for stomach-ache, acne, tapeworms, urethral problems, oedema and dropsy."

=== Nitrogen fixation ===
Vachellia sieberiana is a legume and like many legumes it hosts Rhizobium bacteria in its roots. The bacteria fix nitrogen gas from the air and, without requiring nitrogen fertilizer or soil nitrates, they convert it into nitrogen compounds necessary for plant nutrition. Ultimately, surrounding plants also benefit from the increase in available nitrogen, which means that plants such as Vachellia species are of particular ecological importance.

=== Tannin ===
Tannin is found in the bark and seed pods.

=== Wood ===
The wood is fairly hard and it is used for furniture, handles for implements and tools for grinding grain manually. The wood of V. sieberiana has a density of about 655 kg/m³.

== Ecology and conservation ==
This tree is widespread in its natural habitat and is not threatened. It is browsed upon by livestock and game such as elephant and giraffe.

== Gallery ==
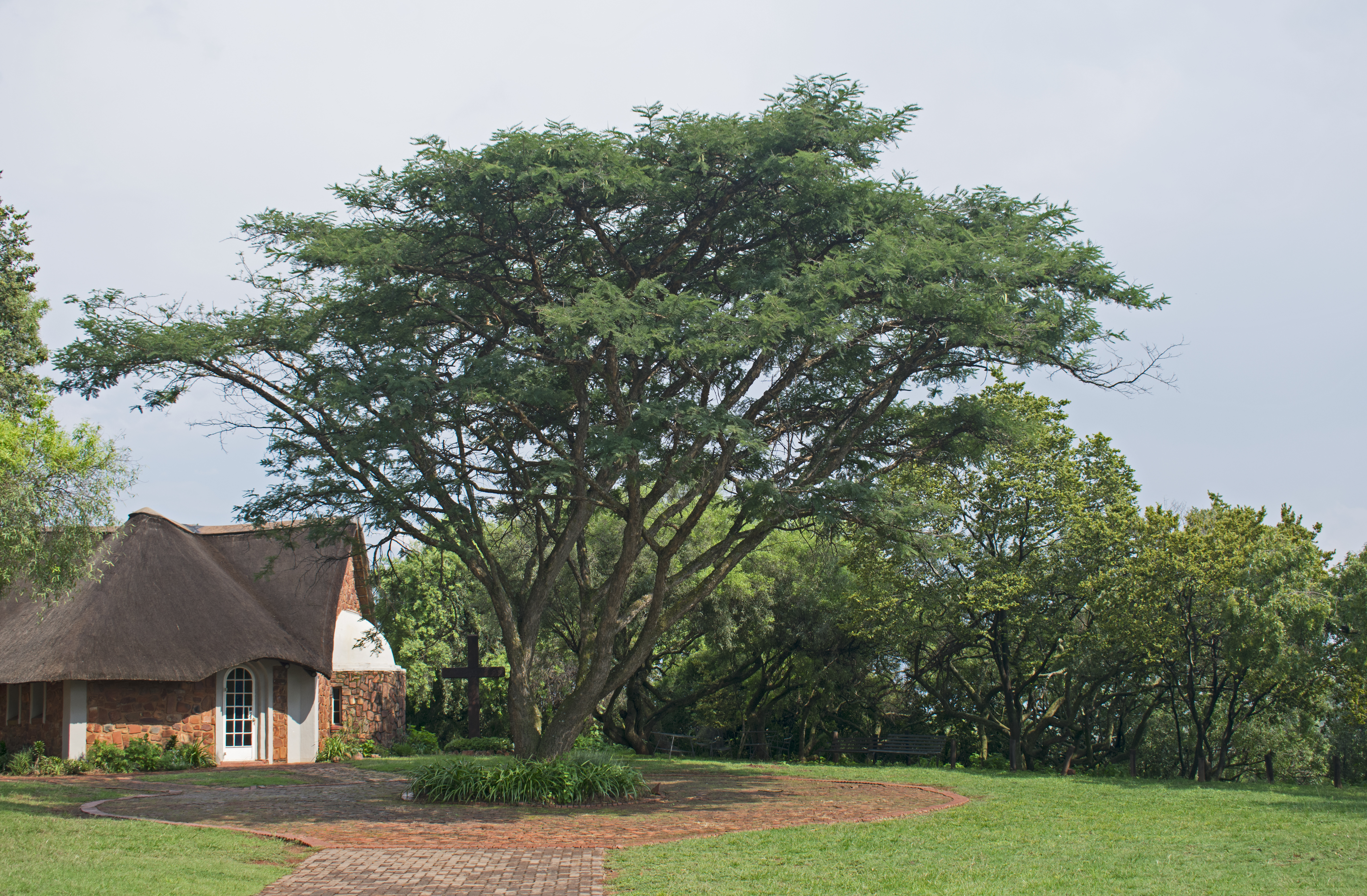
A tree on the grounds of Voortrekker Monument, Pretoria, South Africa

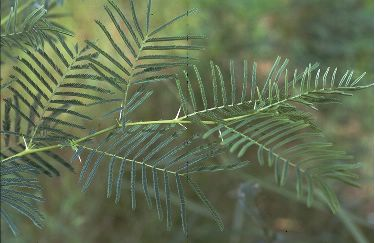
Close-up of the leaves

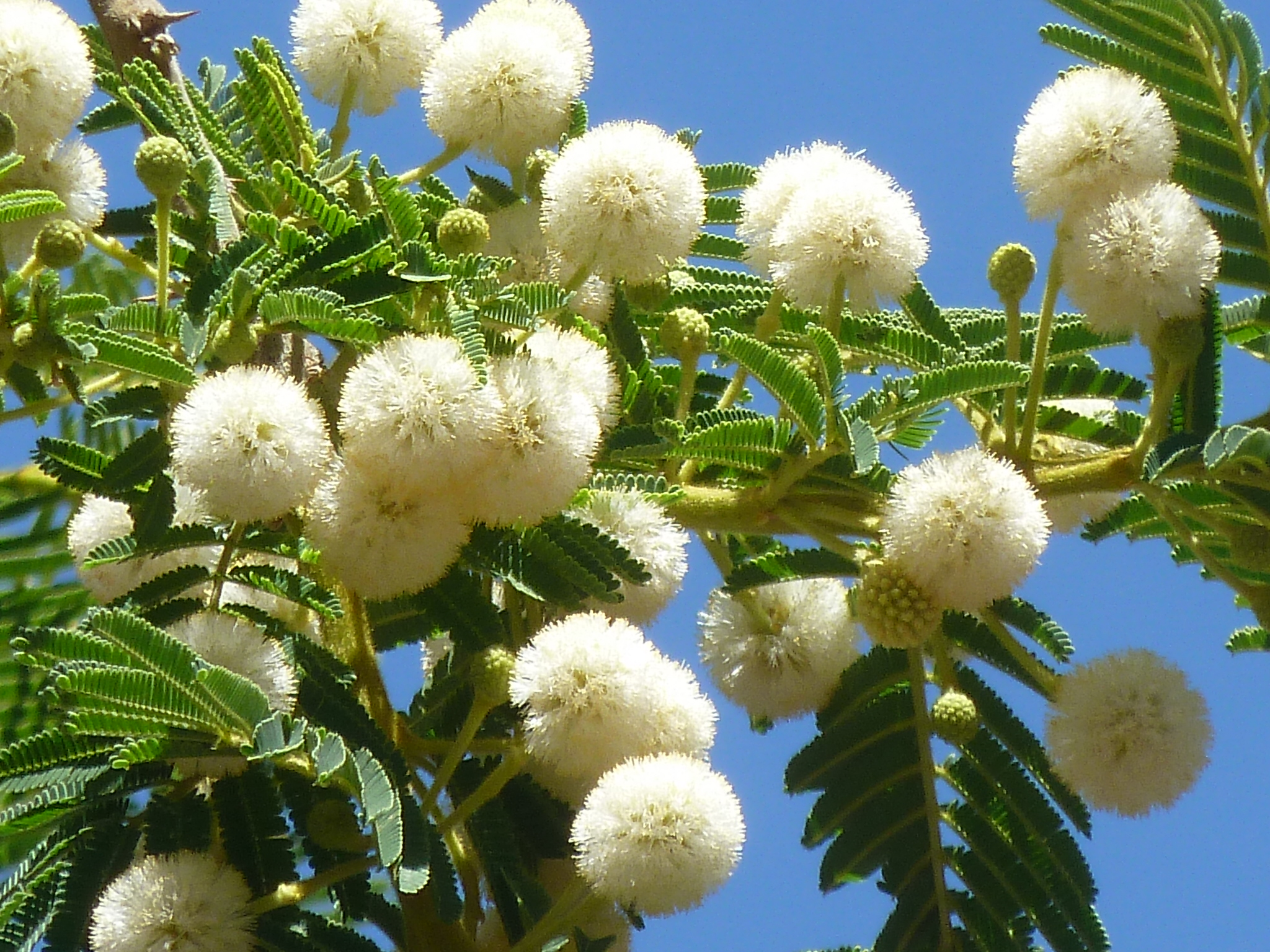
The creamy-white, spherical flower heads

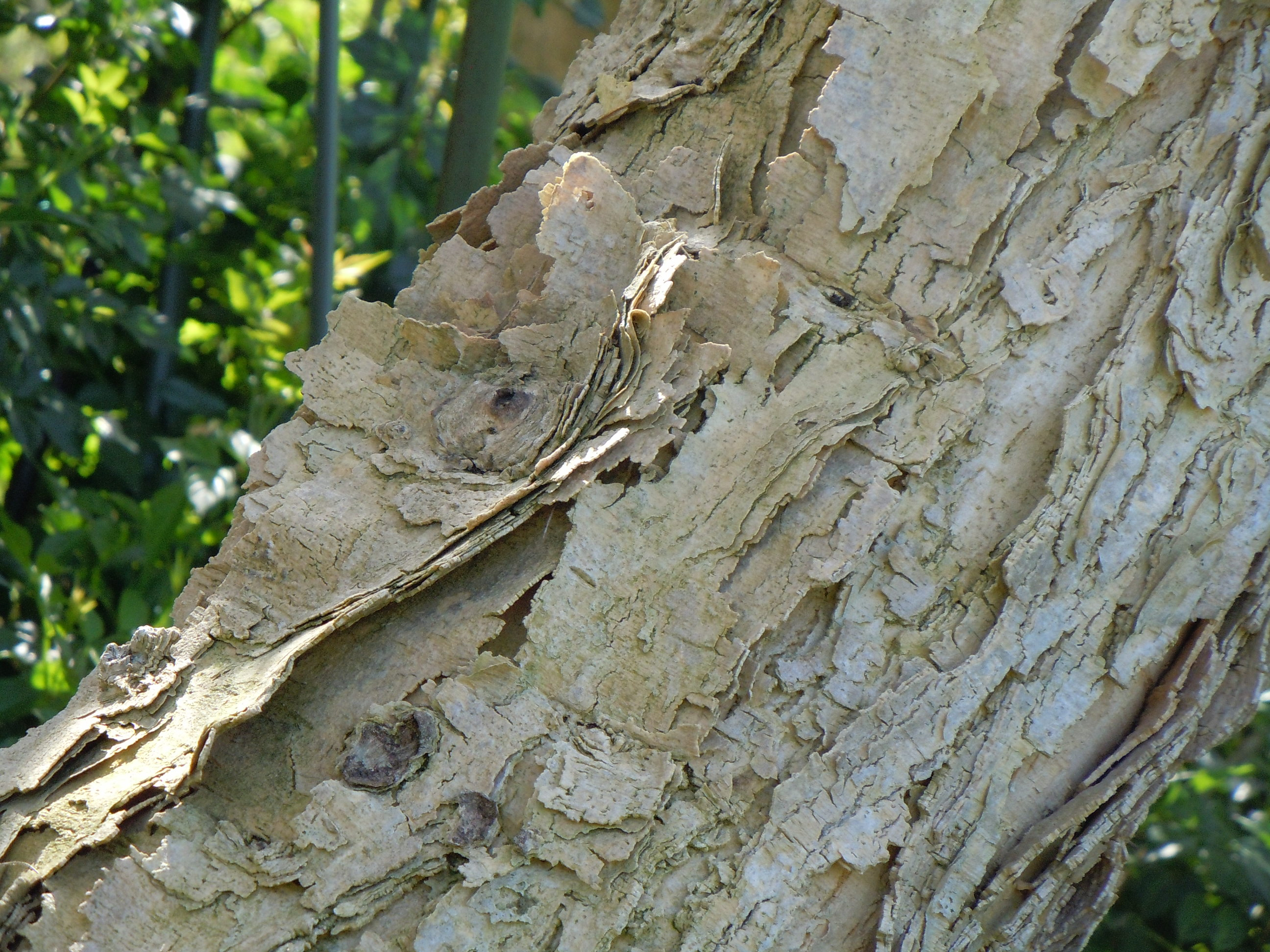
A close-up of the papery bark that gives the tree its vernacular name

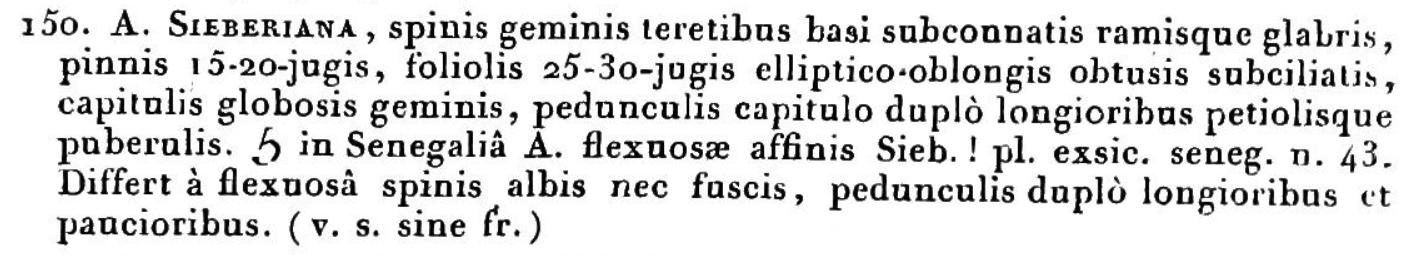
Original description by de Candolle (1825)
