= Warji language =

Chadic language spoken in Nigeria

Warji
- Sirzakwai
- Native to: Nigeria
- Region: Bauchi State
- Native speakers: 75,000 (2022)
- Language family: Afro-Asiatic: Chadic; West Chadic; Bade–Warji; Warji languages (B.2); Warji
- Writing system: Latin

Language codes
- ISO 639-3: wji
- Glottolog: warj1253
- ELP: Warji

Warji (Warjawa) or Sirzakwai is an Afro-Asiatic language spoken in Bauchi State, Nigeria. Speakers are shifting to Hausa.

== Distribution ==
Warji is spoken in:

- Ganjuwa district, Darazo LGA, Bauchi State
- Warji district, Ningi LGA, Bauchi State
- Birnin Kudu LGA, Jigawa State

== Morphology ==
Within the Bade–Warji languages, Warji has the most complex nominal plural marking system. Plurals are marked by the following suffixes.

- -tsǝ
- -sA (-sǝ, -sa)
- -Aŋsǝ (-ǝŋsǝ, -aŋsǝ)
- -(aŋ)ʃi (-shi, -aŋshi; stem-final -i is assimilated)

These may be all allomorphs of a single suffix, with optional inserted nasals.

Suppletive nominal plurals are:

English	singular	plural
child	ŋaa	mǝru
girl	ŋaagǝɗ	mǝrǝgudi
woman	gǝɗ	guɗi
man	mumwan	mumwanci
human being	warji	zarsǝ
