= A345 highway (Nigeria) =

Road in Nigeria

Coordinates: 9.631359°N 11.846464°E

Trunk Road A345

Location
- Country: Nigeria

Highway system
- Transport in Nigeria

The A345 highway is a highway in Nigeria. It is one of the east-west roads linking the main south-north roads. (It is named from the two highways it links).

It runs from the A3 highway at Bauchi to the A4 highway at Biu, Borno State. The city of Gombe the capital of Gombe State is on the road. The city of Kumo, headquarters of Akko LGA, is also on the road.
