= Misau =

- LGA and town
- Interactive map of Misau
- Country: Nigeria
- State: Bauchi State

Government
  - Local Government Chairman: Salisu Hussaini

Area
  - Total: 1,226 km^{2} (473 sq mi)

Population (2006)
  - Total: 263,487
  - Density: 214.9/km^{2} (556.6/sq mi)
- Time zone: UTC+1 (WAT)
- Postal code: 750

Misau is a Local Government Area of Bauchi State, Nigeria. Its headquarters are in the town of Misau. The people of Misau are mostly Fulani and Kanuri.

It has an area of 1,226 km^{2} and a population of 263,487 at the 2006 census.

The postal code of the area is 750.

== Climate ==
Averaging 115.77 wet days (31.72% of the time), Misau typically has a yearly temperature of 28.98 °C (84.16 °F), which is 0.48% cooler than Nigeria's average.

== Air pollution ==
Due to the airborne particles that can cause asthma attacks, bronchitis, and other lung conditions by inhaling into the deepest parts of the lung, Misau is at serious risk for serious health problems.

== Education ==
The A.D. Rufa'i College of Education, Legal and General Studies is located in Misau.
