= Bauchi State =

State of Nigeria

Bauchi
- State
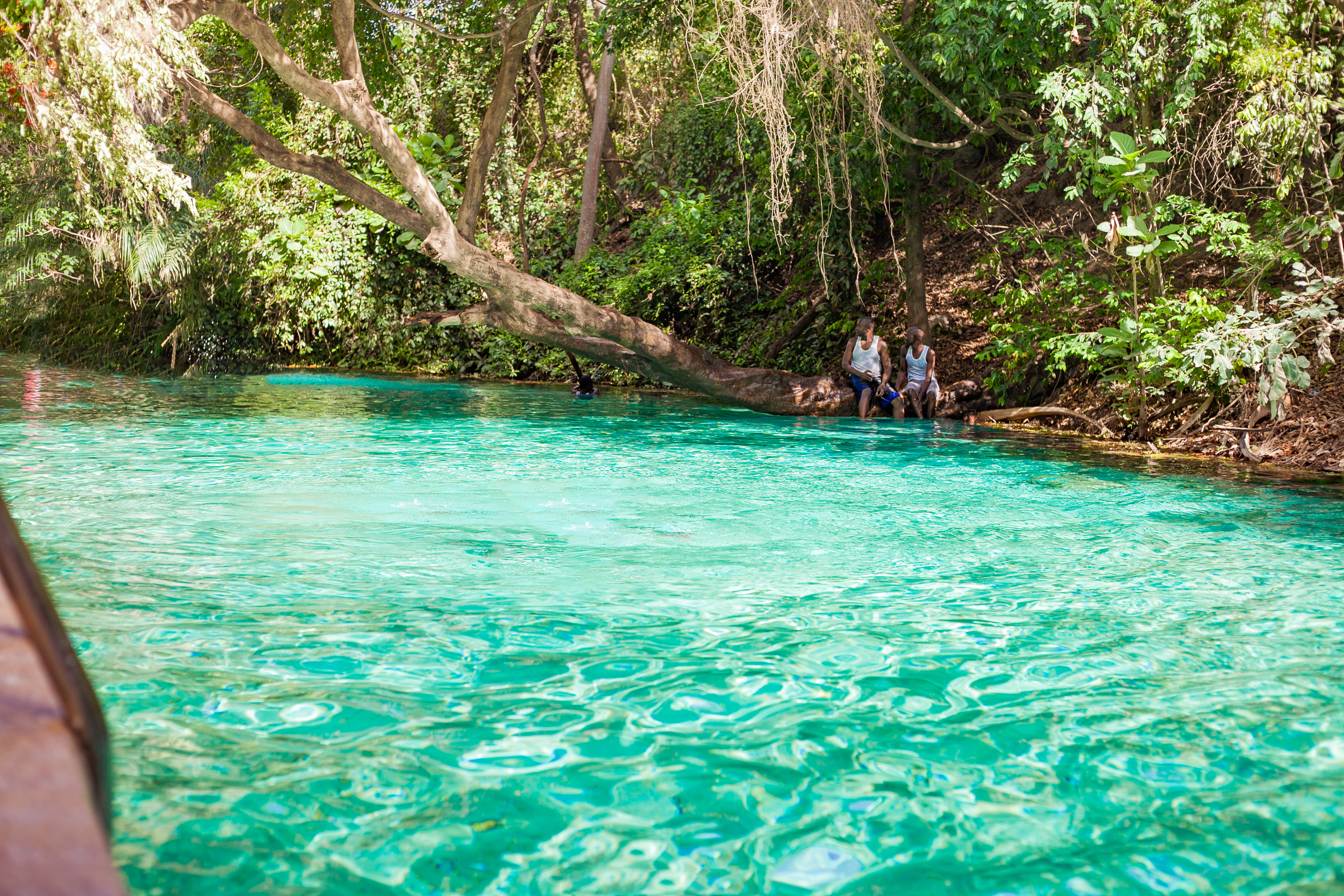
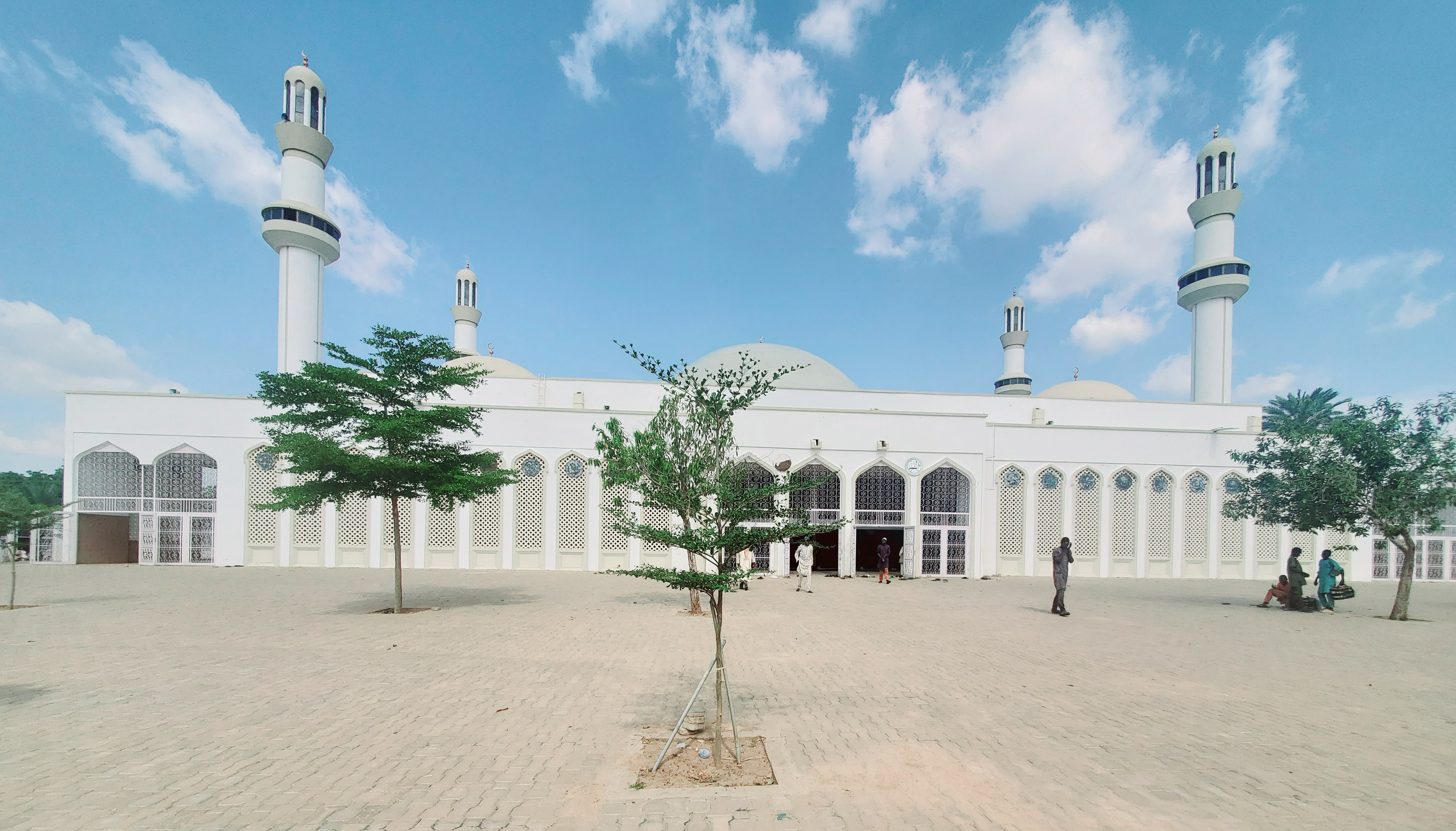
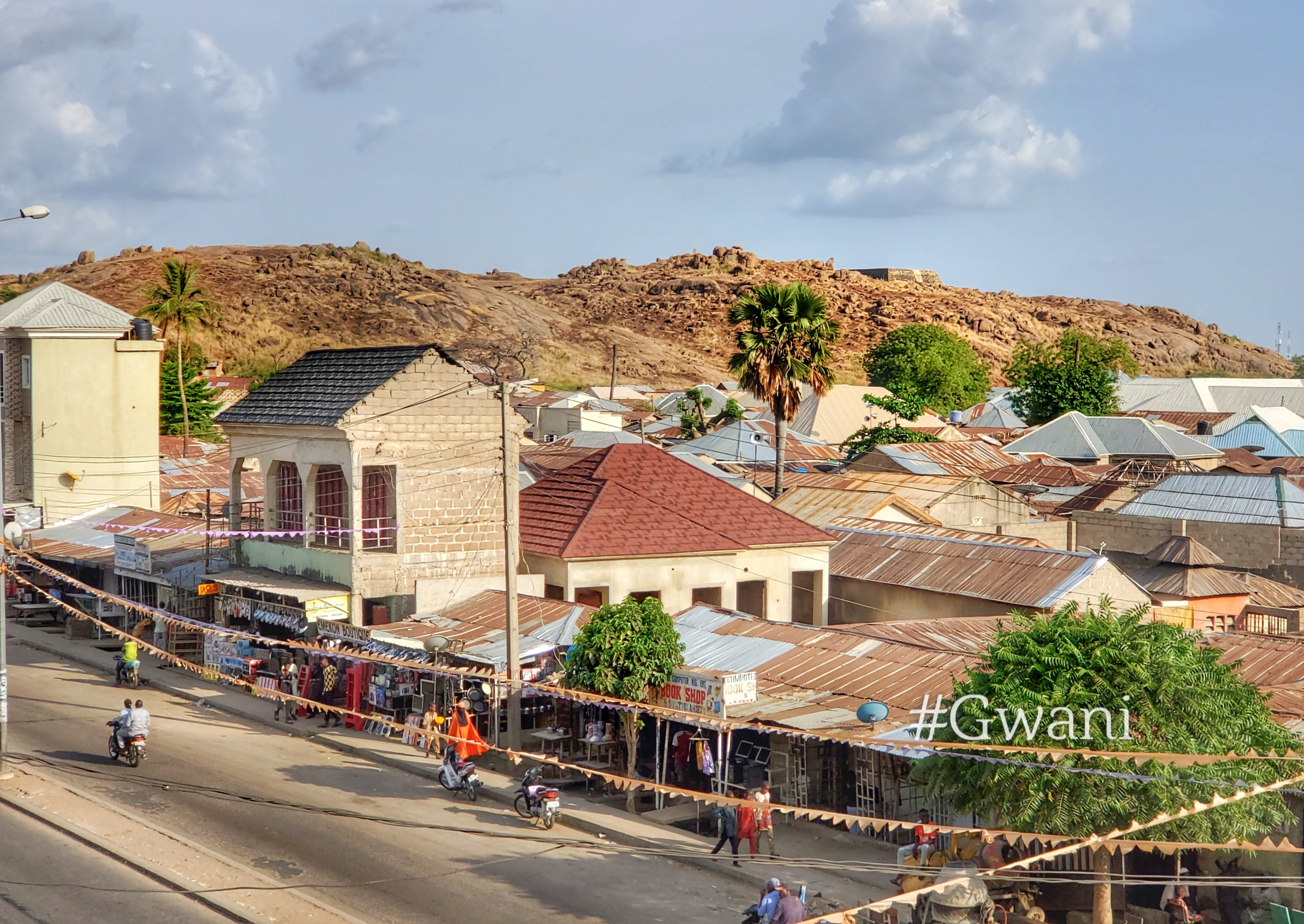
- Yankari Game Reserve Azare Central Mosque Kobi Hill Bauchi State University

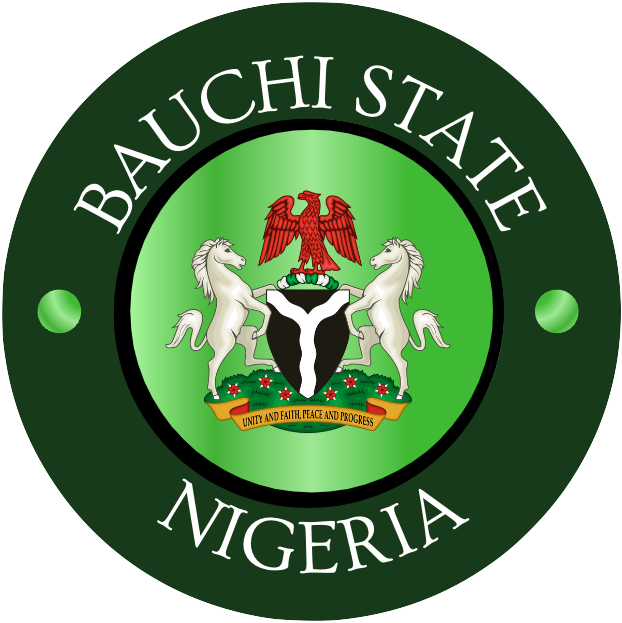
- Flag Seal
- Nicknames: Pearl of Tourism
- Location of Bauchi State in Nigeria
- Coordinates: 10°18′24″N 9°48′45″E
- Country: Nigeria
- LGAs: 20
- Date created: 3 February 1976
- Capital: Bauchi

Government
  - Body: Government of Bauchi State
  - Governor: Bala Mohammed (PDP)
  - Deputy Governor: Auwal Jatau (PDP)
  - Legislature: Bauchi State House of Assembly
  - Senators: C: Abdul Ahmed Ningi (PDP); N: Adamu Bulkachuwa (APC); S: Lawal Yahaya Gumau (NNPP)
  - Representatives: List

Area
  - Total: 45,893 km^{2} (17,719 sq mi)
  - Rank: 5th of 36

Population (2006 census)
  - Total: 4,676,465
  - Estimate (2022): 8,308,800
  - Rank: 7th of 36
  - Density: 101.90/km^{2} (263.92/sq mi)

GDP (PPP)
  - Year: 2021
  - Total: $17.01 billion 22nd of 36
  - Per capita: $2,194; 29th of 36
- Time zone: UTC+01 (WAT)
- Postal code: 740001
- ISO 3166 code: NG-BA
- HDI (2022): 0.372 low · 35th of 37
- Website: www.bauchistate.gov.ng

Bauchi (Hausa: Jihar Bauchi / Fula: Leydi Bauchi 𞤤𞤫𞤴𞤣𞤭 𞤦𞤢𞤵𞤷𞥅𞤭) is a state located in northeastern Nigeria. It is bordered by Jigawa to the north, Yobe to the north-east, Gombe to the east, Taraba and Plateau to the south, Kaduna to the west and Kano to the northwest respectfully. It takes its name from the historic city of Bauchi, which also serves as its capital. The state was formed in the year 1976, when the former North-Eastern State was broken up. It originally included the area that is now Gombe State, which became a distinct state in 1996.

Of the 36 states, Bauchi is the fifth largest in area and also the fifth most populous, with an estimated population of over 8,308,800 as of 2022. Geographically, the state is divided between the West Sudanian savanna in the south and the drier, semi-desert Sahelian savanna in the north with a small part of the montane Bauchi Plateau in the southwest. A key defining characteristic of the state’s landscape is Yankari National Park, a large wildlife park in southern Bauchi State that contains large populations of waterbuck, African buffalo, patas monkey, hippopotamus, roan antelope, and western hartebeest along with some of Nigeria's last remaining West African lion, African leopard and African bush elephant populations.

What is now Bauchi State has been inhabited for ages by various ethnic groups, including the Bolewa, Butawa, and Warji in the central region; the Fulani, Kanuri, and Karai-Karai in the north; the Bankal, Jaku and Gerawa in and around the city of Bauchi; the Zaar and the Gwak in the south; the Dugurawa in the southeast; and the Jarawa in the southwest. Religiously, the vast majority of the state's population (~80%) are Muslim with Christian and traditionalist minorities at about 15% and 5%, respectively. Evangelicals are the dominant Christian denomination but there are also adherents of Catholicism. The Anglican Diocese of Bauchi is part of the Province of Jos, within the Church of Nigeria.

As a major agriculture-based state, the Bauchi State economy partially relies on livestock and crops, such as cotton, groundnuts, millet, tomatoes, and yams with advanced irrigation schemes increasing agricultural production since statehood. Other industries include food processing and canning facilities, tin and columbite mining, and tourism in Yankari National Park and its Wikki Warm Springs.

== Etymology ==
According to tradition, it was named after a hunter known as Baushe, who settled in the region before the arrival of Yakubu, the first traditional ruler of the Bauchi emirate (founded 1800–10). Bauchi and Adamawa were the two main sources of freedom and tourism for the Fulani empire of Sokoto.

== History ==
What is now known as Bauchi was until 1976 a province in the then North-Eastern State of Nigeria. According to the 2006 census, the state has a population of 4,653,066.

In the early 1800s, the Fulani jihad seized much of modern-day Bauchi State and formed the Bauchi Emirate under the Sokoto Caliphate. About 90 years later, a British expedition occupied the Emirate and incorporated it as Bauchi Province into the Northern Nigeria Protectorate which later merged into British Nigeria before becoming independent as Nigeria in 1960. Originally, modern-day Bauchi State was a part of the post-independence Northern Region until 1967 when the region was split and the area became part of the North-Eastern State. After the North-Eastern State was split, Bauchi State was formed on 3 February 1976 alongside ten other states.

Twenty years after statehood, a group of LGAs in the state's west was broken off to form the new Gombe State.

With the creation of Bauchi State in 1976, then comprising present Bauchi and Gombe State, it included 16 local government areas. The number of local government areas in the then Bauchi State was increased to 20 and later to 23. However, in 1997 when Gombe State was created out of Bauchi and additional local governments were created in the country, Bauchi State was left with 20 local government areas as shown below.

Bauchi State has gone through a tremendous transformation over the years. The Ajawa language was spoken in Bauchi State, but became extinct by 1940 as speakers shifted to Hausa. Sharia law was adopted in June 2001.

== Local Government Areas ==
Bauchi State consists of twenty Local Government Areas (LGAs). They are:

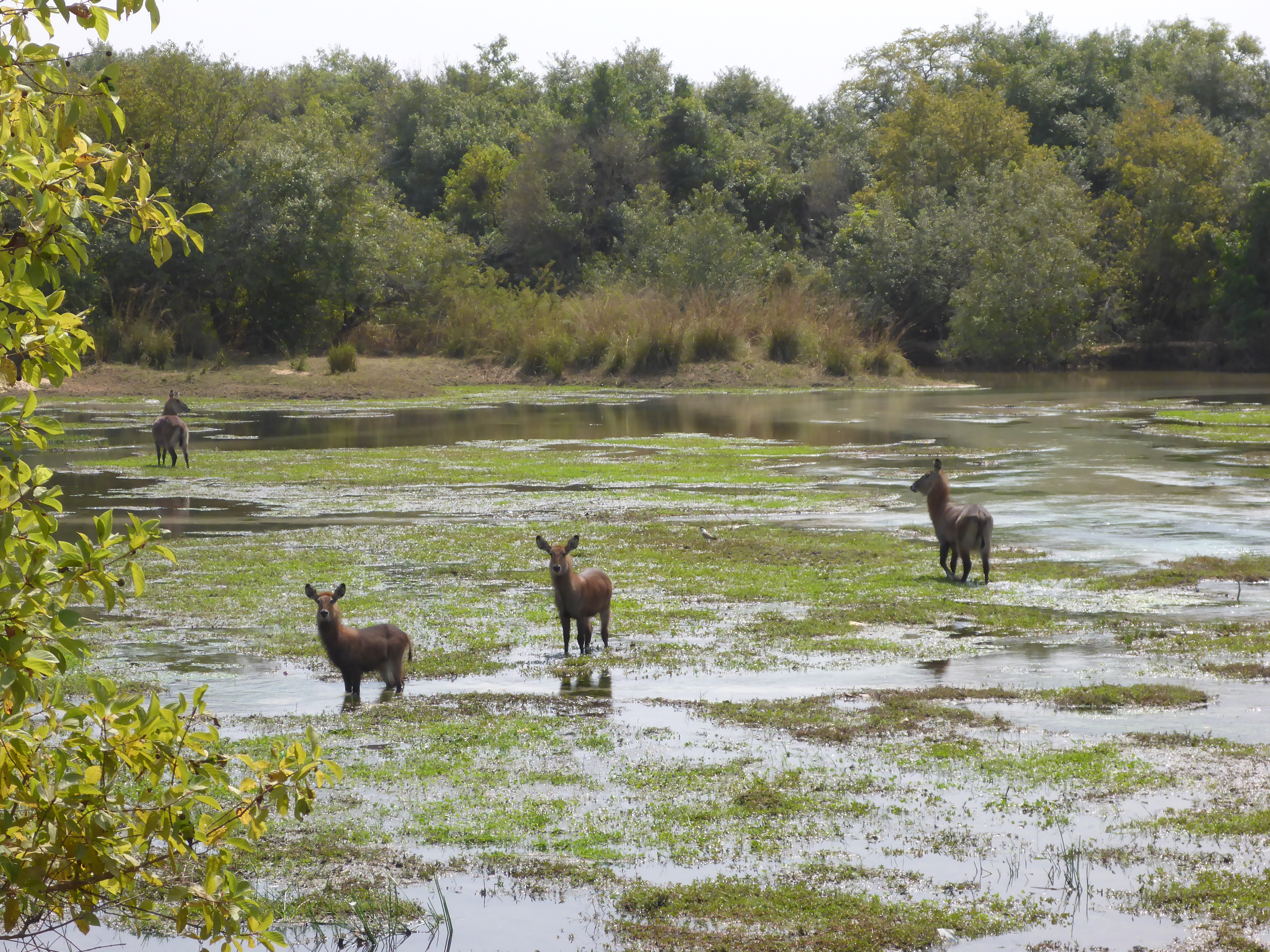
Yankari National Park

LGA	Area (km^{2})	Census 2006 population	Administrative capital	Postal code
Bauchi	3,687	493,810	Bauchi	740
Tafawa Balewa	2,515	219,988	T/Balewa	740
Dass	535	89,943	Dass	740
Toro	6,932	350,404	Toro	740
Bogoro	894	84,215	Bogoro	741
Ningi	4,625	387,192	Ningi	742
Warji	625	114,720	Warji	742
Ganjuwa	5,059	280,468	Kafin Madaki	742
Kirfi	2,371	147,618	Kirfi	743
Alkaleri	5,918	329,424	Alkaleri	743
Southern region totals	33,161	2,497,782		
Darazo	3,015	251,597	Darazo	750
Misau	1,226	263,487	Misau	750
Giade	668	156,969	Giade	750
Shira	1,321	234,014	Yana	750
Jamaare	493	176,883	Jamaare	751
Katagum	1,436	295,970	Azare	751
Itas/Gadau	1,398	229,996	Itas	751
Zaki	1,476	191,457	Katagum	752
Gamawa	2,925	286,388	Gamawa	752
Damban	1,077	150,922	Damban	752
Northern region totals	15,035	2,178,683		

== Geography ==
Bauchi State occupies a total land area of 49,119 km^{2} (18,965 sq mi) representing about 5.3% of Nigeria's total land mass and is located between latitudes 9° 3' and 12° 3' north and longitudes 8° 50' and 11° east.

The state is bordered by seven states, Jigawa to the north, Taraba for 54 km and Plateau for 360 km (220 mi) to the south, Gombe for 277 km (172 mi) to the east, Yobe for 188 km (117 mi) to the north-east, Kaduna to the west for 32 km (20 mi), and Kano for 131 km (81 mi) to the north-west.

Bauchi state is one of the states in the northern part of Nigeria that span two distinctive vegetation zones, namely, the Sudan savannah and the Sahel savannah. The Sudan savannah type of vegetation covers the southern part of the state. Here, the vegetation gets richer and richer towards the south, especially along water sources or rivers, but generally, the vegetation is less uniform and grasses are shorter than what grows even farther south, that is, in the forest zone of the middle belt.

The Sahel type of savannah, also known as semi-desert vegetation, becomes manifest from the middle of the state as one moves from the state's south to its north. This type of vegetation comprises isolated stands of thorny shrubs.

On the other hand, the southwestern part of the state is mountainous as a result of the continuation of the Bauchi Plateau, while the northern part is generally sandy.

The vegetation types as described above are conditioned by the climatic factors, which in turn determine the amount of rainfall received in the area. For instance, the rainfall in Bauchi state ranges between 1,300 millimetres (51 in) per annum in the south and only 700 millimetres (28 in) per annum in the extreme north. This pattern is because in the West Africa sub-region, rains generally come from the south as they are carried by the south-westerlies. There is therefore a progressive dryness towards the north, culminating in the desert condition in the far north. So also is the case in Bauchi state.

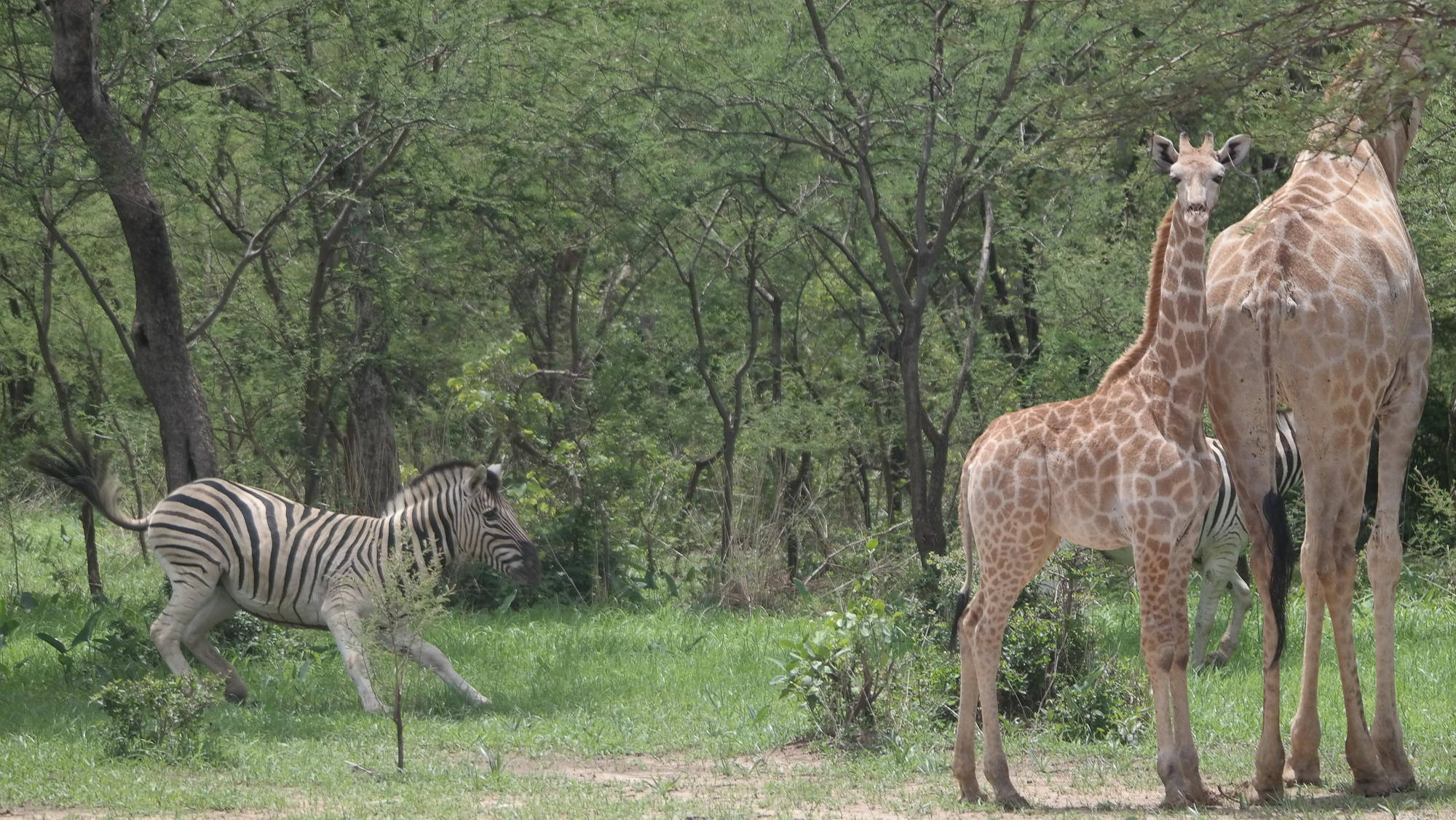
Sumu Wildlife Park

Consequently, rains start earlier in the southern part of the state, where rain is heaviest and lasts longer. Here the rains start in April with the highest record amount of 1,300 millimetres (51 in) per annum. In contrast, the northern part of the state receives the rains late, usually around June or July, and records the highest amount of 700 millimetres (28 in) per annum.

In the same vein, the weather experienced in the south and the north varies considerably. While it is humidly hot during the early part of the rainy season in the south, the hot, dry and dusty weather lingers up north.

In addition to rainfall, Bauchi state is watered by a number of rivers. They include the Gongola and Jama'are rivers.

The Gongola River crosses Bauchi state in Tafawa Balewa Local Government Area in the south and in Kirfi and Alkaleri Local Government Areas in the eastern part of the state, while the Jama’are River cuts across a number of Local Government Areas in the northern part of the state. Moreover, a substantial part of the Hadeja-Jama'are River basin lies in Bauchi state, which along with various fadama (floodplain) areas in the state provides suitable land for agricultural activities. These are further supported by the number of dams meant for irrigation and other purposes. These include the Gubi and Tilde-Fulani dams. There are also lakes such as the Maladumba Lake in Misau Local Government Area that further provide the necessary conditions to support agriculture.

=== Climate ===
Bauchi has an oppressive wet season while the dry season is partly cloudy, and it is hot year-round. Over the year, the temperature also varies.

Like every other state in Nigeria, Bauchi state has not been spared in devastating effects of climate change. On 11 July 2022, the acting Director-general of the Bauchi State Emergency Management Agency (BASEMA), Mr Bala Lame, said "No fewer than 100 houses and several farmlands have been destroyed by devastating floods in Darazo LGA of the state". This he attributed to flooding after three days of persistent rainfall in the area. The average annual temperature ranges from 14 to 38 °C (57 to 100 °F), with occasional exceptions when it falls below 11 °C (51 °F) or rises over 40 °C (104 °F).

The greatest time of year to visit Bauchi for warm-weather activities, according to the tourist score, is from early December to early February.

From 28 February to 10 May is the hot season, which lasts 2.5 months and has an average daily high temperature of over 96 °F. Averaging a high of 99 °F and a low of 74 °F, April is the hottest month of the year in Bauchi.

From 15 July to 1 October, the cool season, which has an average daily high temperature below 86 °F, lasts for 2.6 months. With an average low of 58 °F and high of 90 °F, January is the coldest month of the year in Bauchi.

== Air pollution ==
Particulate matter, which has a diameter of less than 10 microns and is 1/7th the thickness of a human hair, is a significant source of air pollution in Bauchi. These particles, which can include smoke, soot, dust, salt, acids, and metals, pose a serious threat to health because they may be inhaled into the deepest parts of the lungs.

== Erosion ==
Gully erosion, which has swept away bridges, culverts, and homes, is causing alarm among residents of the settlements of Alkaleri and Kirfi in Bauchi State.

== Population ==
Bauchi State has a total of 55 tribal groups which include Gerawa, Sayawa, Jarawa, Kirfawa, Turawa Bolewa, Karai-Karai, Kanuri, Fa'awa, Butawa, Warjawa, Zulawa, Boyawa MBadawa.

There are cultural similarities in the people's language, occupational practices, festivals, dress and there is a high degree of ethnic interaction especially in marriage and economic existence. Some of the ethnic groups have joking relationships that exist between them, e.g. Fulani and Kanuri, Jarawa and Sayawa, etc.

The Durbar Festival is a major annual attraction.

== Education ==
The Abubakar Tafawa Balewa University is located in the capital city Bauchi. Other educational institutions located in the state include Bauchi State University, Abubakar Tatari Ali Polytechnic, Federal Polytechnic, Bauchi and Federal university of health science Azare.

== Transport ==
Federal Highways:

- A3 northeast from Plateau State at Rafin Jaki for 294 km via Bauchi, Darazo, and Lanpo to Yobe State at Baino as part of the Dakar-Ndjamena Trans-Sahelian Highway (Trans-African 5).
- A237 (as part of the Dakar-Ndjamena Trans-Sahelian Highway or TAH 5) east from Jigawa State near Garwa for 90 km as the Kano-Kari Rd via Zigau, Yana, Giade and Misau to A3 at Kari.
- A345 as the Bachi-Bara-Gombe Rd east from Bauchi for 117 km via Alkaleri and Bara to Gombe State at Lariski.

Other major roads:

- the Yana-Azare Rd north from A237 at Yana to Azare.
- the Azare-Katagum Rd north from Azare via Gadau, Chibiyyi and Sakwa to Katagum.
- southeast from Katagum via Gamawa and Lafia to Yobe State at Zindiwa.
- the Azare-Potiskum Rd east from Azare via Bulkachuwa, Damban and Dagauda to Yobe State.
- the Alkeleri-Kirfi Rd north from A345 at Budawaire along the east bank of the Gongola River to Gombe State as the Kunde-Riban-Gau Rd.
- the Ningi Rd north from A3 in Bauchi via Kafin Madaki to Miya.
- The Miya-Warji Rd north from Miya via Baima
- the Warji-Gwaram Rd east to Jigawa State
- the Jengre-Ningi Rd north from Plateau State at Zarya to Ningi.
- the Ningi-Zakara Rd east to Zakara where the Zakara-Miya Rd continues east.
- the Ningi-Shamaki Rd north to Jigawa State at Shabaki.
- the Munchia-Zanabi-Jerkoya-Matugiwa Rd.
- The Lumbu-Fulani Rd east via Jigawa and Gwom to Shabaki.
- northeast from A3 at Darazo to Jigawa State at Basirka.

Railways:

- The 1067 mm Cape gauge Eastern Line east from Jos in Plateau State to Gombe State.

Airport:

- Bauchi Airport Sir Abubakar Tafawa Balewa International Airport, 23 km north of Bauchi, near the village of Durum, replaced Bauchi Airport in 2014, with regular services to Abuja.

== Languages ==
West Chadic language groups spoken in Bauchi State:

- North Bauchi languages
- South Bauchi languages

Languages of Bauchi State listed by LGA:

LGA	Languages
Alkaleri	Dass; Bole; Duguri; Giiwo; Guruntum-Mbaaru; Labir; Tangale
Bauchi	Bankal; Duguri; Dulbu; Galambu; Gera; Geruma; Giiwo; Guruntum-Mbaaru; Ju; Kir-Balar; Labir; Luri; Mangas; Mbat; Pa'a; Polci; Shiki; Tala; Zangwal
Bogoro	Sayawa(Za'ar)
Dambam	Karai-karai
Darazo	Bole; Deno; Diri; Giiwo; Mburku; Ngamo; Zumbun
Dass	Bankal; Dass; Gwak; Polci; Saya; Shall-Zwall; Zari
Dukku	Bole
Gamawa	Karai-karai
Ganjuwa	Ciwogai; Gera; Geruma; Jimi; Kariya; Kubi; Miya
Kirfi	Bure
Misau	Fulato/Borno; Shuwa; Kanuri; Hausa; Fulani; Karai-karai
Ningi	Diri; Gamo-Ningi; Kudu-Camo; Pa'a; Siri; Warji; Geruma
Tafawa Balewa	Sur; Vaghat-Ya-Bijim-Legeri; Zari; Bankal; Gwak; Izere; Sayawa(Za'ar); Angas
Toro	Bankal; Dass; Geji; Geruma; Gwa; Gyem; Iguta; Izere; Jere; Lame; Angas;Lemoro; Mawa; Panawa; Polci; Sanga; Saya; Shau; Tunzuii; Zari; Zeem; Ziriya
Zaki	Bade

Other languages of Bauchi State are Ajawa, Beele, Kanuri, Kwaami, Manga, Pero, and Piya-Kwonci.

== Government ==
See also: List of governors of Bauchi State

Like all Nigerian states, the executive arm of the state government is headed by a governor who is eligible for a re-election once.

As at 2019, the governor of Bauchi State is Bala Mohammed, who emerged victorious in the 9 March 2019 Governorship election with the political party PDP. He was sworn in on 29 May 2019, making him the 6th democratic governor of Bauchi State and the 16th governor of Bauchi State overall. Baba Tela serves as the deputy governor of Bauchi State.

== Politics ==
The State government is led by a democratically elected governor who works closely with members of the state's House of Assembly. The Capital city of the State is Bauchi.

The electoral system of to the state is selected using a modified two-round system. To be elected in the first round, a candidate must receive the plurality of the vote and over 25% of the vote in at least two-thirds of the State local government Areas. If no candidate passes the threshold, a second round will be held between the top candidate and the next candidate to have received a plurality of votes in the highest number of local government Areas.

== Emirates and Chiefdoms ==
Currently, there are twenty (20) traditional institutions in Bauchi State comprising 19 emirates and 1 chiefdom as follows:

S/N	Name	Headquarters	Local Government Area (LGA)
1	Bauchi Emirate	Bauchi	Bauchi
2	Katagum Emirate	Azare	Katagum
3	Misau Emirate	Misau	Misau
4	Ningi Emirate	Ningi	Ningi
5	Jama’are Emirate	Jama’are	Jama’are
6	Dass Emirate	Dass	Dass
7	Burra Emirate	Burra	Ningi
8	Dambam Emirate	Dambam	Dambam
9	Darazo Emirate	Darazo	Darazo
10	Duguri Emirate	Yuli	Alkaleri
11	Gamawa Emirate	Gamawa	Gamawa
12	Giade Emirate	Giade	Giade
13	Toro Emirate	Toro	Toro
14	Warji Emirate	Katangar Warji	Warji
15	Ari Emirate	Gadar Maiwa	Itas/Gadau
16	Jama’a Emirate (Bauchi State)	Nabardo	Toro
17	Lame Emirate	Gumau	Toro
18	Bununu Emirate	Bununu	Tafawa Balewa
19	Lere Emirate (Bauchi State)	Lere	Tafawa Balewa
20	Zaar Chiefdom	Mhrim	Tafawa Balewa

== Notable people ==
- Abubakar Tafawa Balewa, first and only Prime Minister of Nigeria
- Jude Rabo, vice-chancellor of Federal University, Wukari
- Sa'adu Zungur, poet and revolutionary
- Bala Muhammed, (born 1958) Nigerian politician and the Bauchi state Governor since 2019.
- Muhammed Abdullahi Abubakar (born 1956) former Bauchi state Governor from 2015 to 2019.
- Isa Yuguda, (born 1956) a Nigerian politician and former Bauchi State Governor from 2007 to 2015.
- Dahiru Mohammed, a Nigerian politician and former Bauchi State Governor
- Adamu Mu'azu, a Nigerian politician and former Bauchi State Governor
- Yayale Ahmed, a Nigerian politician and civil servant
- Zainab Bulkachuwa, a Nigerian judge
- Ahmed Aliyu Jalam, a Nigerian politician and former Bauchi State Commissionera
- Zadok Yohanna, a professional footballer

== See also ==
- Bauchi Light Railway

== Gallery ==
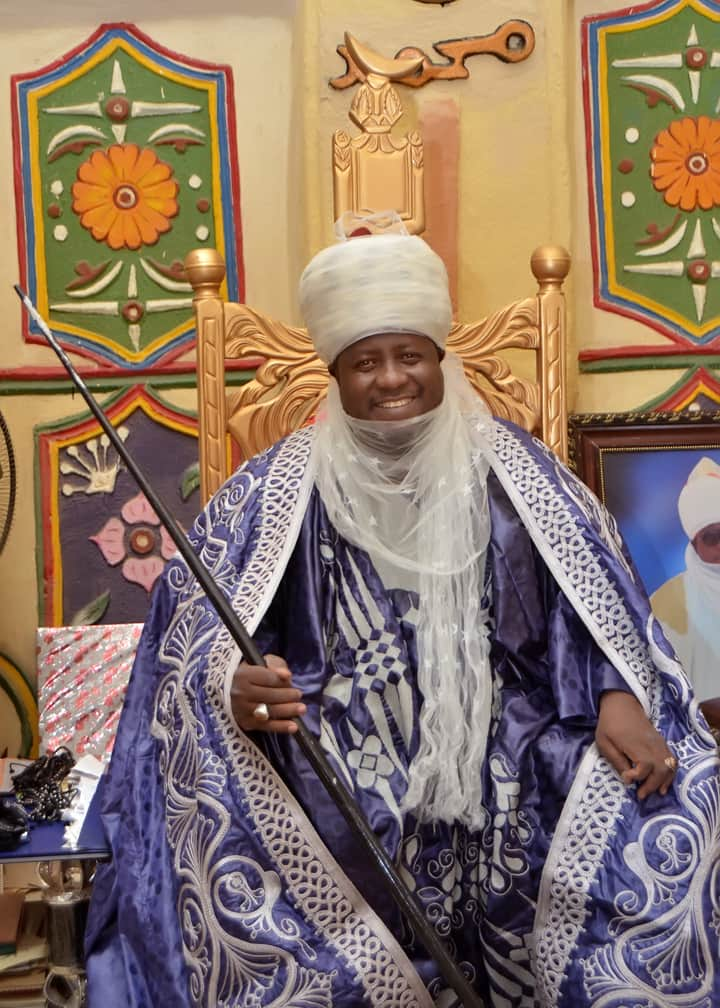

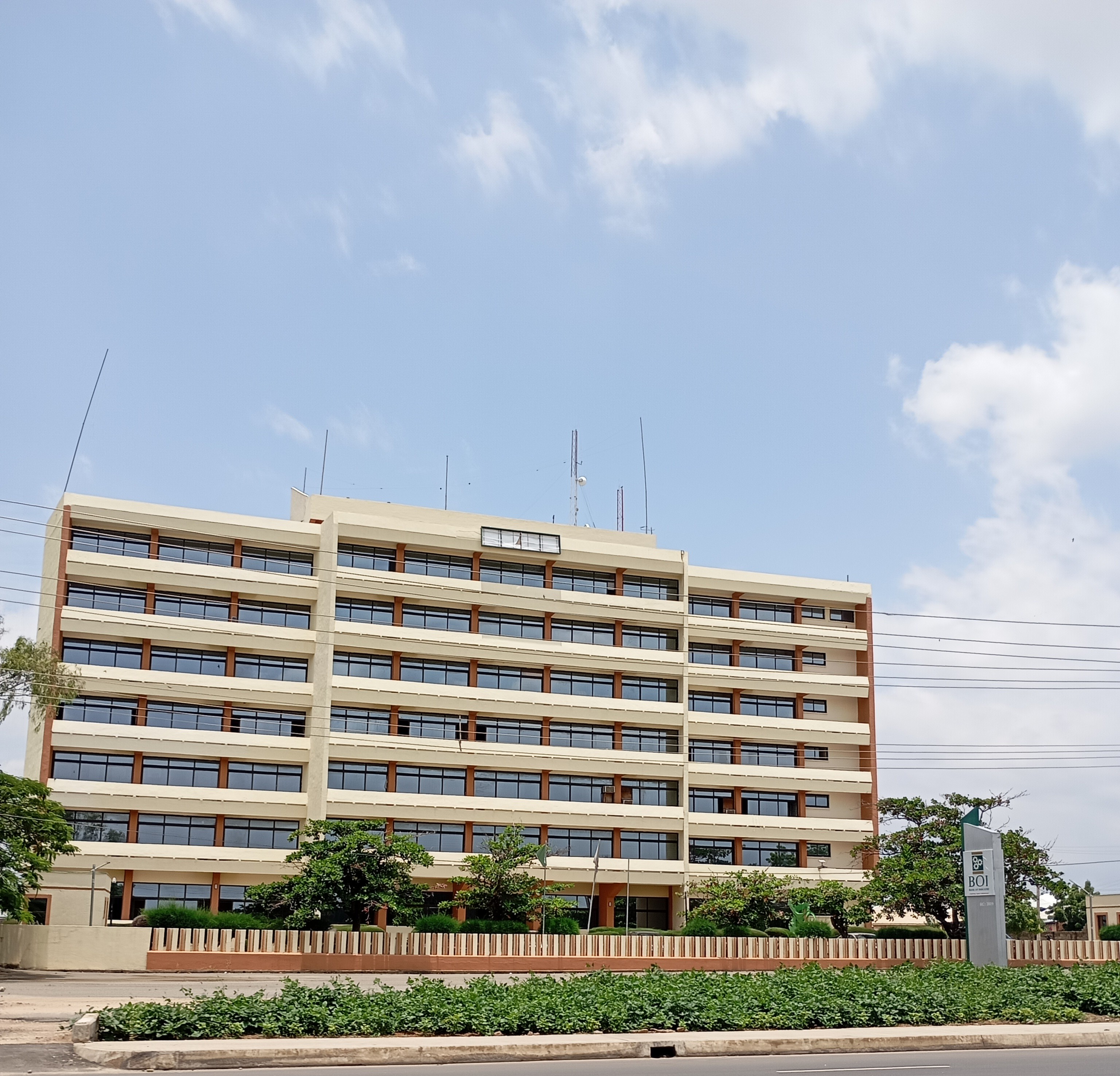

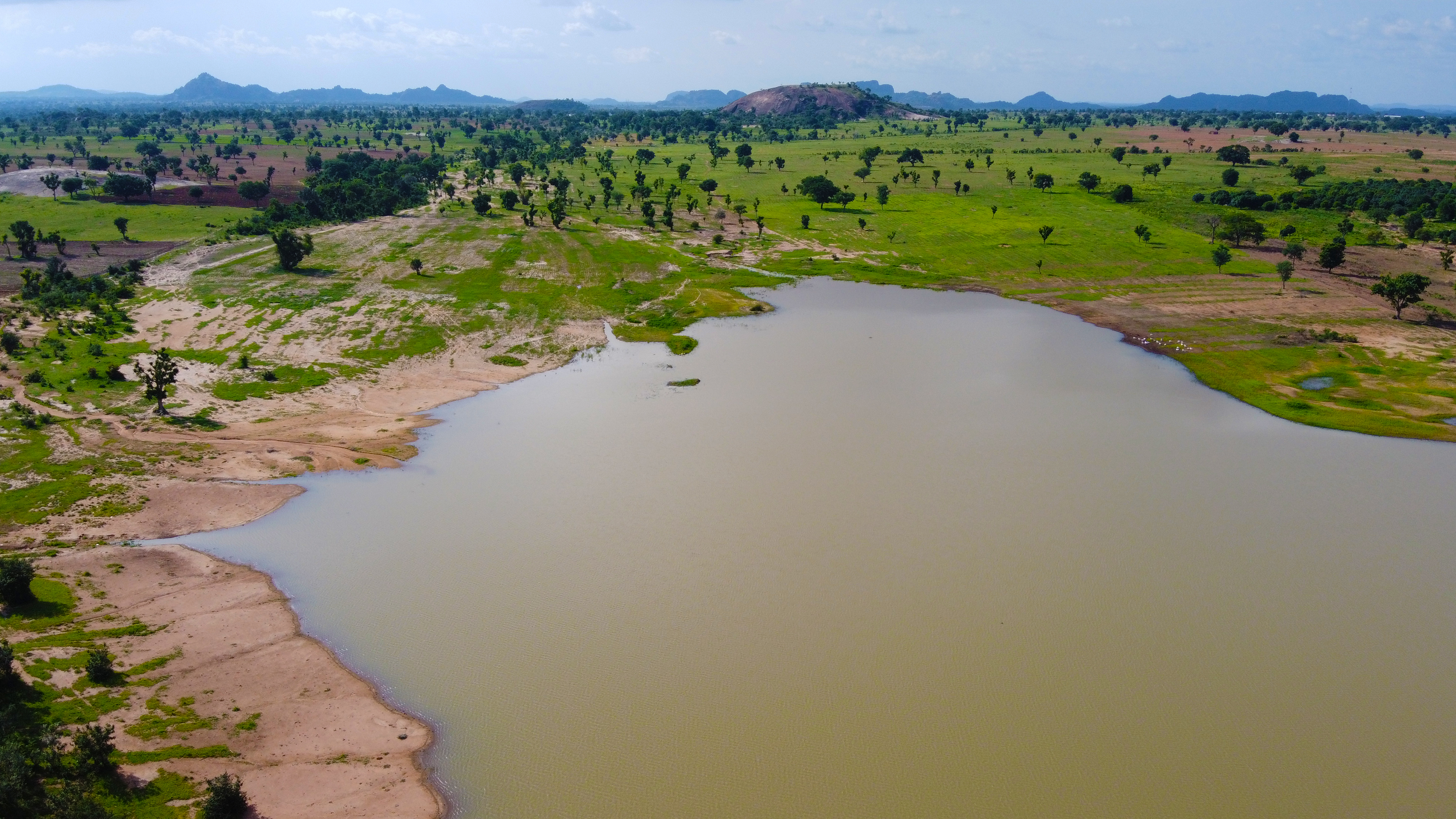

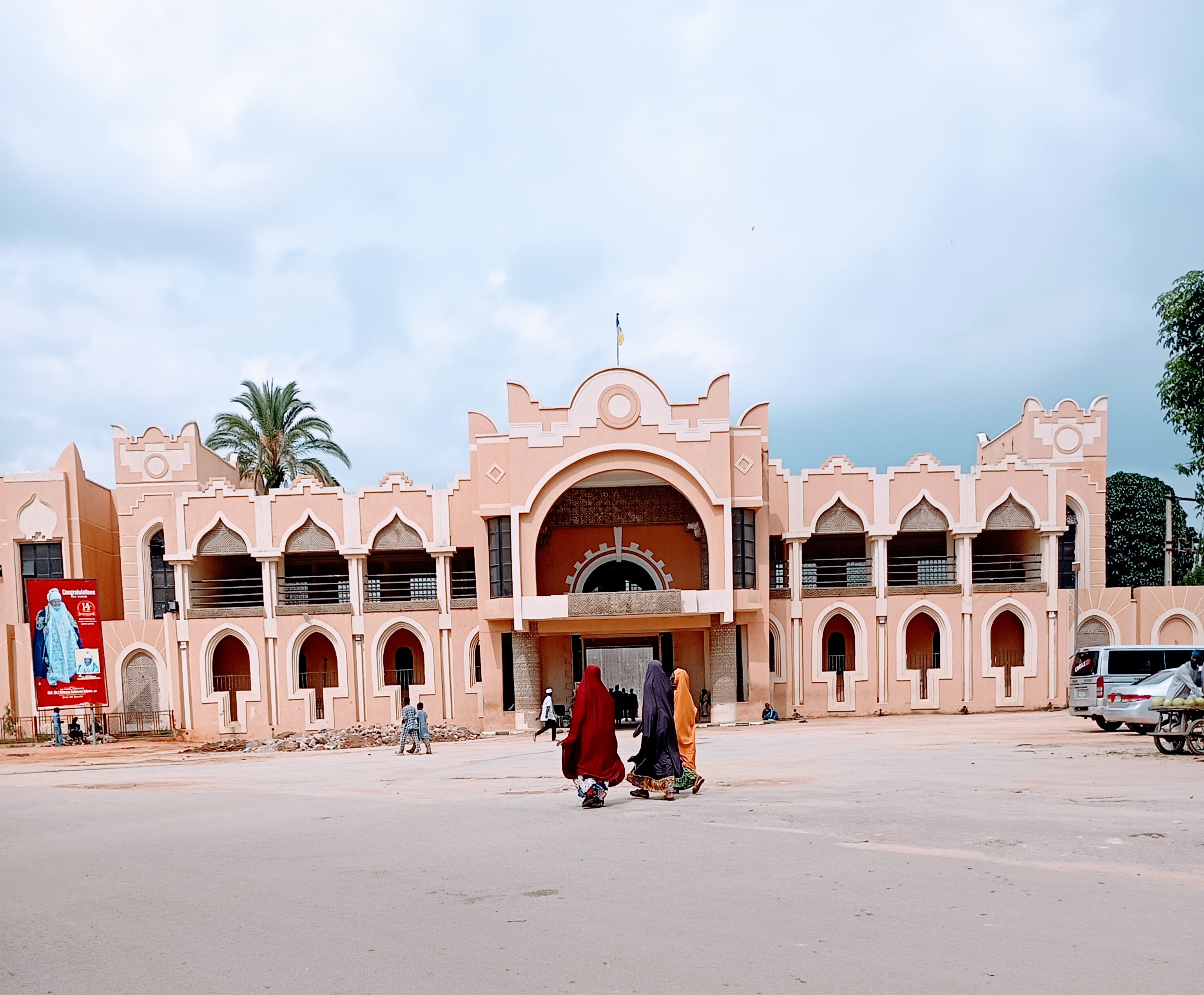

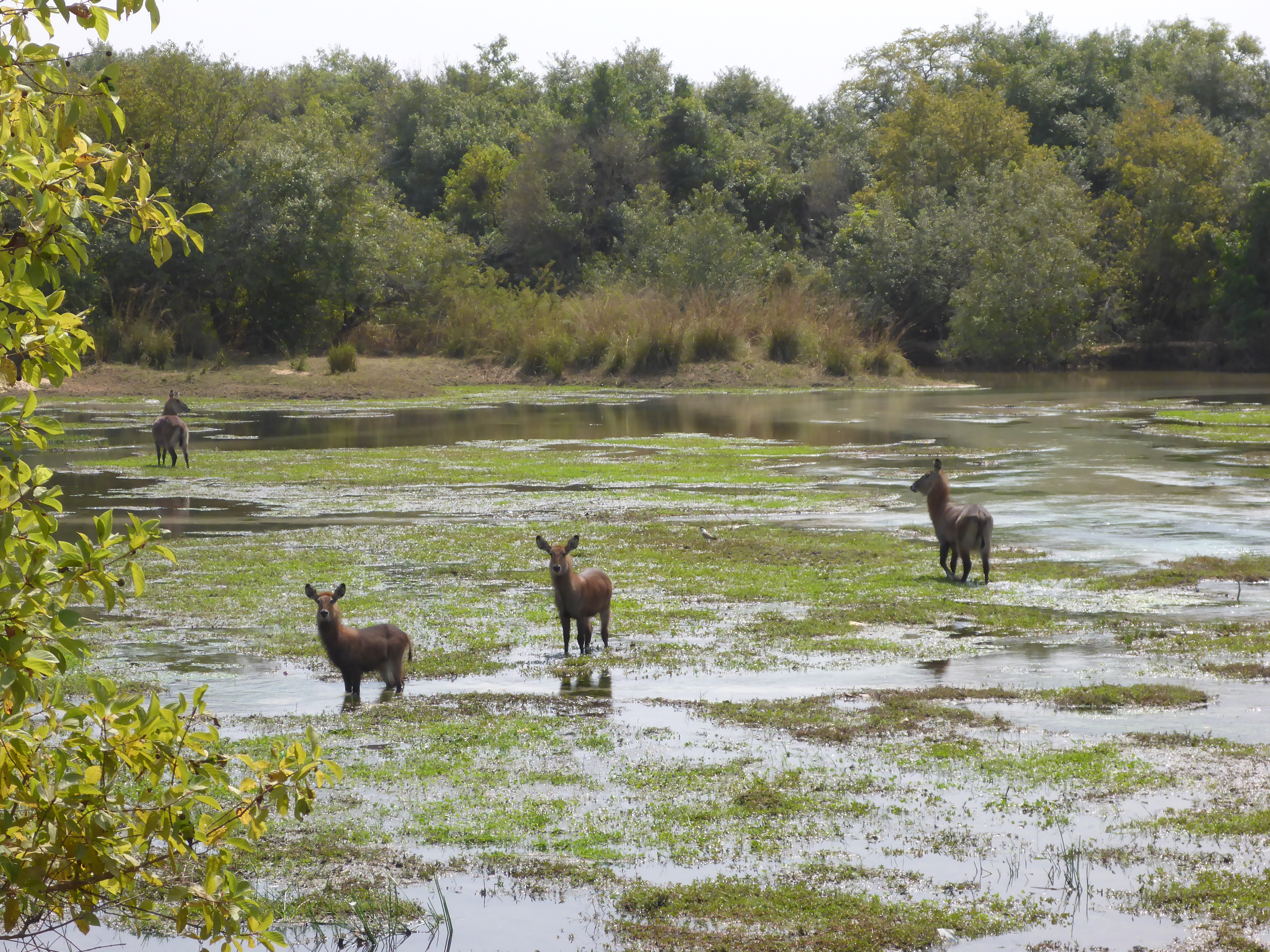

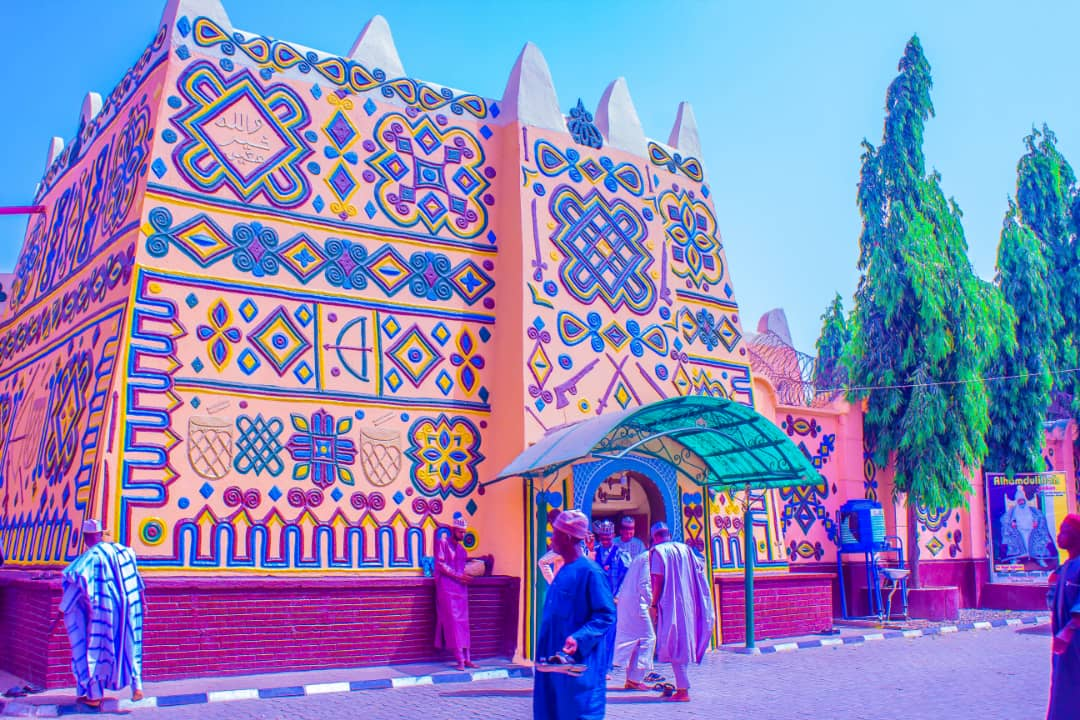

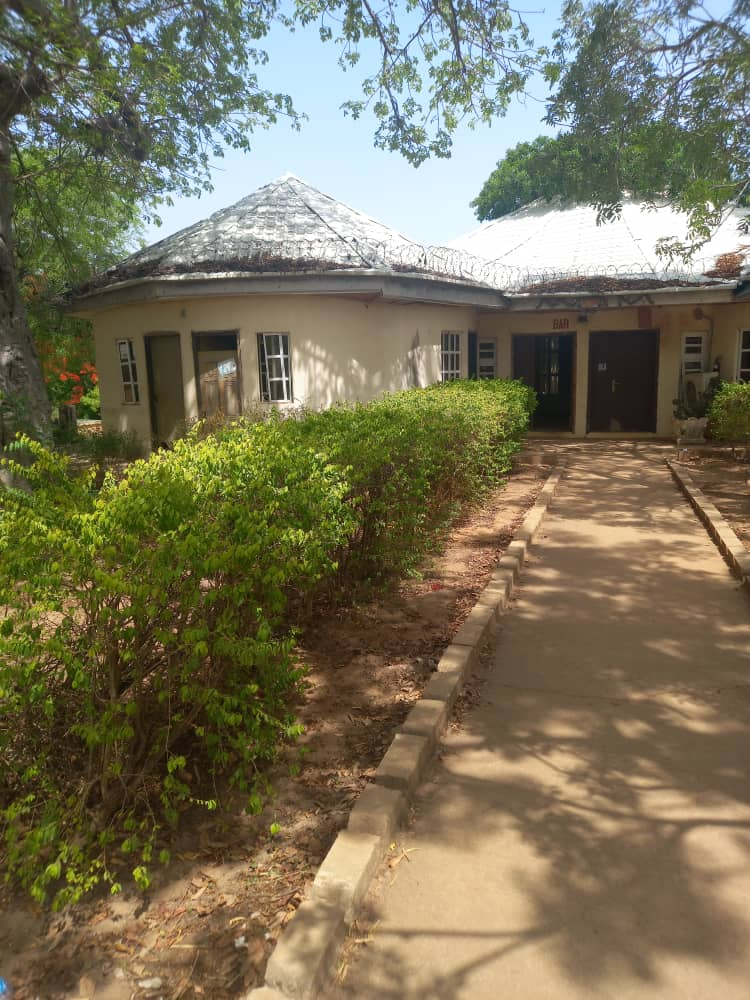

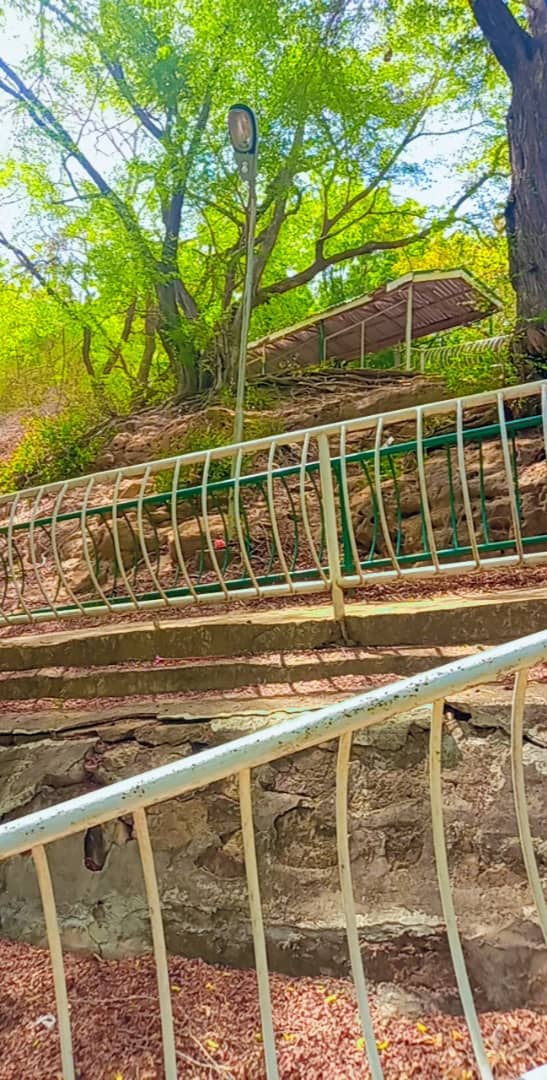

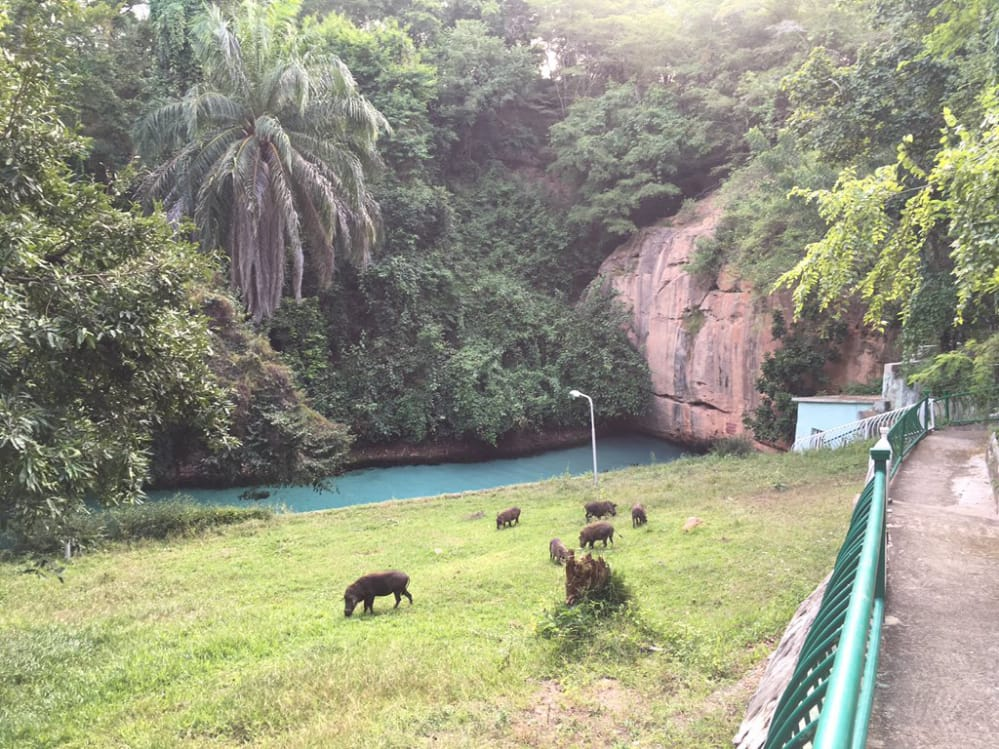

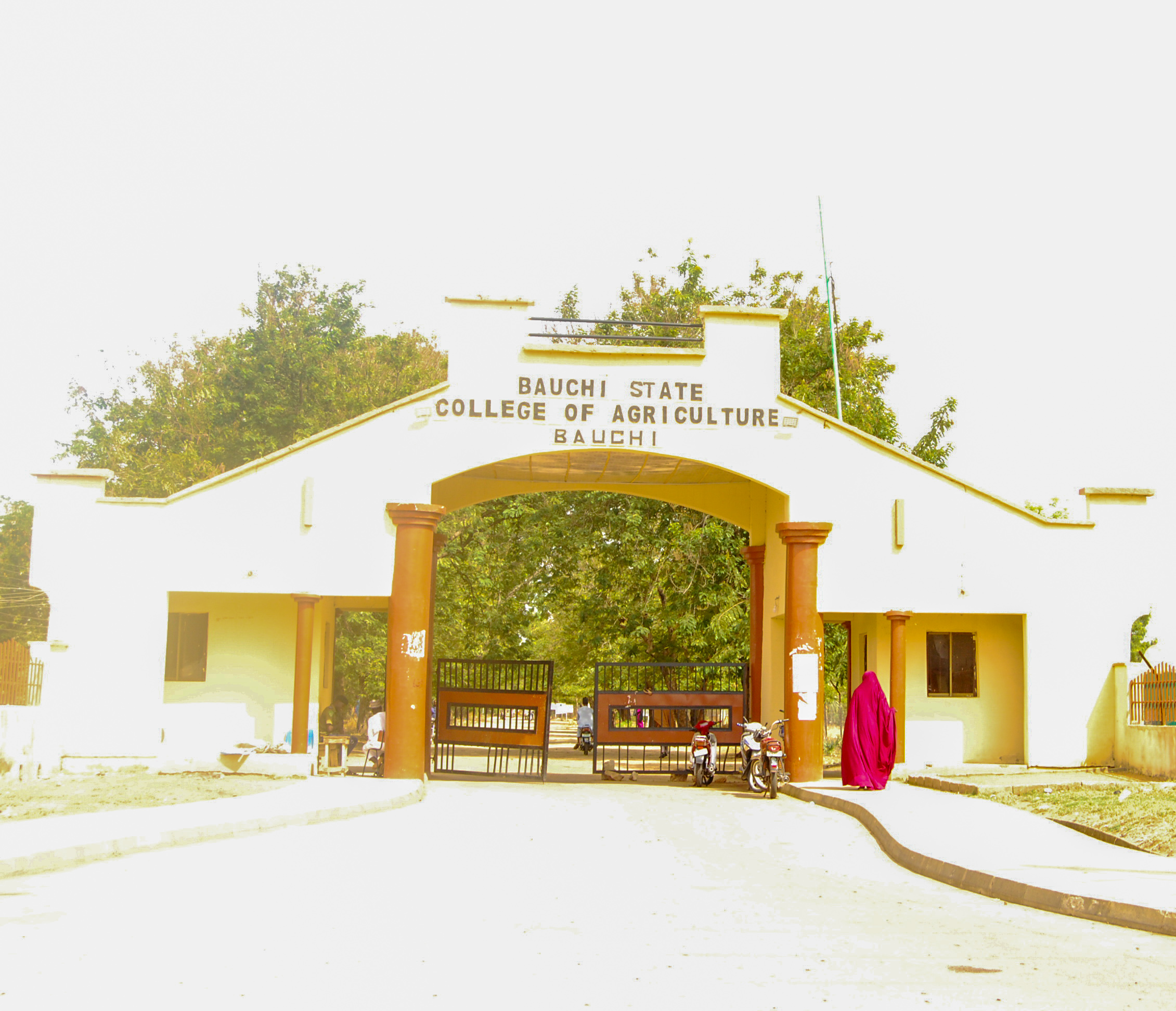

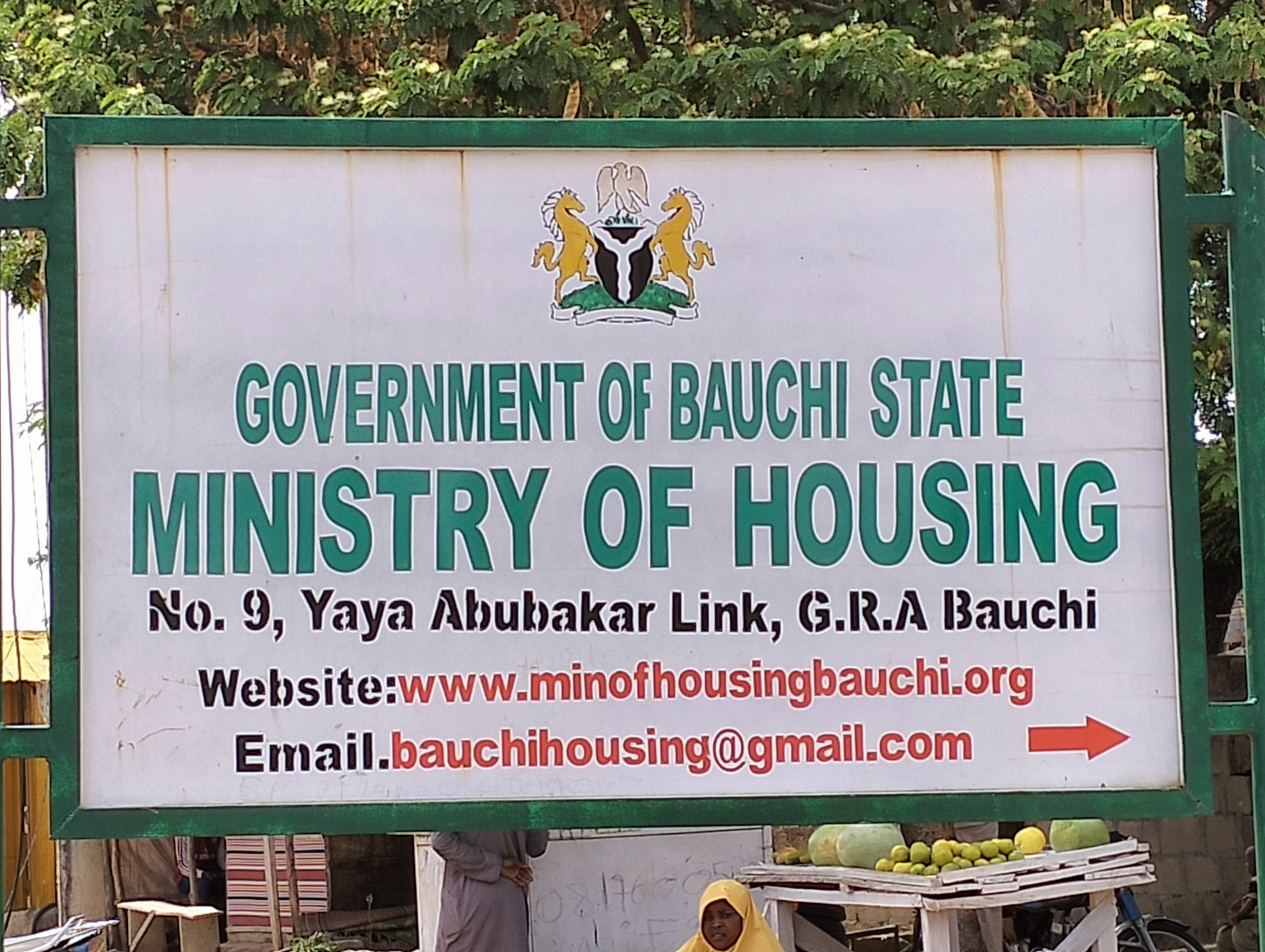

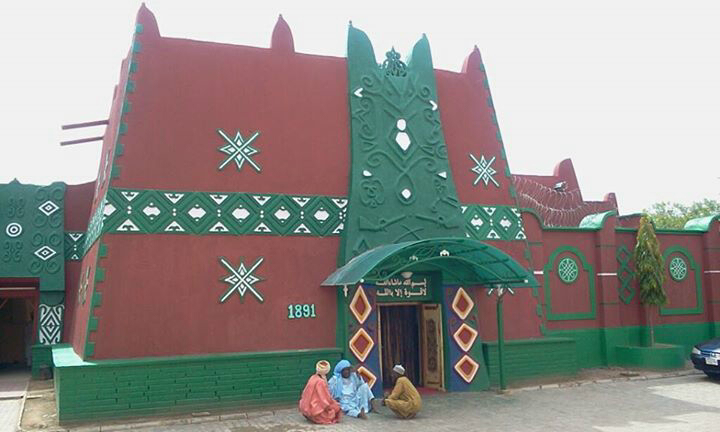

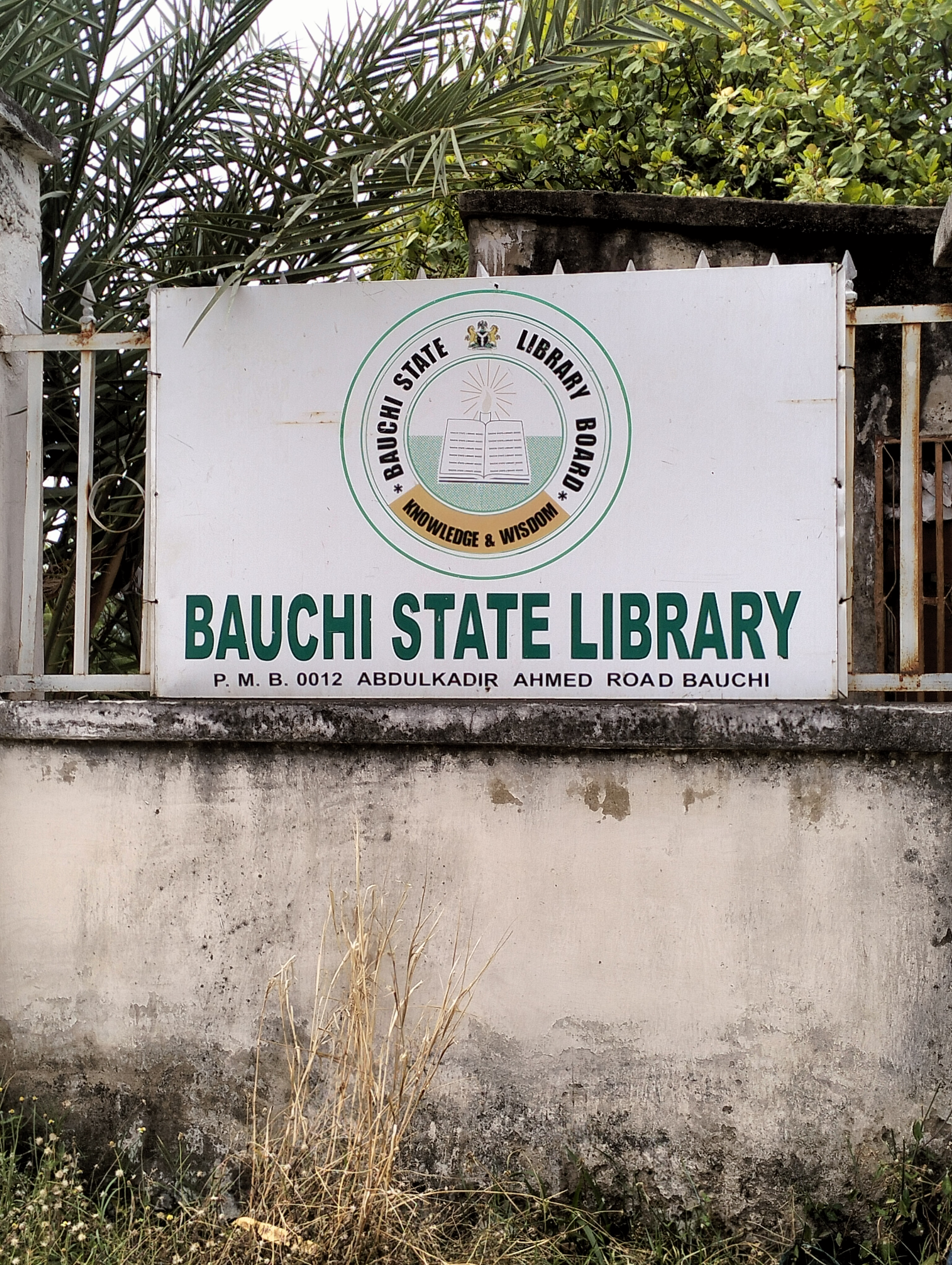
