= 2011 Nigerian Senate elections in Bauchi State =

The 2011 Nigerian Senate election in Bauchi State was held on April 11, 2011, to elect members of the Nigerian Senate to represent Bauchi State. Abdul Ahmed Ningi representing Bauchi Central, Adamu Gumba Ibrahim representing Bauchi South and. Babayo Garba Gamawa representing Bauchi North all won on the platform of People's Democratic Party.

== Overview ==
Affiliation	Party			Total
Affiliation	ACN	PDP	ANPP	Total
Before Election	1	0	2	3
After Election	0	3	0	3

== Summary ==
District	Incumbent	Party	Elected Senator	Party
Bauchi Central	Mohammed A Muhammad	ANPP	Abdul Ahmed Ningi	PDP
Bauchi South	Bala Mohammed	ANPP	Adamu Ibrahim Gumba	PDP
Bauchi North	Sulaiman Mohammed Nazif	ACN	Babayo Garba Gamawa	PDP

== Results ==
=== Bauchi Central ===
People's Democratic Party candidate Ahmed Ningi won the election, defeating Action Congress of Nigeria candidate Isah Hamma Misau and other party candidates.

2011 Nigerian Senate election in Bauchi State
Party	Candidate	Votes	%
PDP	Abdul Ahmed Ningi		
APC	Isah Hamma		
Total votes			
PDP hold			

=== Bauchi South ===
People's Democratic Party candidate Ibrahim Adamu Gumba won the election, defeating other party candidates.

2011 Nigerian Senate election in Bauchi State
Party	Candidate	Votes	%
PDP	Adamu Gumba		
APC	-		
Total votes			
PDP hold			

=== Bauchi North ===
People's Democratic Party candidate Babayo Garba Gamawa won the election, defeating Action Congress of Nigeria candidate Faruq Mustapha and other party candidates.

2011 Nigerian Senate election in Bauchi State
Party	Candidate	Votes	%
PDP	Babayo Garba Gamawa		
APC	Faruq Mustapha		
Total votes			
PDP hold			
