= Audu Sule Katagum =

Nigerian architect and politician (1956/1957–2026)

- Katagum in 2018

Deputy Governor of Bauchi State
- In office 2 July 2018 – 29 May 2019
- Governor: Mohammed Abdullahi Abubakar
- Preceded by: Nuhu Gidado
- Succeeded by: Baba Tela

Chief of Staff to the Governor of Bauchi State
- Governor: Mohammed Abdullahi Abubakar

Personal details
- Born: 1956 or 1957 Bauchi State, Nigeria
- Died: 20 June 2026 (aged 69)
- Party: All Progressives Congress
- Relations: Sule Katagum (father)
- Occupation: Architect; politician
- Known for: Wazirin Katagum

Audu Sule Katagum (1956 or 1957 – 20 June 2026) was a Nigerian politician, architect and the Wazirin Katagum of Katagum. He served as the deputy governor of Bauchi state from 2018 to 2019 under Governor Mohammed Abdullahi Abubakar. Before his elevation to deputy governor, he was the Chief of Staff at the Bauchi State Government House.

== Early life and education ==
Audu Sule Katagum was born in Bauchi State, Nigeria and trained as an architect, a profession he practised before entering government service. He was a son of Alhaji Sule Katagum (1927 - 2017), the first chairman of Nigeria's Federal Public Service Commission and himself a holder of the title of Wazirin Katagum.

== Political career ==
=== Chief of Staff ===
Katagum served as Chief of Staff at the Bauchi State Government House during the first administration of Governor Mohammed Abdullahi Abubakar of the All Progressives Congress (APC). He remained in that role until June 2018, when the governor nominated him to fill a vacancy in the office of deputy governor.

=== Deputy Governor of Bauchi State (2018–2019) ===
Katagum's path to the deputy governorship opened on 24 May 2018, when Nuhu Gidado resigned, citing a "dampened spirit" for the job. In early June, Governor Abubakar nominated Katagum after what was described as wide consultation with APC stakeholders in the state.

The Bauchi State House of Assembly screened and confirmed the nomination on 29 June 2018 in a plenary session that lasted less than five minutes. The speaker, Kawuwa Shehu Damina, presided, and the confirmation motion was moved by Abdullahi Abdulkadir of Bura constituency and seconded by Ibrahim Katagum, who represented Katagum constituency.

Katagum took the oaths of office and allegiance on 2 July 2018 at the multi-purpose indoor sports hall in Bauchi. With the state's chief judge away in Abuja, the oaths were administered by the Grand Khadi of Bauchi State, Dahiru Abubakar Ningi. In a short acceptance speech, he pledged to work for the people of Bauchi for the remainder of the administration's term.

He served until the end of the Abubakar administration on 29 May 2019 and was succeeded by Baba Tela under the incoming PDP governor, Bala Mohammed.

=== After leaving office ===
In 2023, ahead of Governor Mohammed's swearing-in for a second term, Katagum chaired a state government transition committee that reviewed the performance of Bauchi's ministries, departments and agencies.

Speaking at the first Sustainable Development Goals Youth Summit held in Bauchi in October 2024, he warned that economic hardship and the perceived neglect of young Nigerians could push the country towards a youth-led revolt, and blamed what he called a missing national philosophy and a lack of accountability among the country's leaders.

== Wazirin Katagum ==
In February 2024, the Emir of Katagum, Umar Farooq II, turbaned Katagum as the new Wazirin Katagum at the emirate palace, conferring on him a title last held by his late father. Governor Bala Mohammed, represented by his deputy Auwal Jatau, attended the ceremony and described the appointment as well deserved, citing Katagum's record as deputy governor.

== Death ==
Katagum died on 20 June 2026, at the age of 69.

Political offices
| Preceded by Nuhu Gidado | Deputy Governor of Bauchi State; 2018 - 2019 | Succeeded by Baba Tela |
