= 2015 Nigerian Senate elections in Bauchi State =

2015 Nigerian Senate election in Bauchi State

The 2015 Nigerian Senate election in Bauchi State was held on March 28, 2015, to elect members of the Nigerian Senate to represent Bauchi State. Isah Hamma representing Bauchi Central, Malam Wakili representing Bauchi South and Sulaiman Mohammed Nazif representing Bauchi North all won on the platform of All Progressives Congress.

== Overview ==
Affiliation	Party		Total
Affiliation	APC	PDP	Total
Before Election			3
After Election	3	–	3

== Summary ==
District	Incumbent	Party	Elected Senator	Party
Bauchi Central			Isah Hamma	APC
Bauchi South			Malam Wakili	APC
Bauchi North			Sulaiman Mohammed Nazif	APC

== Results ==
=== Bauchi Central ===
All Progressives Congress candidate Isah Hamma won the election, defeating People's Democratic Party candidate Abdul Ahmed Ningi and other party candidates.

2015 Nigerian Senate election in Bauchi State
Party	Candidate	Votes	%
APC	Isah Hamma		
PDP	Abdul Ahmed Ningi		
Total votes			
APC hold			

=== Bauchi South ===
All Progressives Congress candidate Malam Wakili won the election, defeating People's Democratic Party candidate Isa Yuguda and other party candidates.

2015 Nigerian Senate election in Bauchi State
Party	Candidate	Votes	%
APC	Malam Wakili		
PDP	Isa Yuguda		
Total votes			
APC hold			

=== Bauchi North ===
All Progressives Congress candidate Sulaiman Mohammed Nazif won the election, defeating People's Democratic Party candidate Farouk Mustapha and other party candidates.

2015 Nigerian Senate election in Bauchi State
Party	Candidate	Votes	%
APC	Sulaiman Mohammed Nazif		
PDP	Farouk Mustapha		
Total votes			
APC hold			
