= 2007 Nigerian Senate elections in Bauchi State =

2007 Nigerian Senate election in Bauchi State

The 2007 Nigerian Senate election in Bauchi State was held on April 21, 2007, to elect members of the Nigerian Senate to represent Bauchi State. Mohammed A. Muhammed representing Bauchi Central and Bala Mohammed representing Bauchi South won on the platform of All Nigeria Peoples Party, while Sulaiman Mohammed Nazif representing Bauchi North won on the platform of the Action Congress.

== Overview ==
Affiliation	Party		Total
Affiliation	AC	ANPP	Total
Before Election			3
After Election	1	2	3

== Summary ==
District	Incumbent	Party	Elected Senator	Party
Bauchi Central			Mohammed A. Muhammed	ANPP
Bauchi South			Bala Mohammed	ANPP
Bauchi North			Sulaiman Mohammed Nazif	AC

== Results ==
=== Bauchi Central ===
The election was won by Mohammed A. Muhammed of the All Nigeria Peoples Party.

2007 Nigerian Senate election in Bauchi State
Party	Candidate	Votes	%
ANPP	Mohammed A. Muhammed		
Total votes			
ANPP hold			

=== Bauchi South ===
The election was won by Bala Mohammed of the All Nigeria Peoples Party.

2007 Nigerian Senate election in Bauchi State
Party	Candidate	Votes	%
ANPP	Bala Mohammed		
Total votes			
ANPP hold			

=== Bauchi North ===
The election was won by Sulaiman Mohammed Nazif of the Action Congress.

2007 Nigerian Senate election in Bauchi State
Party	Candidate	Votes	%
AC	Sulaiman Mohammed Nazif		
Total votes			
AC hold			
