= Commonwealth Scholarship and Fellowship Plan =

International programme, established 1959

The Commonwealth Scholarship and Fellowship Plan (CSFP) is an international programme under which Commonwealth governments offer scholarships and fellowships to citizens of other Commonwealth countries.

== History ==
The plan was originally proposed by Canadian statesman Sidney Earle Smith in a speech in Montreal on 1 September 1958 and was established in 1959, at the first Conference of Commonwealth Education Ministers (CCEM) held in Oxford, Great Britain. Since then, over 25,000 individuals have held awards, hosted by over twenty countries. The CSFP is one of the primary mechanisms of pan-Commonwealth exchange.

== Organisation ==
There is no central body which manages the CSFP. Instead, participation is based on a series of bi-lateral arrangements between home and host countries. The participation of each country is organised by a national nominating agency, which is responsible for advertising awards applicable to their own country and making nominations to host countries.

The United Kingdom remains the largest contributor to the Commonwealth Scholarship and Fellowship Plan (CSFP). In the UK, Commonwealth Scholarships are administered by the Commonwealth Scholarship Commission in the UK (CSC), an executive non departmental public body of the Foreign, Commonwealth & Development Office (FCDO). The CSC is funded by the FCDO through an annual Grant-in-Aid with a number of its scholarships supported through partnerships with UK universities.

The former Department for International Development (DFID), who previously funded the scheme, merged with the Foreign and Commonwealth Office in 2020 to form the FCDO. In recent years, FCDO-funded Commonwealth Scholarships have focused on Sustainable Development Goals and primarily targeted at candidates from OECD defined low- and middle-income Commonwealth countries, with more limited provision for OECD defined high-income countries.

Participation in the CSFP is voluntary and varies by country; while some countries no longer offer scholarships under the Plan, others—including the United Kingdom and a small number of Commonwealth partners—continue to provide awards through a mix of government, institutional, and partnership funding.

New reforms were developed to strategically align scholarships with mutual interests for business and innovation between Commonwealth nations. During the state visit of President Tony Tan to the UK in October 2014, Her Majesty Queen Elizabeth II announced that the Royal Commonwealth Society of Singapore would be re-established to promote the Commonwealth and to provide new Commonwealth Scholarships and Fellowships in Innovation for Singaporeans. The first Commonwealth Scholarship and Fellowship for Innovation were presented in August 2017 to Joshua Cheong and Dr Khoo Hsien Hui by Sajid Javid.

== Notable past Commonwealth Scholars and Fellows ==
=== Politics ===
- Kenny Anthony, Prime Minister of St. Lucia
- George Brandis QC, 36th Attorney-General of Australia
- Ross Cranston, Member of Parliament for Dudley North, United Kingdom of Great Britain and Northern Ireland
- Bill English, Prime Minister of New Zealand
- Babalola Borishade, Former Minister of Education, Aviation Nigeria
- Dorothy A DeGabriele, Judge in the High Court, Criminal Division, Malawi
- John Alexander Forrest, Member for Mallee, Australia
- Leslie Gunawardana, Former Minister of Science, Sri Lanka
- Hala Hameed, Maldivian Minister of State
- Juma Athuman Kapuya, Minister of Labour, Employment and Youth Development
- Kalombo Mwansa, Home Affairs Minister of Zambia
- Satendra Nandan, Minister of Health and Social Welfare, Fiji
- Rolph Payet, Seychellois Cabinet Minister
- Kamla Persad-Bissessar, Prime Minister of Trinidad and Tobago
- Carlos Simons, Member, Interim Advisory Council, Turks and Caicos Islands
- Abdullah Tarmugi, Singaporean politician and MP
- Michael Tate, Minister for Justice, Australia

=== Judiciary ===
- Shirani Bandaranayake, 43rd Chief Justice of Sri Lanka
- Patrick Keane, Judge of the High Court of Australia
- Ross Cranston, Former Solicitor General of the United Kingdom of Great Britain and Northern Ireland
- George W. Kanyeihamba, Judge of the Supreme Court of Uganda
- Professor Vijender Kumar, Professor of Family Law, NALSAR University of Law
- Lord Thomas of Cwmgiedd, Lord Chief Justice of England and Wales
- Yahya Afridi, 30th Chief Justice of Pakistan

=== Government ===
- Mark Carney, former Governor of the Bank of England, in 2025 became Prime Minister of Canada
- Michael Omolewa, Permanent Delegate and Ambassador to UNESCO, Nigeria
- Carolyn McMaster, Canadian Deputy High Commissioner to New Zealand
- Manumatavai Tupou-Roosen, Director General of the Pacific Islands Forum Fisheries Agency
- Gurjot S. Kaler, An Indian police officer who serves as a Superintendent of Police in the Punjab Police.

=== Academia ===
- Najma Akhtar, Vice Chancellor of Jamia Millia Islamia
- U. R. Ananthamurthy, professor and writer, University of Mysore, Karnataka
- Gunapala Amarasinghe, professor of apediatrics, Institute of Indigenous Medicine, University of Colombo
- Anisuzzaman (1937-2020), professor of Bengali, University of Dhaka
- Anisuzzaman (born 1951), professor of philosophy, former vice-chancellor, Global University Bangladesh
- Richard Alexander Arnold, professor of English, Alfaisal University in Riyadh
- Ishbel Campbell, British chemist researcher and lecturer. Held one of the first Commonwealth fellowships awarded to a woman.
- Robert M. Carter, Director of Australia's Secretariat for the Ocean Drilling Program
- Chuah Joon Huang, Professor of Engineering, President and CEO of Southern University College
- Warrick Couch, astronomer, Director of the Australian Astronomical Observatory and President of the Australian Institute of Physics.
- John Gallas, poet and educator
- Professor Alan Robertson Gemmell Professor of Biology at Keele University (1950–1977)
- Germaine Greer, Australian feminist author; former professor of English Literature and Comparative Studies at the University of Warwick
- Robert Gavin Hampson, Professor of English, Royal Holloway, University of London
- Charles Jago, President of the University of Northern British Columbia
- Karuppannan Jaishankar, Founder / Principal Director & Professor of Criminology, International Institute of Justice and Police Sciences, India
- Abu Hena Mustafa Kamal, poet, songwriter & professor at University of Dhaka
- Will Kymlicka, Canada Research Chair in Political Philosophy, Queen's University at Kingston
- Nissim Mannathukkaren, Associate Professor, Dalhousie University Department of International Development Studies
- Angus McIntosh, Forbes Professor of English Language and General Linguistics, University of Edinburgh
- B. K. Misra, neurosurgeon
- Lynette Mitchell, Professor in Greek History and Politics, University of Exeter
- Bridget Ogilvie, Director of the Wellcome Trust
- Pratapaditya Pal, Curator-Emeritus and formerly, Curator, Los Angeles County Museum of Art
- Peng Tsu Ann, Professor of Mathematics, National University of Singapore
- Kamta Prasad, former professor of economics, Indian Institute of Technology, Kanpur
- Raja Ramanna, chairman, Atomic Energy Commission of India
- B. N. Suresh, Director, Vikram Sarabhai Space Centre
- Ghulam Mohammed Sheikh, Professor of Art, Baroda University
- Lalji Singh, Director, Centre for Cellular and Molecular Biology, Hyderabad
- Sheung-Wai Tam, President Emeritus of The Open University of Hong Kong
- Stephen Toope, President and Vice-Chancellor of the University of British Columbia
- Sunil Kumar Verma, Principal Scientist, Centre for Cellular and Molecular Biology, India
- Jeremy Waldron, Professor of law and philosophy, New York University School of Law
- Alexandra Walsham, Professor of Modern History, University of Cambridge
- Fiona Williams, Professor of Social Policy, University of Leeds
- Benjamin Wood, Senior Lecturer in Creative Writing, King's College London
- Kristin Semmens, Professor of History, University of Victoria
- Hashima Hasan, Program scientist for NASA programs NuSTAR, IXPE, NASA partnership on WMKO

=== Journalists ===
- Edward Greenspon, Editor-in-Chief, The Globe and Mail, Canada
- Charles Krauthammer, Pulitzer Prize–winning journalist
- Chandan Mitra, Editor and managing director of The Pioneer, New Delhi

=== Performing arts ===
- Walter Learning, Founder of Theatre New Brunswick
- Prem Matiyani, Indian theatre director
- Shyamaprasad, Leading Indian (Malayalam) film Director, President, Amrita Television

=== Social entrepreneurs ===
- Kirthi Jayakumar, Gender and Peace activist, Founder of The Red Elephant Foundation

== See also ==
- Association of Commonwealth Universities
