= 2003 Nigerian Senate elections in Bauchi State =

2003 Nigerian Senate election in Bauchi State

The 2003 Nigerian Senate election in Bauchi State was held on April 12, 2003, to elect members of the Nigerian Senate to represent Bauchi State. Baba Tela representing Bauchi North, Bala Adamu representing Bauchi Central and Abubakar Maikafi representing Bauchi South all won on the platform of the Peoples Democratic Party.

== Overview ==
Affiliation	Party		Total
Affiliation	PDP	AD	Total
Before Election			3
After Election	3	0	3

== Summary ==
District	Incumbent	Party	Elected Senator	Party
Bauchi North			Baba Tela	PDP
Bauchi Central			Bala Adamu	PDP
Bauchi South			Abubakar Maikafi	PDP

== Results ==
=== Bauchi North ===
The election was won by Baba Tela of the Peoples Democratic Party.

2003 Nigerian Senate election in Bauchi State
Party	Candidate	Votes	%
PDP	Baba Tela		
Total votes			
PDP hold			

=== Bauchi Central ===
The election was won by Bala Adamu of the Peoples Democratic Party.

2003 Nigerian Senate election in Bauchi State
Party	Candidate	Votes	%
PDP	Bala Adamu		
Total votes			
PDP hold			

=== Bauchi South ===
The election was won by Abubakar Maikafi of the Peoples Democratic Party.

2003 Nigerian Senate election in Bauchi State
Party	Candidate	Votes	%
PDP	Abubakar Maikafi		
Total votes			
PDP hold			
