= Gunapala =

Gunapala is both a given name and a surname. Notable people with the name include:

- Gunapala Amarasinghe (born 1954), Sri Lankan academic
- Gunapala Malalasekera (1899–1973), Sri Lankan academic
- Gunapala Rathnasekara (born 1961), Sri Lankan academic
- Gunapala Tissakuttiarachchi (born 1954), Sri Lankan politician
- Sarath Gunapala, Sri Lankan physicist
