= GUB =

GUB or gub may refer to:

- Gub, a 1991 album by Pigface
- GUB (cuneiform), a sign in cuneiform writing
- Guàrdia Urbana de Barcelona, the local police force of Barcelona.
- Glashütte Original, a German watchmaker
- Green University of Bangladesh
- Global University Bangladesh
- Guerrero Negro Airport, in Baja California, Mexico
- Gub (Glangevlin), a townland in the parish of Glangevlin, County Cavan, Ireland
- Gub (Kinawley), a townland in the parish of Kinawley, County Cavan, Ireland

== See also ==
- Guajajara language (ISO 639 code: gub)
