= Kamta Prasad =

Kamta Prasad may refer to:

- Kamta Prasad (politician)
- Kamta Prasad (economist)

== See also ==
- Kamta Prasad Guru, expert on grammar of the Hindi language
