= Jamila Mohammed Dahiru =

Former commissioner of Ministry of Education

- Citizenship: Nigeria
- Education: Ahmadu Bello University
- Occupation: Lecturer
- Notable work: Former commissioner of Education Bauchi State

Jamila Mohammed Dahiru is a Nigerian educator. She is a former commissioner of the Ministry of Education for Bauchi State. She was appointed by Bala Mohammed.

== Early life and education ==
Jamila Mohammed Dahiru attended Bayero University Kano and Ahmadu Bello University, where she obtained a bachelor's and master's degree in mass communication. She obtained certificates from several educational institutes, and attended courses in leadership and management from London.

== Career ==
Dahiru started her career as a teacher at Nunu International School Kaduna, and as a lecturer in the Department of Mass Communication, Ahmadu Bello University, before being appointed as commissioner in Bauchi State. She is presently a lecturer at the University of Abuja. As commissioner of education she promote girl child education in the state.

== Works out ==
Academic publications

- Tiktok Usage, Social Comparison and Self-esteem among the Youth: Moderating Role of Gender
- Currently works at the Department of Mass Communication, Ahmadu Bello University
