= P. J. Rhodes =

British ancient historian (1940–2021)

P. J. Rhodes FBA
- Born: 10 August 1940
- Died: 27 October 2021 (aged 81); Durham, England
- Title: Professor of Ancient History

Academic background
- Education: Queen Elizabeth's School, Barnet
- Alma mater: Wadham College, Oxford
- Thesis: The Athenian boule (1969)

Academic work
- Discipline: Ancient History
- Sub-discipline: History of Ancient Greece; Ancient Greek politics and political institutions
- Institutions: University of Durham

Peter John Rhodes FBA (10 August 1940 – 27 October 2021), usually cited as P. J. Rhodes, was a British historian of ancient Greece. He was Professor of Ancient History at the University of Durham. He specialized in Ancient Greek politics and political institutions.

== Early life and education ==
Rhodes was born on 10 August 1940 to George Thomas Rhodes and Elsie Leonora Rhodes (née Pugh). He was educated at Queen Elizabeth's School, an all-boys grammar school in Barnet, London. He then studied classics at Wadham College, Oxford, and graduated with a double first Bachelor of Arts (BA) degree and a Doctor of Philosophy (DPhil) degree. His doctoral supervisors were David Malcolm Lewis and G. E. M. de Ste. Croix.

== Academic career ==
In 1965, Rhodes became a lecturer in Classics and Ancient History at the University of Durham, in England. He was promoted to senior lecturer in 1977, and appointed Professor of Ancient History in 1983. He retired in 2005, becoming professor emeritus.

Rhodes held a number of visiting fellowships; Wolfson College, Oxford (1984), University of New England, Australia (1988), Corpus Christi College, Oxford (1993), and All Souls College, Oxford (1998). He served as president of the Classical Association from 2014 to 2015.

His major works include the definitive modern treatment of the Athenian Council (Boule), an important commentary on the Constitution of the Athenians attributed to Aristotle, and a general book on the Athenian empire.

Rhodes was an active member of the Senior Common Room and Chapel of University College, Durham, singing in the Choir for over forty years.

== Personal life ==
In 1971, Rhodes married Jan Teresa Adamson; they divorced in 2001.

== Death ==
He died suddenly on 27 October 2021, in Durham, at the age of 81. A memorial service was held for him at Durham Cathedral on 23 November 2021, and was livestreamed on YouTube. The first P. J. Rhodes memorial lecture was held in his honour in 2022, delivered by Robin Osborne, and a second memorial lecture was held in 2025, delivered by Lynette Mitchell.

== Honours ==
In 1987, Rhodes was elected a Fellow of the British Academy (FBA), the UK's national academy for the humanities and the social sciences. In 2005, he was made a Foreign Member of the Royal Danish Academy. On 18 May 2015, he was awarded the Chancellor's Medal of Durham University in recognition of his "outstanding and continuing contribution to the discipline and the University".

== Selected works ==
- The Athenian Boule, Oxford: Oxford University Press, 1972, rev. 1985.
- Greek Historical Inscriptions, 359-323 B.C., London Association of Classical Teachers, 1972, rev. 1986. ISBN 0-903625-11-3
- A Commentary on the Aristotelian Athenaion Politeia, Oxford: Oxford University Press, 1981, rev. 1993.
- The Athenian Empire, Oxford: Oxford University Press, 1985, rev 1993.
- The Greek City States: A Source Book, 1986, rev. and enlarged edition 2007.
- (with D. M. Lewis) The Decrees of the Greek States, 1997.
- Ancient Democracy and Modern Ideology, London: Duckworth, 2003.
- (with R. Osborne) Greek Historical Inscriptions, 404-323 BC, 2003, corr. 2007.
- A History of the Classical Greek World, 478-323 BC, 2005.
- Alcibiades, Pen and Sword Books, 2011.
- A Short History of Ancient Greece, I.B. Tauris Short Histories, 2014.

Translated and edited ancient authors

- The Athenian Constitution, Penguin Classics, 1984.
- Thucydides: History, Book II, Aris & Phillips, 1988.
- Thucydides: History, Book III, Aris & Phillips, 1994.
- Thucydides: History, Book IV.1-V.24, Aris & Phillips, 1999.
- (with J. L. Marr) The 'Old Oligarch': The Constitution of the Athenians Attributed to Xenophon, Oxford: Aris & Phillips (imprint of Oxbow), 2008.
- (with J. M. Hammond) Thucydides: The Peloponnesian War: translated with an introduction and notes, Oxford: Oxford University Press, 2009.
- Thucydides: History, Book 1, Aris & Philips, 2014.

Edited

- (with L. G. Mitchell) The Development of the Polis in Archaic Greece, 1997.
- D. M. Lewis's Selected Papers in Greek and Near Eastern History, 1997.
- Athenian Democracy, 2004.
- (with E. E. Bridges and E. M. Hall) Cultural Responses to the Persian Wars: Antiquity to the Third Millennium, 2007.
- (with E. M. Harris and D. F. Leao) Law and Drama in Ancient Greece, London: Duckworth, 2010.
- (with P. A. Low and G. J. Oliver). Cultures of Commemoration: War Memorials, Ancient and Modern, Proceedings of the British Academy 160, Oxford University Press, 2012.
