= 2007 Bauchi State gubernatorial election =

State election in Nigeria

- 14 April 2007
Nominee	Isa Yuguda	Mohammed Nadada Umar
Party	ANPP	PDP
Popular vote	550,251	474,233
Governor before election
Ahmadu Adamu Mu'azu
PDP
Elected Governor
Isa Yuguda
ANPP

The 2007 Bauchi State gubernatorial election was the 6th gubernatorial election of Bauchi State. Held on 14 April 2007, the All Nigeria Peoples Party nominee Isa Yuguda won the election, defeating Mohammed Nadada Umar of the People's Democratic Party.

== Results ==
A total of 9 candidates contested in the election. Isa Yuguda from the All Nigeria Peoples Party won the election, defeating Mohammed Nadada Umar from the People's Democratic Party. Registered voters was 2,211,463.

2007 Bauchi State gubernatorial election
Party	Candidate	Votes	%	±%
ANPP	Isa Yuguda	550,251		
PDP	Mohammed Nadada Umar	474,233		
ANPP hold				
