= Anthony Ebehijele Okpere =

Nigerian politician

Anthony Ebehijele Okpere is a retired Nigerian Air Force officer, former managing director of Nigerian Airways and minister of aviation and member of the Federal Executive Council in 1987.

== Early life and education ==
Air Vice Marshal Okpere was born on 28 September 1943, in Uromi, Edo state, Nigeria.

He attended Government Primary School, Uromi before enrolling at Ishan Grammar School, Uromi for his secondary education.

Upon completion of secondary school, he enlisted in the military Command and Staff College, Jaji in 1979. He furthered his military education at the Air War College, Air University, Maxwell Air Force Base, Alabama, USA and Air War College.

== Career and appointments ==
- 1963: Held several key appointments at the Squadron and Wing levels Nigeria Air Force
- 1967–79: Director of operations, Air Force Headquarters, Lagos
- 1979–83: Member, Governing Council, University of Benin, Benin City
- 1979–82: Director, Air Faculty, Command and Staff College, Jaji
- 1983–84: Joined the Nigerian Air Force as cadet officer
- 1984–86: Appointed managing director, Nigeria Air Ways Limited
- 1986–87: Minister of Aviation
- December 1987–February 1989: Air officer commanding, Training Command Nigerian Air Force, Kaduna

== Personal life ==
Okpere married Veronica Isibor in 1968. They have a son and three daughters.
