= Hashima Hasan =

Indian scientist and astrophysicist

- Born: February 8, 1950 (age 76)
- Occupation: Scientist

Hashima Hasan (born February 8, 1950) is an Indian American scientist who has worked in the United States and India. She is the Program Scientist for the Nuclear Spectroscopic Array (NuSTAR), Imaging X-Ray Polarimetry Explorer (IXPE), the NASA/W. M. Keck Observatory partnership and the Education and Public Outreach Lead for Astrophysics. Hasan was also the Lead for Astronomy and Physics Research and Analysis (R&A) programs from 2001 to 2006. In the past, she served as the program scientist for numerous NASA projects, including the James Webb Space Telescope, Hubble Space Telescope, the Wide-field Infrared Survey Explorer (WISE), Gravity and Extreme Magnetism SMEX (GEMS), Stratospheric Observatory for Infrared Astronomy, and the Explorer Program.

== Early life and education ==
Hasan grew up in Lucknow, India. She attended a Roman Catholic all-girls school, Loreto Convent, Lucknow. At this school the girls, including Hasan were limited in the types of scientific knowledge they were allowed to learn, the exception being botany. When she wanted to learn and study these subjects she resorted to using her brother's textbooks. Hasan was initially inspired to become a nuclear physicist after she saw the launch of the USSR's first satellite at a young age. She was further inspired to get into the world of science by her teacher in the 6th grade, and the launch of Sputnik-1. During these times her mother's support encouraged her to continue following her dreams. Other family members also motivated her, like her uncle Husain Zaheer, a former Director-General of the Council of Scientific and Industrial Research (CSIR), and her aunt, Najama Zaheer, a biologist.

Hasan earned a Bachelor of Science degree from Lucknow University. In 1970 she earned her master's degree in physics from Aligarh Muslim University (AMU). She then went on to receive her doctorate from the University of Oxford, U.K., in Theoretical Nuclear Physics in 1976.

== Career ==
Hasan faced many obstacles in order to pursue her scientific research. She jumpstarted her career as soon as she finished her doctoral studies at Oxford. Upon her arrival back to India she took on the role of a post-doctoral scholar at Mumbai's Tata Institute of Fundamental Research (TIFR). She also completed post-doctoral research and held teaching positions in the areas of environmental science and Theoretical Nuclear Physics. In specific she was chosen for a faculty post at the Physics Department, at Poona University in India. Under this position, she taught postgraduate students. Furthermore, she conducted nuclear physics research at the Bhabha Atomic Research Centre (BARC) in Mumbai.

Before joining NASA Headquarters in 1994, she worked as the Optical Telescope Assembly Scientist at the Space Telescope Science Institute in Baltimore. As a Deputy Program Scientist, Hasan oversees and coordinates the Webb Telescope science program by ensuring that its mission is achievable and aligned with NASA's goals. She wrote the simulation software for the optics of the Hubble Space Telescope. While completing work for the Hubble Space Telescope she fixed an optical error that was created by the software. During her time under the R&A programs, she was in charge of establishing guidelines, managing budgets, and redesigning research programs to better meet NASA's objectives. In 2004, she obtained her Senior Executive Service qualification. Hasan has published articles in various peer-reviewed journals, including Icarus, The Astrophysical Journal, and Publications of the Astronomical Society of the Pacific.

=== Awards ===
Hasan was honored with awards and fellowships like the Commonwealth Fellowship from 1973-1976 and the NASA HQ Exceptional Performance Award in 2008. She was a National Research Council Resident Research Associate from 1981-1983. As a student, she received a gold medal for physics and a merit award.

== Personal life ==
Hasan married Aftab Ansari, a scientific officer at the National Institutes of Health, in 1979. They have two sons.
