= Anisuzzaman (philosopher) =

Bangladeshi philosopher

- আনিসুজ্জামান

Vice Chancellor of Global University Bangladesh
- In office June 2019 – Present

Personal details
- Born: 1 March 1951 (age 75) Jessore, East Bengal, Dominion of Pakistan
- Education: University of Dhaka
- Occupation: Professor, university administrator

Anisuzzaman (born 1951) is a Bangladeshi philosopher and university administrator. He is the first vice-chancellor of Global University Bangladesh, and, has been serving since 2019. Most of his career was spent at Dhaka University as a professor of philosophy.

== Biography ==
Anisuzzaman was born on 1 March 1951, in Jessore, East Bengal, Dominion of Pakistan (now Bangladesh) to Shahida Begam and Abul Hossain Molla.

He completed his B.A.(Hons.) and M.A. degrees in philosophy from Dhaka University in 1972 and 1973, respectively. In October 1977, he joined the University of Chittagong as a lecturer in the Department of Philosophy. In 1980 he joined the Department of Philosophy of the University of Dhaka as a lecturer. Next year, in 1981, he completed an MPhil degree from the Dhaka University and in 1982, he became an assistant professor there.

Anisuzzaman received a Commonwealth Scholarship to study Philosophical and Theological Anthropology at the University of Wales in the UK. There he earned a PhD in 1988 for his dissertation, ''The Concept of Man: Dualism and the Western Tradition''.

That year, he became an Associate Professor at the University of Dhaka, and in 1993 he became a Professor. He carried out Postdoctoral Research in Comparative Theology focusing on Adventism at Andrews University in the US in 1994. He acted as Provost of Sir A.F. Rahman Hall of Dhaka University from 1996 to 1997. He also served as Chairman of the Department of Philosophy for two months in 1997. In the same year, he left on a Commonwealth Fellowship for King's College London. There he conducted further research on Comparative Religion. In 1998, he returned to Dhaka University, where he continued to chair the philosophy department until 2000. and directed two centers within the department: the Dev Centre for Philosophical Studies from 2001 to 2005 and the Centre for Moral Development from 2010 to 2013.

Anisuzzaman was appointed the first Vice Chancellor of Bangladesh Islami University, a private university in Dhaka, by Professor Dr. Iajuddin Ahmed, the Honorable President of Bangladesh and Chancellor of the university in 2006. He appointed him as VC for the next four years.

He was appointed the first Vice Chancellor of the Global University Bangladesh, a private university in Barisal, by Mohammad Abdul Hamid, the Honorable President of Bangladesh and Chancellor of the university in 2019. In 2023, he was reappointed for a second four-year term by Mohammed Shahabuddin, the Honorable President of Bangladesh and Chancellor of the university. He resigned on 7 December 2024 due to irrational pressure from a small section of students. However, he withdrew his letter of resignation the next day, 8 December 2024 due to heavy demand from the overwhelming majority of the students and has been working since then.
