= Richard Alexander Arnold =

Canadian author and editor

Richard A. Arnold
- Occupations: Literary Theorist and Author
- Writing career
- Genres: Fiction, and meta-fiction
- Website: Richard Alexander Arnold

Richard Alexander Arnold is the Eminent Professor and Chair of English at Alfaisal University and an author and editor specializing in rhetoric, English literature, Canadian literature, and Medieval literature (focusing on Chaucer, John Milton, William Blake, Samuel Johnson, and Alexander Pope).

Arnold received his B.A. with a double major in English and physics from McMaster University, his M.A. in English Literature from McMaster University, and his Ph.D. in Rhetoric and English Literature from University of Edinburgh, Scotland, where he held the United Kingdom Commonwealth Scholarship. His Ph.D. thesis presented at the University of Edinburgh was "The English hymn in the eighteenth century : an historical and critical study".

Arnold is the author and editor of several books as well as numerous articles on 18th-century literature, 19th-century studies, editorial theory, cultural studies, and Medieval and Canadian literature. He is the recipient of distinguished fellowships, a medal for distinguished teaching, and appointments to review and adjudicate for major publishers worldwide. He has researched and taught in Canada, Great Britain, Middle East and Southeast Asia.

== Books ==
Books written or edited by Richard Arnold include:

- Crystalline Gems of Islamic Jurisprudence (Riyadh: Ministry of Islamic Affairs, 2009)
- Logic of the Fall: Right Reason and [Im]pure Reason in Milton's "Paradise Lost" (New York, 2006)
- English Hymns of the Nineteenth Century (New York, 2005)
- The English Hymn: Studies in a Genre (New York, 1995)
- English Hymns of the Eighteenth Century (New York, 1992)
