= Kema Chikwe =

Nigerian politician

Kemafo Nonyerem Chikwe
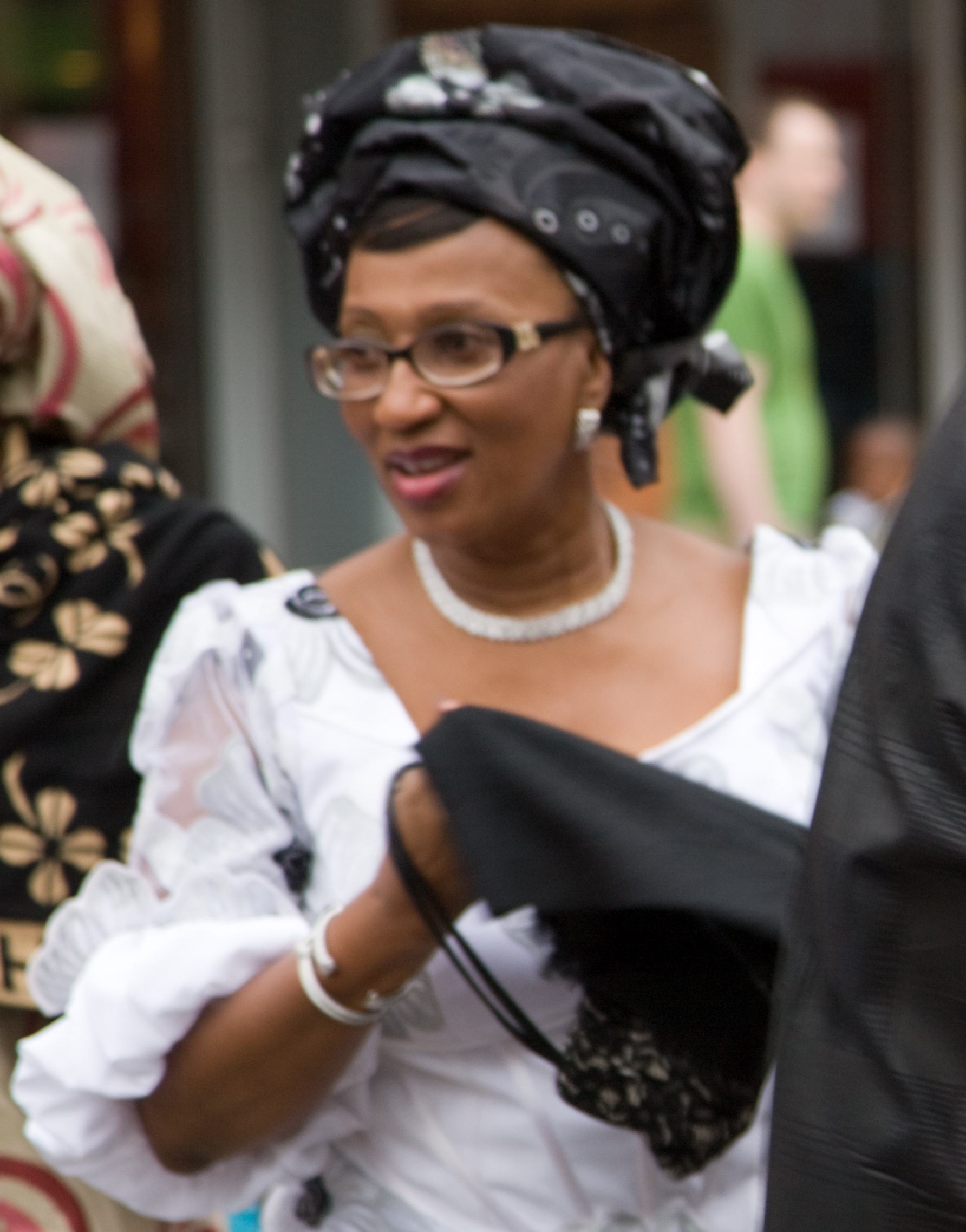
- Kema Chikwe at an Igbo new yam festival, Dublin, Ireland.

Federal Minister of Transport
- In office June 1999 – 2001
- Succeeded by: Ojo Maduekwe

Federal Minister of Aviation
- In office 2001 – May 2003
- Preceded by: Olusegun Agagu
- Succeeded by: Isa Yuguda

Personal details
- Born: Aba, Abia State, Nigeria
- Party: People's Democratic Party

Kemafo Nonyerem "Kema" Chikwe is a former Nigerian Federal Minister of Aviation. She currently holds the position of National Women Leader of the Nigerian political party PDP.

Chikwe started school at the age of five at Aba in what is now Abia State. She majored in French at the Advanced Teachers’ College, Owerri. She then attended Queen's College of the City University of New York where she obtained degrees in French. She obtained a doctorate from the University of Nigeria, Nsukka, in curriculum education. Chikwe became a radio journalist, editor and a publisher. She was chief executive and publisher, Prime Time Limited, publishers of Ash magazine. She has published three books, edited a number of publications and contributed to several books.

She became involved in a number of non-governmental organisations, first entering politics in the second republic. Her sympathies were for the National Party of Nigeria, NPN. She later cast her political lot with the NRC, UNCP and now PDP. She was appointed Minister of Transport, and then of Aviation by President Olusegun Obasanjo, holding office until May 2003. She later went on to run for the Governor of Imo state. In 2009 she became the Nigerian ambassador to Ireland.

She is also the mother of Nigerian rapper Naeto C.
