= Ishbel Campbell =

British chemist

- Born: 13 October 1905
- Died: 10 October 1997 (aged 91)
- Citizenship: British
- Education: University of St. Andrews; Cornell University
- Known for: Researcher and lecturer of chemistry.
- Scientific career
- Workplaces: Swanley Horticultural College; Bedford College, London; University College, Southampton

Isobel 'Ishbel' Grace MacNaughton Campbell (13 October 1905-10 October 1997) was a British chemist researcher and lecturer who held one of the first Commonwealth Fellowships awarded to a woman.

== Biography ==
Campbell was born at The Manse, Kirkcaldy, Fife in 1905 the ninth, and last, child of Reverend John Campbell and Elizabeth Adelina Renwick. In common with her seven elder sisters, she studied at the University of St. Andrews, Scotland. While at St Andrews, Campbell served as the President of the Women's Student's Union. She graduated with a BSc in 1927 and obtained her PhD in 1931.

She spent a year at Cornell University in New York where she held one of the first Commonwealth Fellowships awarded to a woman. Returning to the UK, she became a lecturer in chemistry at Swanley Horticultural College.

Campbell later joined Bedford College as a Demonstrator and Teacher in 1936.

In 1938, Campbell accepted a lectureship at University College, Southampton before later becoming Reader of the University of Southampton.

== Death and legacy ==
Campbell died in Southampton on 10 October 1997, at the age of 91.

Martin Hocking, a former student of Campbell's, said of her:

“Ish” was experimentally well known for her ability to coax more-or-less pure crystals of a new substance from tiny amounts of solution of an unlikely looking, gluey reaction product. It was rumoured that her success was the beneficiary of traces of her cigarette ash that provided nuclei in the crystallization test tube to help initiate the crystallization process aided by temperature changes and by scratching the side of the tube with a glass rod.
