= Federal Ministry of Aviation (Nigeria) =

Ministry in Nigeria

Federal Ministry of Aviation and Aerospace Development

Agency overview
- Type: Executive Department
- Jurisdiction: Federal Government of Nigeria
- Headquarters: Abuja
- Minister responsible: Festus Keyamo, Minister of Aviation
- Agency executive: Mahmud Adam Kambari, Permanent Secretary
- Parent department: Government of Nigeria
- Key document: Constitution of Nigeria
- Website: https://aviation.gov.ng/index.php

The Federal Ministry of Aviation and Aerospace Development is one of the Federal Ministries of Nigeria that regulates air travel and aviation services in Nigeria. The ministry is responsible for the formulation and management of the government's aviation policies in Nigeria. It is directly responsible for overseeing air transportation, airport development and maintenance, the provision of aviation infrastructure and related services. The current Minister of Aviation is Festus Keyamo. He was appointed on 21 August 2023 by President Bola Tinubu.

== History ==
Previously the ministry's Civil Aviation Department investigated aircraft accidents. In 1989 the Federal Civil Aviation Authority (FCAA) opened, and the Civil Aviation Department became the FCAA Department of Safety Services. During the same year the Accident Investigation Bureau (AIB), subordinate to the Ministry of Aviation, was established, and the FCAA no longer had accident investigation responsibilities. The name of the bureau was later changed to the Accident Investigation and Prevention Bureau. As part of the Civil Aviation Act of 2006, the AIB became an autonomous agency, the Accident Investigation Bureau.

== Organisation ==
The ministry has its headquarters in Abuja. Its head office was previously located in Lagos. The ministry is headed by a Minister appointed by the President, assisted by a Permanent Secretary, who is a career civil servant. The Ministry is responsible for parastatals such as the Nigerian College of Aviation Technology.

=== Departments ===
- Air Transport Management Department
- Air Safety Administration Department
- Aerodrome Development Department
- Planning, Research and Statistics Department
- Human Resources Management Department
- General Services Department
- Procurement Department
- Finance & Account Department
- Internal Audit Department
- Legal Services Department
- Reform Coordination and Service Improvement Department
- Special Duties Department
- Press And Public Affairs Unit

== Institution ==
The African Aviation and Aerospace University (AAAU), Abuja, was established in 2022 as a Federal Government of Nigeria initiative under the Federal Ministry of Aviation (Nigeria), now the Federal Ministry of Aviation and Aerospace Development. The university was created to address the shortage of highly skilled manpower and strengthen education, research, innovation, and professional development in Nigeria's aviation and aerospace sectors.

== List ==
- Jaja Wachuku (1965 - 14 January 1966)
- Anthony Ebehijele Okpere (1986–1987)
- Olusegun Agagu (29 May 1999 – 2000)
- Kema Chikwe (2001 – May 2003)
- Isa Yuguda (May 2003 – June 2005)
- Babalola Borishade (July 2005 – November 2006)
- Stella Oduah (July 2, 2011 – February 12, 2014)
- Osita Chidoka (July 2014 – April 2015)
- Hadi Sirika (25 November 2015 – 29 May 2023)
- Festus Keyamo (since 21 August 2023)
