= Isa Yuguda =

Nigerian politician

Isa Yuguda CON

Federal Minister of Aviation
- In office May 2003 – June 2005
- Preceded by: Kema Chikwe
- Succeeded by: Babalola Borishade

Governor of Bauchi State
- In office 29 May 2007 – 29 May 2015
- Preceded by: Adamu Mu'azu
- Succeeded by: Mohammed Abdullahi Abubakar

Personal details
- Born: 15 June 1956 (age 70) Yuguda, Bauchi State, Nigeria
- Party: APC

Mallam Isa Yuguda (born 15 June 1956) is a Nigerian former politician who was the Governor of Bauchi State, Nigeria. He was first elected in April 2007, on the All Nigeria Peoples Party (ANPP) platform. In April 2009, he changed allegiance from the ANPP to the People's Democratic Party (PDP). Yaguda was reelected governor on 28 April 2011.

== Background ==
Isa Yuguda (CON) is an ethnic Fulani, born on 15 June 1956, in Yuguda. He studied at the North East College of Arts & Science in Maiduguri (1974–1976) and then at Ahmadu Bello University, Zaria (1976–1979), graduating with a BSc in Economics. He obtained a master's degree in Business Administration in 1998 at the University of Jos in Plateau State.

Yuguda started work at the Federal Mortgage Bank, Bauchi Area Office as a mortgage manager (1981–1984). He moved to the Savannah Bank working as a credit manager in Sokoto (1986–1987) and then as a manager in Abuja (1987–1991). He moved to Inland Bank as acting general manager (1991–1992) and then managing director and chief executive (1992–1999). He was managing director and chief executive of NAL Merchant Bank (1999 - June 2000).

== Federal minister ==
In June 2000, Yuguda was appointed Minister of State for Transport in the government of President Olusegun Obasanjo. He was moved to the Ministry of Aviation (May 2003 - June 2005). In December 2003, visiting the Murtala Muhammed Airport, Lagos, he expressed concern at the delays in constructing the new terminal and threatened to cancel the contract.

== Bauchi State governor ==
In April 2007, Yuguda contested and won the gubernatorial race of Bauchi State on the platform of All Nigeria People's Party (ANPP). He was sworn in on 29 May 2007. Yaguda was reelected governor on 28 April 2011. He gained 771,503 votes. He was followed by Alhaji Yusuf Tuggar of Congress for Progressive Change (CPC) with 238,426 votes, former Senator Baba Tela of the Action Congress of Nigeria (ACN) with 157,237 votes and Senator Suleiman Nazif of the All Nigeria People's Party (ANPP) with 102,093 votes.

== Personal life ==
He has four wives: Hajiya Aisha Isa Yuguda, Hajiya Hauwa Abiodun Isa Yuguda, Hajiya Mariya Isa Yuguda, and Hajiya Nafisa Isa Yuguda. The fourth and most recent, Nafisat, is the daughter of the former Nigerian president, Late Umaru Yar'Adua. Mariya is the daughter of a Second Republic Senator, Late Ahmadu Danyami. During an interview with BBC Africa radio, he was questioned on the newly signed Nigerian anti-gay bill, he stated that "I am not gay, so my son will never be gay". He went further to explain that he will resign from office, if it ever happened but assured the interviewer that "gay blood does not flow in his family".

== APC ==
In 2016, Yuguda announced his decision to leave the PDP. He switched to the APC in December 2018, Yuguda announced his decision to join the APC at a press conference held at the NUJ Secretariat, through his former Commissioner for Religious Affairs and Community Relations, Salisu Ahmed Barau. Yuguda explained that he joined the APC to continue to contribute to the development of the state. He is at present the Chairman, Board of Trustees of APC Professionals Forum, a key think-tank of professionals in Nigeria's ruling party.

== See also ==
- List of governors of Bauchi State
