= Babayo Garba Gamawa =

Nigerian businessman and politician (1966–2019)

Member of Senate of Nigeria
- In office 29 May 2011 – 2015
- Succeeded by: Suleiman Nazif
- Constituency: Bauchi North

Personal details
- Born: 2 February 1966
- Died: 14 June 2019 (aged 53) Bauchi
- Party: People's Democratic Party (PDP)
- Occupation: Businessman
- Profession: Politician

Babayo Garba Gamawa (2 February 1966 – 14 June 2019) was a Nigerian businessman and was the 2011 Senator for the Bauchi North district of Bauchi State. He was affiliated with the People's Democratic Party (PDP).

== Political career ==
Babayo Garba Gamawa served as both the Deputy Governor and Speaker of the Bauchi State House of Assembly. He became Deputy Governor of Bauchi when Alhaji Mohammed Garba Gadi was impeached from his position. When this impeachment was appealed and the original ruling was deemed unconstitutional, Gadi arrived at the offices to reclaim his seat. Gamawa refused to give up his seat and his supporters rioted in the street, saying "Gamawa is the authentic deputy governor." Gadi's supporters, however, proclaimed that "the owner has arrived, the pretender should roll up his mat." Gamawa would eventually concede and Gadi would reclaim his seat as Deputy Governor.

In 2011, he was elected as the Bauchi North Senator for the 7th National Assembly. He was the vice-president of the Aviation Committee and a member of the Land Transport Committee.

== See also ==
- Senate of Nigeria
