= Kamta Prasad (economist) =

Indian economist, author and professor (born 1936)

- Born: 21 January 1936 (age 90)
- Education: Patna University (BA); Delhi University (MA); University of Leeds (PhD)
- Occupations: Economist; author; professor

Kamta Prasad (born 21 January 1936), is an Indian economist, author, and professor with a career spanning over 60 years. He has published over 20 research books and has contributed to over 150 research papers.

During his career, he has also served as Chairman or Member of more than a dozen National Commissions and Committees in India, such as Chairman, Agricultural, Prices Commission (1976), Chairman, Minimum Wages Advisory Board (1984–90), Member, National Flood Commission (1976–80), Member, Advisory Council, National Bank for Agriculture and Rural Development (2000- 2003) and is currently Member of Supreme Court of India’s Sub Committee on Interlinking of Rivers Projects. In 2001 he cofounded and was Vice President of India Water Partnership. He is also the Chairman Emeritus and Founder of the Institute for Resource Management and Economic Development, an autonomous non-governmental, non-profit organisation responsible for conducting research and promoting education.

== Education ==
Kamta Prasad graduated with a B.A degree from Patna University in 1956 and then received an M.A. degree from Delhi School of Economics, Delhi University in 1958. He also completed his PhD degree in Economics from University of Leeds under the Commonwealth Scholarship and Fellowship Plan in 1966.

== Career ==
Kamta Prasad has taught at leading Indian universities including Patna University - where he started his teaching career as a lecturer in 1958, IIT Kanpur and the Indian Institute for Public Administration (IIPA), New Delhi. He joined IIT Kanpur as an Assistant Professor of Economics in the Department of Humanities and Social Sciences in August 1966, serving as the Head of the Department from 1971 - 1975. He established the institute's PhD program in Economics, and also launched doctoral programs for Psychology and English. Kamta Prasad joined the Indian Institute for Public Administration, New Delhi in 1980 as Professor of Economics and Rural Development and remained there until his superannuation in January 1996. He is currently Chairperson Emeritus at the Institute for Resource Management and Economic Development (IRMED).

Prasad has also delivered keynotes at national and international conferences and lectures at leading international universities. He has served as an expert for Union Public Service Commission and University Grants Commission (India). He continues to deliver special lectures at leading universities today.

=== Accolades, honours and fellowships ===
- Patna University Merit Scholarship (1953-1956)
- Post Graduate Scholarship, Delhi University (1956-1958)
- Junior Research Fellowship of the University Grants Commission (India) (1962-1963)
- Commonwealth Scholarship and Fellowship Plan (1963-1966)
- British Council Fellowship, U.K. (1981 and 1990)
- Indo-French Programme Fellowship (1982, 1983, 1984)
- President, Indian Economic Association (1983)
- Advisor, International Economic Association (1983–86)
- Fellow, Institute of Development Studies (1990)
- Fellow, Shastri Indo-Canadian Institute at Memorial University of Newfoundland (1991)
- T.N Chaturvedi Award for the Best Article in the Indian Journal of Public Administration (2014)
- Paul H. Appleby Award For Distinguished Services (2019)
- Dr. Rajendra Prasad Award for Academic Excellence (2023)

== Research and publications ==
Kamta Prasad's research spans the areas of monetary economics, economic planning, rural development, employment, resource management, water resource management and impact assessment of computers on India's development. He has made several contributions to knowledge and research, publishing 20 research books and over 150 research papers and articles. His work includes 60 policy-oriented research projects sponsored by the Government of India and development institutes like Asian Development Bank, UNESCO, International Fund for Agricultural Development etc. He has also served on the editorial advisory boards of several journals, including the International Journal of Social Science and Development Policy.

=== Books ===
- Prasad, K. (1969). Role Of Money Supply In A Developing Economy: A Theoretical And Empirical Analysis
- Prasad, K., & Verma, P. (1977). Impact of computers on employment.
- Prasad, K. & Ramamohan, R. T. V. S. (1977). Employment Potential Of Manufacturing Industries: A Case Study of Uttar Pradesh.
- Prasad, K. (1985). Planning and its Implementation.
- Prasad, K. (1985). Planning for Poverty Alleviation.
- Prasad, K. (1985). Planning in a Market Economy
- Prasad, K. (1988). Planning at the Grassroots
- Prasad, K. (1991). Action for development
- Prasad, K., & Singh, B.D. (1994). Drought, Disaster And Development: Profile, Performance & Potential.
- Prasad, K. & Goel, R.S. (2000). Environmental Management in Hydro Electric Projects: Proceedings of the National Seminar Held at India International Centre, New Delhi
- Prasad, K., Indian Economic Association., & Indian Economic Association. (2001). V.K.R.V. Rao and B.R. Shenoy: Economic ideas in contrast.
- Prasad, K. (2001). Farmer Participation In Irrigation Management In India: Status, Impact, And Determinants
- Prasad, K., Madaan, D. K., & Indian Economic Association. (2001). NGOs and socio-economic development opportunities.
- Prasad, K. (2003). Water Resources And Sustainable Development: Challenges on 21st Century.
- Prasad, K. (2005). Manual on Community Approach to Flood Management in India
- Prasad, K. (2015). Water In The Coming Decades: Policy And Governance Issues In India

=== Articles ===
- Prasad, K. (1980). Government and the Economic System. Indian Journal of Public Administration, 26, 3, 866-871.
- Prasad, K. (1984). French and Indian Planning Systems: A Comparative Study. Indian Journal of Public Administration, 30, 3, 688-705.
- Prasad, K. (1985). Planning in a market economy: A study of the French planning system. New Delhi: Indian Institute of Public Administration
- Prasad, K. (1985). Towards a More Integrated Structure of Rural Development Administration. Indian Journal of Public Administration, 31, 3, 683-692.
- Prasad, K., & Sinha, P. K. (1987). Allocative Efficiency, Policy Shifts And Trade Flows In The Context Of Indo-US. Trade
- Prasad, K., & Ramesh, S. (1987). Energy Development Choices For India. The Economics Of Choice Between Energy Sources: Proceedings Of A Conference Held By The International Economic Association In Tokyo, Japan.
- Prasad, K. (1988). Public Administration Research and the Problem of Inequality. Indian Journal of Public Administration, 34, 1, 1-17.
- Prasad, K. (1988). Socio - Economic Requirements Of Appropriate Technologies For Eradication Of Rural Poverty.
- Prasad, K. (1988). Public Administration Research And The Problem Of Inequality.
- Prasad, K. (1989). Demographic Policy and the Balance Between Agriculture and Industry: Introduction. The Balance Between Industry and Agriculture In Economic Development: Proceedings Of The Eighth World Congress Of The International Economic Association, - Vol. 3: Manpower And Transfers.
- Prasad, K. (1991). Rural Development Strategies: The South Asian Experiences
- Prasad, K. (1991). Flood Control: Achievements and Challenges
- Prasad, K. (1993). Sustainable Development of Drought-Prone Areas. Policy Issues and Options. Indian Journal of Public Administration, 454-464.
- Prasad, K. (1994). Future Role of Planning Under New Perspectives. Indian Journal of Public Administration, 40, 3, 525-536.
- Prasad, K. (2003). Water and Poverty Alleviation. The Indian Journal of Public Administration. 49, 3, 374.
- Prasad, K. (2013). Ground Water Governance in India: Gaps and the Way Out. Indian Journal of Public Administration, 59, 2, 228-246.
