= Malam Wakili =

Nigerian politician

Ali Wakili, mni.

Senator of the Federal Republic of Nigeria representing Bauchi South
- In office 6 June 2015 – 17 March 2018 Serving with Suleiman Nazif; Isah Misau
- Preceded by: Adamu Gumba
- Succeeded by: Lawal Yahaya Gumau

Personal details
- Born: Ali Wakili; 12 February 1960 Bauchi, Nigeria
- Died: 17 March 2018 (aged 58)
- Party: All Progressive Congress
- Relations: Samir Ali (son) Amir Ali Wakili (son) Hauwa Ali Wakili (daughter) Asiya Samir Ali (grand daughter) Ali Samir Wakili (grand son)
- Education: GSS Damaturu. Bauchi college of art and science. Bayero University Kano, NIPSS Kuru Jos.
- Profession: Retired Customs Officer Businessman politician

Ali Wakili (Born on 12 February 1960 – 17 March 2018 in Lere, Tafawa Balewa Local Government Area of Bauchi state) was a senator of the Federal Republic of Nigeria from Bauchi State and retired controller of customs. Customs area controller of Tincan Island port, Seme border, and commandant of customs training school kano. He represented south Bauchi in the current 8th National Assembly before his death on March 17, 2018. Senator Wakili was the chairman, Poverty Alleviation & Social Welfare Committee and Vice Chairman of the Air Force Committee of the 8th National Assembly.

Ali Wakili joined the Bauchi State Civil Service as an Administrative Officer in August 1983 as Administrative Officer Class VI. By dint of hardwork he had a rapid rise to an Administrutive Officer Il in 1991. He transferred his services to the Nigeria Customs as an Assistant Comptroller in 1991 and became a substantive Comptroller in 1996.

Ali Wakill attended many courses and seminars within and outside Nigeria. These include the SSS Training School, Ojo Lagos; ASCON Badagry; ECOWAS Community Computer Contre (CCC) Lome, Togo; International Investment and Taxation Centre, London; and the Infantry Center and School, Jaji.

He holds the traditional titles of "Sarin Yakin Leren-Bauchi" and "Fagachin Bauchi."

A by-election was conducted after his death and Lawal Yahaya Gumau of the All Progressive Congress won.

The south Bauchi Senatorial District covers seven local government areas.
