= Sule Katagum =

Nigerian civil servant (1927–2017)

Sule Katagum OFR CMG CFR

Chairman of the Federal Public Service Commission
- In office 1959–1975
- Preceded by: position established
- Succeeded by: Okoronkwo Kesandu Ogan

Personal details
- Born: 1927 Katagum, Bauchi Province, Colonial Nigeria
- Died: 17 December 2017 (aged 89–90)
- Party: National Party of Nigeria (1979–1983)
- Other political affiliations: Northern People's Congress (–1966)
- Children: Audu Sule Katagum
- Education: Bauchi Middle School

Alhaji Sule Katagum OFR CMG (1927 – 17 December 2017) was a Nigerian civil servant, statesman and businessman. He was the first Chairman of Nigeria's Federal Public Service Commission. He also held the traditional title of madakin katagum and later became the Waziri of the Katagum Emirate in 1989.

== Life ==
Sule Katagum was born in Katagum in the Bauchi Province of Colonial Northern Nigeria.

In the early 1940s, he attended Bauchi Middle School, where he was taught by Aminu Kano and Abubakar Tafawa Balewa. During his time there, he led a student protest against the alleged mistreatment of students, citing issues such as withheld pocket money and poor food quality. The protest escalated to involve the entire student body and drew the attention of the Emir of Bauchi. Following an investigation, the headmaster was dismissed and replaced by Balewa.

Upon completing his studies, Katagum was admitted to the Institute of Administration, Zaria. While at Zaria, he formed a close friendship with Isa Wali, a cousin of Aminu Kano, who became his roommate.

In the 1950s, Katagum began his career in public service as a civil servant under the Katagum Native Authority. By 1955, he had joined the Northern People's Congress (NPC) and was appointed Secretary of the party's Katagum branch. In 1959, Abubakar Tafawa Balewa, at the time Prime Minister of Nigeria, appointed Katagum Chairman of the Federal Public Service Commission (FPSC).

Following the January 1966 coup that brought the Nigerian First Republic to an end, Katagum retained his position as Chairman of the FPSC under General Johnson Aguiyi-Ironsi. After the counter-coup later that year and the assassination of Aguiyi-Ironsi, Katagum led a delegation of civil servants to persuade Lt. Colonel Murtala Muhammed and other senior Northern officers against seceding from the Nigerian Federation. He was also one of the main proponents of the creation of more states and played an important role in convincing Northern leaders to accept Yakubu Gowon's decree to replace the four regions with twelve states in early 1967.

Katagum retired from the civil service after he was replaced as Chairman of the FPSC with Professor Okoronkwo Kesandu Ogan by Murtala Muhammad, at the time Nigeria's Head of State.

During the Nigerian Second Republic (1979–1983), Katagum became a leading member of the National Party of Nigeria. After the military overthrow of the civilian government in 1983, he became a vocal critic of the regime led by General Muhammadu Buhari. Following an interview he gave to the New Nigerian in which he made statements critical of the military government the military government, he was arrested alongside Bukar Zarma, the paper's editor. They were both released in August 1985 following the military coup led by General Ibrahim Babangida.

Katagum held the traditional title of Waziri of Katagum Emirate.

Katagum died on 17 December 2017.
