= Lynette Mitchell =

- Born: 1966

Academic background
- Education: University of New England (Australia); Durham University

Academic work
- Discipline: Classics
- Sub-discipline: Greek History
- Institutions: University of Exeter
- Notable works: Greeks Bearing Gifts; Panhellenism and the Barbarian in Archaic and Classical Greece; The Heroic Rulers of Archaic and Classical Greece

Lynette Gail Mitchell (born 1966) is Professor Emerita in Greek History and Politics at the University of Exeter. Mitchell is known for her work on ancient Greek politics and kingship.

== Career ==
Mitchell obtained her BA at the University of New England (Australia) and then moved to the UK on a Commonwealth Scholarship in 1991. Mitchell completed her PhD at the University of Durham in 1994. She published her thesis as Greeks Bearing Gifts: the public use of private relationships 435-323 BC (Cambridge University Press) in 1997. Mitchell held a British Academy Post-doctoral Fellowship and Junior Research Fellowship at Oriel College, Oxford.

In 1998 Mitchell was appointed as lecturer in Classics and Ancient History at the University of Exeter becoming associate professor and then professor in 2013. She became the Director of the Centre for Mediterranean Studies in May 2007. Mitchell works primarily on ancient Greek politics and the relationship between Greek states, and between Greeks and non-Greeks, and on aspects of kingship.

Mitchell has been invited to lecture on her work widely, including the 2009 Dorothy Buchan Memorial Lecture at the University of Leicester on Queens and consorts: securing the succession in archaic and classical Greece?, the 2016 Douglas MacDowell Memorial Lecture of the Classical Association of Scotland on Kingship, law and democracy, a lecture on Monarchs in Democracy in 2017 for the Institute of Intellectual History at the University of St Andrews, and a keynote lecture in 2018 at the 18th International Conference for Ancient East-Mediterranean Studies in Tartu (ICAEM 2018) on The politics of power: the rise and fall of the Deinomenid dynasty in fifth-century Sicily.

Mitchell encourages wider participation in classical studies through various projects including the creation of Isca Latina, a project for state school students to learn Latin, and involvement in the Classical Association South-West Branch's annual Sixth-form Classics Conference.

== Select publications ==
- with C. Melville (eds) Every Inch a King. Comparative Studies on Kings and Kingship in the Ancient and Medieval Worlds (Leiden, Brill 2013)
- The Heroic Rulers of Archaic and Classical Greece (London 2013)
- with L. Rubinstein (eds) Greek History and Epigraphy. Essays in Honour of PJ Rhodes (Swansea, Classical Press of Wales 2009)
- Panhellenism and the Barbarian in Archaic and Classical Greece (Classical Press of Wales 2007)
- 'Tyrannical oligarchs at Athens' In Lewis S. (Ed.), Ancient Tyranny (pp. 178–187). (Edinburgh University Press 2006)
- Greeks Bearing Gifts: the public use of private relationships 435-323 BC (Cambridge University Press 1997)
- with P.J. Rhodes, The Development of the Polis in Archaic Greece (Routledge 1997)
