= Karuppannan Jaishankar =

Indian criminologist

K. Jaishankar
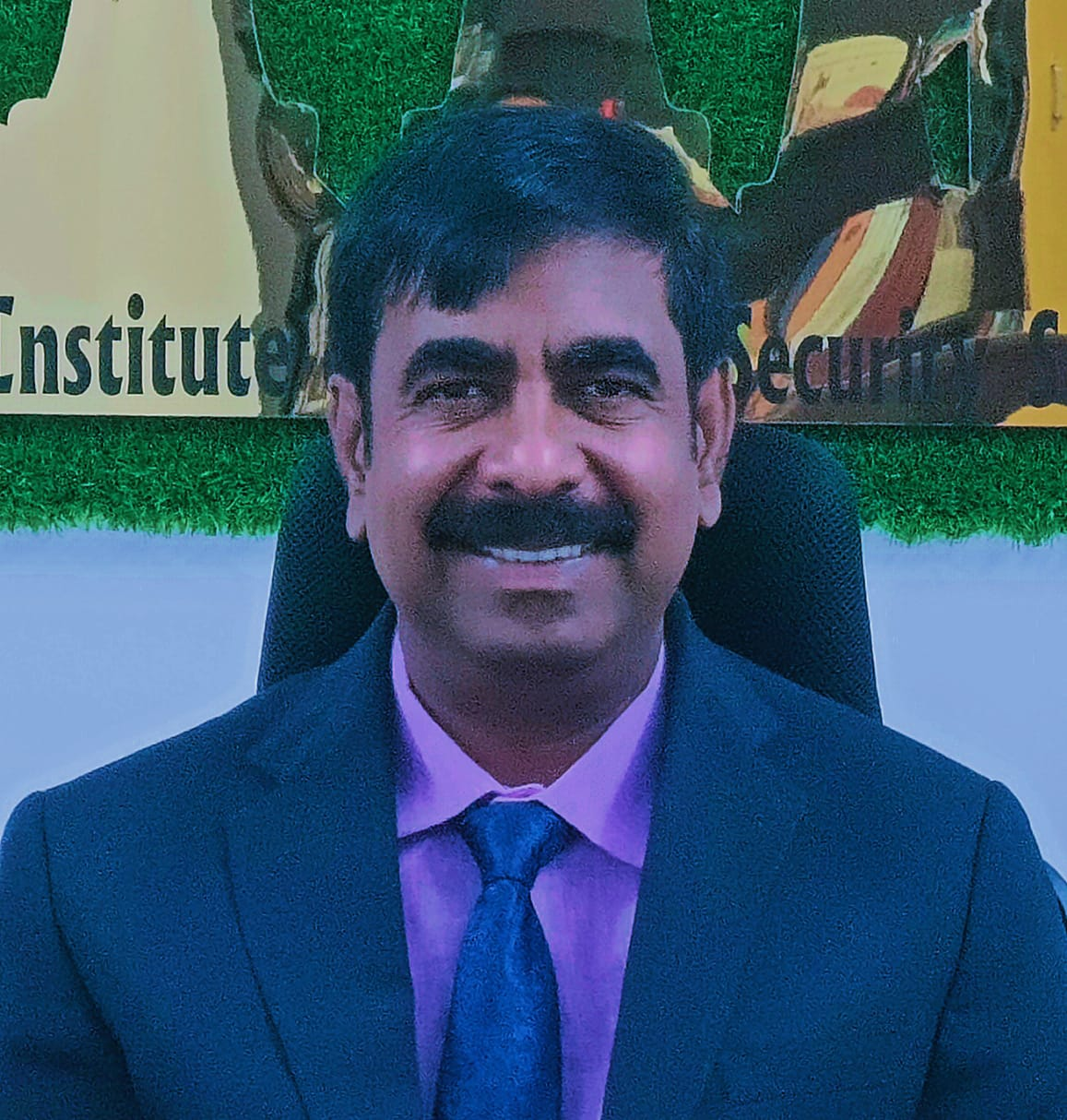
- Other name: Jaishankar Karuppannan
- Education: MA PhD (Criminology); PG Diploma in GIS Management
- Alma mater: University of Madras and PSG College of Arts and Science (Bharathiar University)
- Occupations: teaching, research, consultancy
- Known for: cyber criminology, space transition theory
- Awards: National Academy of Sciences, India -SCOPUS Young Scientist Award -2012
- Scientific career
- Fields: criminology, crime science, cyber criminology, victimology and police sciences
- Workplaces: Manonmaniam Sundaranar University, Rashtriya Raksha University, University of Leeds, International Institute of Justice & Police Sciences, University of Malaya
- Website: www.jaishankar.org

Karuppannan Jaishankar (also known as K. Jaishankar; born 15 June 1973) is an Indian criminologist. He is the founder, principal director and professor of criminology and justice sciences at the International Institute of Justice & Police Sciences (IIJPS), a non-profit academic institution and policy think tank in Bengaluru, Karnataka, India.

He is the Principal Research Fellow at the Faculty of Law, University of Malaya, Malaysia. He is also an adjunct faculty member of the United Nations Interregional Crime and Justice Research Institute, Italy and the University for Peace, where he teaches modules of the Master of Laws (LL.M.) in Cybercrime, Cybersecurity and International Law, and a Distinguished Adjunct Professor of Criminology at Saveetha School of Law, Saveetha University, Chennai.

He has been described as the “founding father” of cyber criminology, a sub-discipline of criminology, and the proponent of the Space Transition Theory of Cyber Crimes, which examines how behaviour may differ between cyberspace and physical space.

== Early life and education ==
Jaishankar was born in Krishnagiri, Tamil Nadu, India. He completed a BSc in biochemistry at PSG College of Arts and Science, Bharathiar University, Coimbatore, in 1994. He earned an MA in criminology from the University of Madras in 1996, a postgraduate diploma in geographic information systems management from the same university in 2000, and a PhD in criminology in 2003. His doctoral thesis, Crimes of Communal Violence and Victimization in Coimbatore City: A Geographic Information Systems (GIS) Analysis, was supervised by K. Chockalingam.

== Career ==
Before establishing IIJPS in 2022, Jaishankar worked at Manonmaniam Sundaranar University, Tirunelveli (2002–2016), as Lecturer and Senior Assistant Professor of Criminology, and at Raksha Shakti University (now Rashtriya Raksha University), Ahmedabad (2016–2020), as Professor of Criminology, and Head of the Department of Criminology. He was a Commonwealth Academic Fellow at the Centre for Criminal Justice Studies, School of Law, University of Leeds, in 2009–2010.

== Scholarship and disciplinary development ==
=== Cyber criminology ===
Jaishankar is credited with founding cyber criminology as an academic field of study within criminology. In 2007 he introduced the term and launched the International Journal of Cyber Criminology, an open-access journal that he edited until 2022. By h-index, the journal ranked second among sources of cybercrime research published between 2000 and 2023, according to a 2025 bibliometric analysis.

He defined cyber criminology as "the study of causation of crimes that occur in the cyberspace and its impact in the physical space", and argued that crime in cyberspace required its own theoretical and empirical attention rather than the direct application of theories developed for physical space. The criminologist Gorazd Meško described him as the "founding father" of cyber criminology. He edited the volume Cyber Criminology: Exploring Internet Crimes and Criminal Behavior (CRC Press, 2011).

Cyber criminology has since been offered as a named field of study at universities in the United States. These include undergraduate majors at Florida State University and Saint Anselm College, bachelor's degrees at Kent State University and Indiana State University, and minors at the University of Alabama and Old Dominion University.

Murat Erdoğan and Ömer Faruk Akmeşe of Hitit University, in a study of Web of Science records on cybercrime research from 2000 to 2023, identified Jaishankar as the author with the most publications (21) indexed under the search terms “cyber crimes,” “internet crimes” and “computer crimes”.

His forthcoming book Cyber Criminology and Victimology: Theory, Case Studies, and New Frontiers, scheduled for publication by Springer Nature in 2027, examines cybercrime and cyber victimization through theoretical frameworks, case studies, and contemporary issues in digital environments. The book also addresses Space Transition Theory and its relevance to understanding criminal behaviour and victimization across online and physical environments.

=== Space Transition Theory ===
In 2007 Jaishankar proposed the space transition theory of cyber crimes, which seeks to explain why people behave differently in cyberspace than in physical space. He first presented the theory at John Jay College of Criminal Justice in 2007 and published it in full in 2008. The theory proposes that people with repressed criminal behaviour in physical space are more likely to offend in cyberspace, and it identifies factors such as identity flexibility, dissociative anonymity, the lack of deterrence, the movement of individuals between physical space and cyberspace, and differences between the norms and values of the two spaces.

Stalans and Finn (2016) identified space transition theory as one of the theoretical approaches developed specifically to explain cybercrime. A 2026 systematic review by Lazarus and Abubakari identified 19 empirical studies that applied the theory between 2007 and 2025. It found support for several of its propositions but uneven explanatory reach, and noted gaps relating to cultural meaning-making, structural inequality and platform architecture. The theory has also been used as the main framework of empirical studies, including a 2026 qualitative study of romance fraud in India.

The theory is included in university teaching and examination syllabi. It is covered in the cyber criminology course CNIT 42200 at Purdue University, in a doctoral course on cyber criminology at the National Open University of Nigeria, and in the criminology syllabi of India's National Eligibility Test conducted for the University Grants Commission and of the Tamil Nadu Public Service Commission. In 2026 Jaishankar wrote the entry on the theory for The Palgrave Encyclopedia of Cyberpsychology.

=== Cyber victimology ===
Jaishankar's early work on cyber victimization included research on victims of cybercrime during a Commonwealth Academic Fellowship at the University of Leeds during 2009–2010. In 2009, he founded the Centre for Cyber Victim Counselling (CCVC), where he served as executive director, until 2025. An Internet Society report identified CCVC among organisations in India providing recovery and care for victims of online child abuse and exploitation, while a report by the Broadband Commission for Digital Development described its cyber-awareness programmes for schools, parents, community members and police.

Building on his research and practical work, Jaishankar proposed cyber victimology as a distinct subdiscipline of victimology in his keynote address, "Cybercrime Victimization: New Wine into Old Wineskins", at the 15th International Symposium of the World Society of Victimology in Perth, Australia, in July 2015. He developed the concept in his 2020 chapter, "Cyber Victimology: A New Sub-Discipline of the Twenty-First Century Victimology", published in a Springer volume honouring victimologist Marc Groenhuijsen.

=== South Asian criminology ===
In 2009, Jaishankar founded the South Asian Society of Criminology and Victimology (SASCV), an international association intended to promote criminology and victimology in Afghanistan, Bangladesh, Bhutan, India, Pakistan, the Maldives, Nepal and Sri Lanka and serves as its President. Sesha Kethineni and Ying Cao, in a 2017 review of criminology and criminal justice education in India, described SASCV as one of "four notable criminology and criminal justice professional associations in India". They noted its affiliation with the International Journal of Criminal Justice Sciences and its annual conferences, and they outlined its mission of promoting criminological and victimological research in South Asia, providing educational programmes, creating centres and departments of victimology, and serving as a consultant to entities in the region.

As president and general chair, Jaishankar organized the society's five international conferences, held in Jaipur (2011), Kanyakumari (2013), Goa (2016), Ahmedabad (2020) and Bengaluru (2023). Peer-reviewed papers from the first two conferences formed the basis of two volumes he edited for CRC Press: Global Criminology: Crime and Victimization in a Globalized Era (2013, with Natti Ronel) and Interpersonal Criminology: Revisiting Interpersonal Crimes and Victimization (2016). The International Journal of Criminal Justice Sciences, which he founded and edited, served as the society's official journal until 2022.

Under his leadership, SASCV entered into a reciprocal affiliation agreement with the Academy of Criminal Justice Sciences in 2018. In 2024, it became the first South Asian member of the CrimRxiv consortium of criminology institutions. That year, SASCV also collaborated with the University of Sri Jayewardenepura on an international conference on criminology and criminal justice in Sri Lanka.

He edited the Routledge Handbook of South Asian Criminology (2020), which covers crime, criminal justice and victimization in Afghanistan, Bangladesh, Bhutan, India, Maldives, Nepal, Pakistan and Sri Lanka.

== Editorial roles ==
Jaishankar is the founder and editor-in-chief of the International Journal of Justice and Police Sciences, the official journal of the International Institute of Justice & Police Sciences, which began publication in 2025. He founded the International Journal of Criminal Justice Sciences in 2006 and served as its editor-in-chief until 2022.

He is a member of the editorial board of Trends in Organized Crime, published by Springer, and of the cybercrime editorial board (Associate Editor) of the International Journal of Police Science & Management, published by SAGE. He is also an international editor of the Journal of Digital Technologies and Law. He is a member of the editorial advisory board of Temida, and he served on the international editorial board of the International Journal for Crime, Justice and Social Democracy from 2016 to 2023.

== Policy and professional engagement ==
In 2006, Shaheen Shariff of McGill University, Jaishankar, and others received a Social Sciences and Humanities Research Council of Canada International Opportunities Fund grant for a project on cyberbullying and international policy guidelines for schools.

In 2007–2008, he was a member of the United Nations Office on Drugs and Crime core group of experts on identity-related crime. In 2019, he took part as an invited expert in United Nations Office of Counter-Terrorism meetings on assistance and support for victims of terrorism in the Asia-Pacific region.

Jaishankar at the Opening Discussion of Stockholm Criminology Symposium, 2012.

In 2012, Jaishankar was an invited discussant at the Stockholm Criminology Symposium in Stockholm, Sweden, where he participated in the opening discussion on victims of crime, crime patterns, and improving criminal justice practice and policy and responded to the questions of Beatrice Ask, the Swedish minister for justice, and Paula Teixeira da Cruz, the Portuguese minister for justice.

He gave keynote addresses at the 14th (The Hague, 2012) and 15th (Perth, 2015) symposia of the World Society of Victimology. He was an International Ambassador of the British Society of Criminology from 2015 to 2025.

K. Jaishankar presented the Trained Criminologists' reports to the Commissioner of Police, Ahmedabad in 2017.

In 2017, he directed the “Trained Criminologists Project”, a partnership between Raksha Shakti University and Ahmedabad City Police in which criminologists worked with the police to analyse crime patterns, including offences against Scheduled Castes and Scheduled Tribes.

Jaishankar is a fellow of the African Centre for Cyber Law and Cyber Crime Prevention (ACCP).

== Media commentary ==
Jaishankar has been interviewed as a criminologist by national and international media, including NPR, The Times of India, Süddeutsche Zeitung, Mint and Arirang TV, on topics such as cybercrime, sexual violence and deepfakes.

== Awards ==
Jaishankar received the NASI-Scopus Young Scientist Award in 2012.

Jaishankar received the National Academy of Sciences, India (NASI)–SCOPUS Young Scientist Award in Social Sciences in 2012, the first award in that category. He also received the Prof. S. S. Srivastava Award for Excellence in Teaching and Research in Criminology from the Indian Society of Criminology in 2015.

== Selected publications ==
=== Books ===
- Jaishankar, K., ed. (2011). Cyber Criminology: Exploring Internet Crimes and Criminal Behavior. Boca Raton, Florida: CRC Press. ISBN 9781439829493.
- Jaishankar, K.; Ronel, N., eds. (2013). Global Criminology: Crime and Victimization in a Globalized Era. Boca Raton, Florida: CRC Press. ISBN 9781439892497.
- Halder, D.; Jaishankar, K. (2016). Cyber Crimes Against Women in India. New Delhi: SAGE Publications. ISBN 9789385985775.
- Jaishankar, K., ed. (2016). Interpersonal Criminology: Revisiting Interpersonal Crimes and Victimization. Boca Raton, Florida: CRC Press. ISBN 9781498748599.
- Jaishankar, K., ed. (2020). Routledge Handbook of South Asian Criminology. Abingdon, Oxon: Routledge. ISBN 9780367531027.
- Jaishankar, K. (forthcoming, 2027). Cyber Criminology and Victimology: Theory, Case Studies, and New Frontiers. Cham: Springer Nature. ISBN 9783032445438.

=== Journal articles ===
- Jaishankar, K. (2007). "Establishing a theory of cyber crimes". International Journal of Cyber Criminology. 1 (2): 7–9. doi:10.5281/zenodo.18792.
- Halder, D.; Jaishankar, K. (2013). "Revenge porn by teens in the United States and India: A socio-legal analysis". International Annals of Criminology. 51 (1–2): 85–111. doi:10.1017/S0003445200000076.
- Halder, D.; Jaishankar, K. (2014). "Online victimization of Andaman Jarawa tribal women: An analysis of the 'Human Safari' YouTube videos (2012) and its effects". British Journal of Criminology. 54 (4): 673–688. doi:10.1093/bjc/azu026.
- Manikandan, S.; Jaishankar, K.; Bushell, M.; Telford, L.; Treadwell, J. (2024). "The victimisation of Rohingyas in Myanmar and Bangladesh: Breaking the silence – Postcolonial criminology, ethnography and genocide". British Journal of Criminology. 64 (4): 881–895. doi:10.1093/bjc/azad069.
- Jaishankar, K. (2026). "Digital opportunity structures and cryptocurrency fraud: A theoretical framework". Journal of Contemporary Criminal Justice. 42 (4): 618–645. doi:10.1177/10439862261485728.

=== Invited encyclopedia and reference entries ===
- Jaishankar, K. (2026). "Cyber victimization". In Huebner, B. (ed.). Oxford Bibliographies in Criminology. Oxford University Press. doi:10.1093/9780197858301.003.0337.
- Jaishankar, K. (2026). "Space Transition Theory". In Fullwood, C.; Branley-Bell, D.; Orchard, L.; Limniou, M.; Stefanova, V. (eds.). The Palgrave Encyclopedia of Cyberpsychology. Cham: Palgrave Macmillan. doi:10.1007/978-3-031-52643-5_179-1.

=== Book chapters ===
- Jaishankar, K. (2008). "Space Transition Theory of Cyber Crimes". In Schmalleger, F.; Pittaro, M. (eds.). Crimes of the Internet. Upper Saddle River, New Jersey: Prentice Hall. pp. 283–301.
- Jaishankar, K. (2013). "Cyber victimization: New typology and novel trends of interpersonal attacks on the Internet". In Information Society and Cybercrime: Challenges for Criminology and Criminal Justice. Seoul: Korean Institute of Criminology. pp. 31–47.
- Jaishankar, K. (2020). "Cyber victimology: A new sub-discipline of the 21st century victimology". In Joseph, J.; Jergenson, S. (eds.). An International Perspective on Contemporary Developments in Victimology: A Festschrift in Honor of Marc Groenhuijsen. Cham: Springer. pp. 3–19.
- Halder, D.; Jaishankar, K. (2021). "Cyber governance and data protection in India: A critical legal analysis". In Romaniuk, S. N.; Manjikian, M. (eds.). The Routledge Companion to Global Cyber-Security Strategy. Abingdon, Oxon: Routledge. pp. 337–348.
- Jaishankar, K. (forthcoming, 2026). "Caste conflict and justice in India: A theoretical framework on criminalization, victimization, and social wellness". In Phillips, J.; Novisky, M.; Ricciardelli, R. (eds.). Routledge International Handbook of Wellbeing and Wellness in Criminal Justice. Abingdon, Oxon: Routledge.
