= Nuhu Gidado =

Nigerian politician

Nuhu Gidado (born 5 October 1958) in a Nigerian politician.

Gidado was chosen by the All Progressives Congress gubernatorial candidate to serve as deputy gubernatorial candidate for the 2015 general elections in Bauchi State, Nigeria. He then served as Deputy Governor of Bauchi State from 29 May 2015 until his resignation on 24 May 2018.

== Family ==
He was born to the family of late Wazirin Jama'are Alhaji Gidado Mua'zu.
