= Gunapala Amarasinghe =

Sri Lankan academic

- Born: August 31, 1954 (age 71); Alawwa Kurunegala, Sri Lanka
- Education: Ibbagamuwa Central College, University of Colombo, Benaras Hindu University

Amarasinghe Pathiranalage Gunapala Amarasinghe (Sinhala: අමරසිංහ පතිරණලාගේ ගුණපාල අමරසිංහ; born August 31, 1954) is a Sri Lankan academic. He is a research scientist and a senior lecturer in Ayurvedic paediatrics. He is currently a professor and the head of the Department of Prasutitantra and Kaumarabrithya (Ayurvedic Obstetrics and Pediatrics) of Institute of Indigenous Medicine, University of Colombo.

== Early life and career ==
Amarasinghe was born and raised in Alawwa, a rural area in Kurunegala District. He obtained the Diploma in Ayurvedic Medicine and Surgery from the College of Indigenous Medicine in 1976. He then attended to Benaras Hindu University for the degree of Doctor of Medicine which he obtained in 1987. He obtained his degree of Doctor of Philosophy from the Benaras Hindu University in 1997.

After obtaining his doctorate, he was selected by the Commonwealth Scholarship and Fellowship Plan for a post-doctoral research fellowship at the University of Exeter, United Kingdom. His research includes systematic review of Ayurvedic and traditional medical compounds, and qualitative studies of traditional medical preparations. He is also the current editor-in-chief of the Sri Lankan Journal of Indigenous Medicine (SLJIM).

== See also ==
- University of Colombo
- Institute of Indigenous Medicine

== Bibliography ==
- Amarasinghe, A.P.G., Kasyapa Samhitha Part- II, 1st Edition (2002), S.Godage Publishers, Colombo, Sri Lanka.
- Amarasinghe, A.P.G., Kaumarabhrithya Samgraha (Text book of Ayurveda Paediatrics) 1st Edition- 2nd print (2009), S. Godage Publishers, Colombo, Sri Lanka.
