= Abdul Ahmed Ningi =

Nigerian politician (born 1960)

Deputy Majority Leader of the Nigerian Senate

Member of the U.S. House of Representatives from Bauchi's Bauchi Central senatorial zone district
- In office 7 June 2011 – 9 June 2015
- President: Goodluck Ebele Jonathan
- Preceded by: Mohammed A. Muhammed
- Succeeded by: Isah Hamma Misau

Member of the House of Representatives of Nigeria

Member of the U.S. House of Representatives from Bauchi
- In office 8 June 1999 – 6 June 2011
- Preceded by: Newly created
- Succeeded by: Abdulrazaq Zaki
- Constituency: Ningi/Warji Federal constituency

Chairman of the House Committee on Police Affairs
- In office 12 June 2007 – 6 June 2011

House Majority Leader
- In office 10 June 2003 – 11 June 2007

Chairman of the House Committee on Solid Minerals
- In office 11 June 2002 – 9 June 2003

Personal details
- Born: Abdul Ahmed Ningi; 20 April 1960 (age 66) Ningi, Bauchi, Nigeria.
- Party: People's Democratic Party (PDP)
- Education: Ahmadu Bello University (BSc.)
- Profession: Civil Servant
- Website: AbdulNingi.com

Abdul Ahmed Ningi (born April 20, 1960) was a Deputy Majority Leader of the Nigerian Senate. A member of People's Democratic Party (PDP), he served as a Senator representing Bauchi central senatorial district from 2011 to 2015. Bauchi Central senatorial zone includes the local government areas of Danbam, Darazo, Ganjuwa, Misau, Ningi, and Warji.

Abdul Ningi served as the House Majority Leader of the Nigerian House of Representatives from 2003 to 2007 and has been a member of the House of Representatives from 1999 to 2011. As Deputy Majority Leader, Abdul Ningi was a principal officer of the Nigerian Senate.

== Early years ==
Abdul Ningi was born in Ningi town of Bauchi state. He grew up in modest circumstances having to work tens of kilometres daily to fetch water for the family. He started working at his fathers farm at age 5, a farm he still maintains till today. He has lived in Ningi his entire life.

He attended Ningi East primary school (1969 to 1973) and Government Secondary School, Misau. Graduating from Government Secondary School, Misau in 1978, he enrolled at the Bauchi College of Art and Sciences for a 2-year pre-degree program. He earned his B.Sc. in Sociology from Ahmadu Bello University in 1983, becoming the first in his family to attend university.

Shortly after his graduation in 1983, he proceeded on his National Youth Service in Kano. In 1984, he accepted a position in Bauchi state government as a Social welfare officer. He was later promoted to the Secretary of Bauchi Rent Tribunal and by 1986 he was head hunted into First Bank of Nigeria as a banking supervisor. He joined Hi-Tech computers in 1992 as a Senior Administrative officer and by 1995 became the chairman and Chief Executive of NAJ Resources Ltd., Bauchi.

== Early political career ==
In 1996, Abdul Ningi contested for the Bauchi state assembly under the platform of the United Nigeria Congress Party (UNCP) won but the Abacha led government cancelled the election.

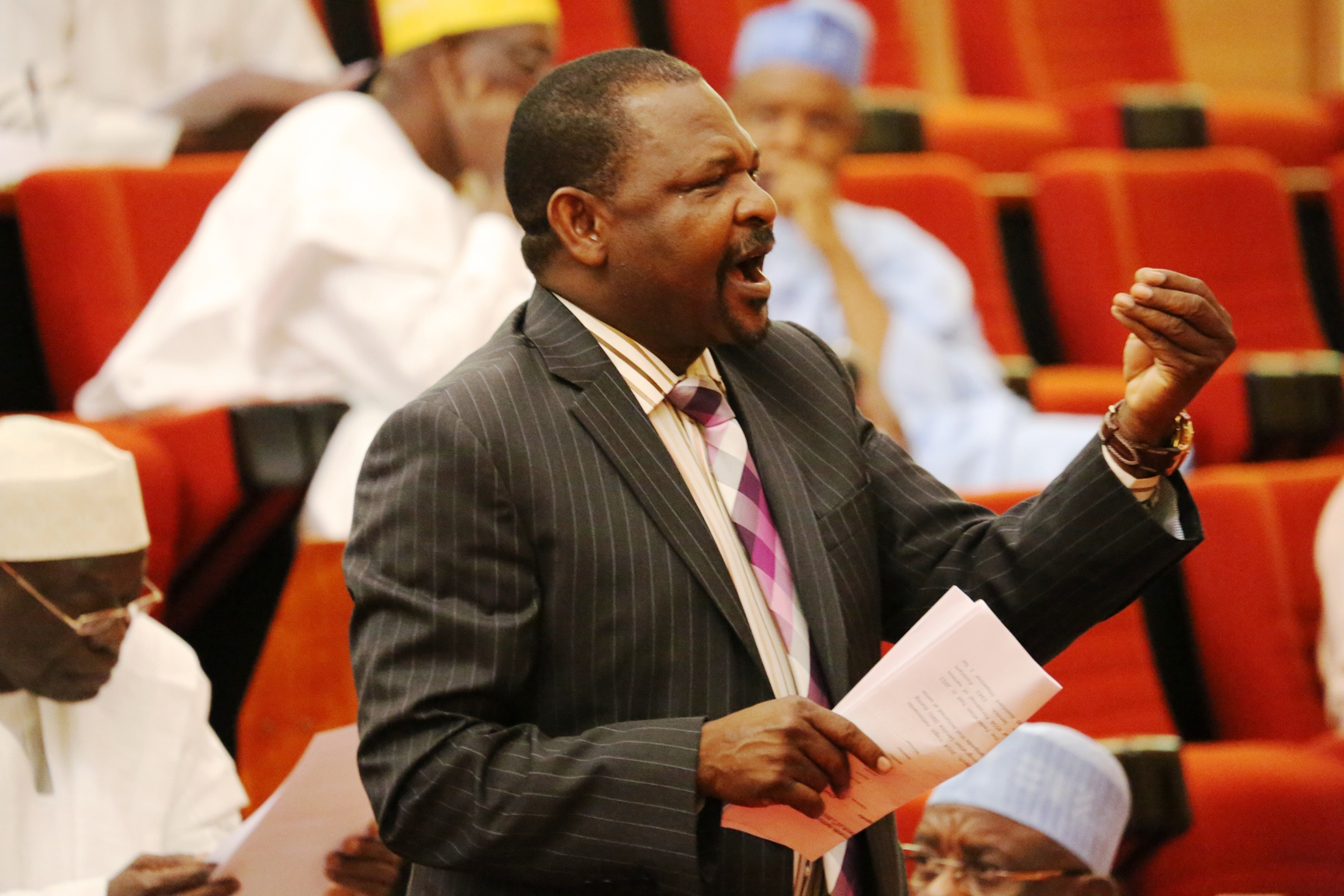
Sen. Abdul Ningi at Senate plenary in 2013

== House of Representatives ==
With the return to civilian rule in 1999, Abdul Ningi contested under the platform of the People's Democratic Party and won by a landslide to represent Ningi Federal constituency. He was re-elected 2 times in 2003 and 2007.

=== 1999 to 2003 ===
During his first term as a member of the Nigerian House of Representatives, Abdul Ningi served as Chairman House Committee on Solid minerals (2002 to 2003); chairman, House sub-committee on Teachers Education (1999 to 2002); and chairman, House sub-committee on NAFDAC (1999 - 2003). Between 1999 and 2002, he was Chairman of the Nigeria Football Association during his reign, Nigeria qualified for her second appearance at the FIFA World Cup.

=== 2003 to 2007 ===
Abdul Ningi was re-elected in 2003. From 2003 to 2007, he served as the House Majority Leader. He was among the key actors that helped in keeping the house together during the Third Term Agenda in 2006. He chaired the House sub-committee on Nigeria Football Association (2003 to 2007) and became a member of Inter Parliamentary Union, Commonwealth Parliamentary Association and Pan-African Parliament.

=== 2007 to 2011 ===
His 2007 election was keenly contested as Salisu Zakari of the All Nigerian Peoples Party (ANPP) was initially declared the winner, but in 2008 the appeal court reinstated Abdul Ningi as the rightful winner of the April 2007 elections. He served as Chairman Ad-hoc committee on Niger delta crisis, were his input helped in developing the Amnesty program that resolved the Niger Delta militancy. He was also the Chairman House Committee on Police Affairs and was a member of the House Committee on Jos crisis and Constitutional Review Committee.

== Deputy Majority Leader ==
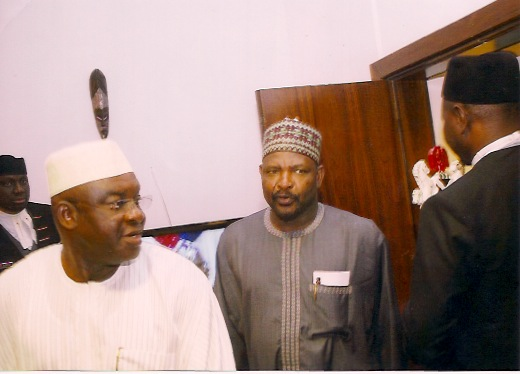
Abdul Ningi and Senate President, David Mark in 2012

In 2011, Abdul Ningi ran against incumbent Senator Mohammed A. Muhammed of the All Nigerian Peoples Party (ANPP), who was under scrutiny for lack of quality representation by his constituency. Abdul Ningi trounced Mohammed A. Muhammed in the 9 April senatorial elections . With the Peoples Democratic Party maintaining their majority in the Senate with a total seat of 64 out of 108 seats, Abdul Ningi was unanimously chosen by his colleagues as the deputy majority leader.

== Constituency projects ==
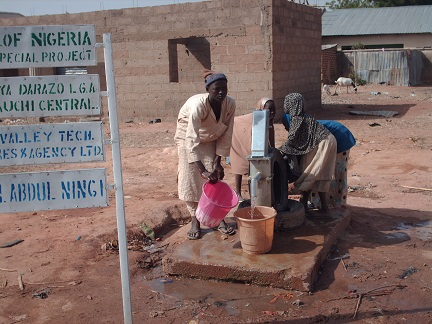
An Abdul Ningi funded borehole for Gidan Waya community in Darazo lga, Bauchi in 2012

With Bauchi being a predominantly agricultural community in need of development, Abdul Ningi fashioned out a "Masterplan of Service" development blueprint focusing on Jobs creation, Farming support and Community development.

=== Job creation ===
He initiated a massive sensitization of unemployed graduates in Bauchi in taking advantage of the Graduate Internship Scheme. Within two months, he was able to facilitate and secure the registration and enrollment of over 1,000 graduates across the 20 local government areas of Bauchi. In partnership with SURE-P, over 3,000 Bauchi youths were engaged in Community Services Women and Youth Employment (CSWYE). As at October 2014, he is working with FERMA to facilitate the employment of over 1,000 Bauchi youths into the program ‘Public works for Youth’.

=== Farming support ===
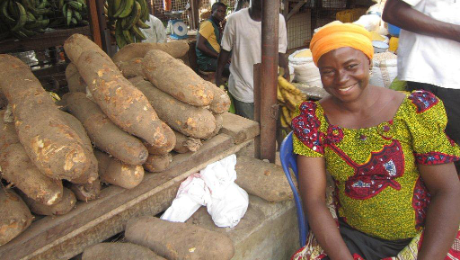
A beneficiary of Abdul Ningi farming support smiles.

In partnership with the Hadejia-Jama’are River Basin Development Agriculture and Upper Benue River Basin Development Authority, Abdul Ningi assisted 1,850 individual farms with Dry season support and 600 individual farms with Wet season support during the 2012 and 2013 farming season.

=== Community development ===
Between 2012 and 2013, Abdul Ningi sank a total of 659 units of hand pump boreholes, 43 Solar powered overhead tanks for the six local government areas of Danbam, Darazo, Ganjuwa, Ningi and Warji. He also initiated the ‘Ningi water reticulation project’ which when completed will provide water for over 100,000 inhabitants of the Ningi emirate and surrounding villages boost agriculture and power generation capacity of the state. Feasibility studies, mechanical and architectural designs are being completed for implementation early 2015.

=== Poverty eradication ===
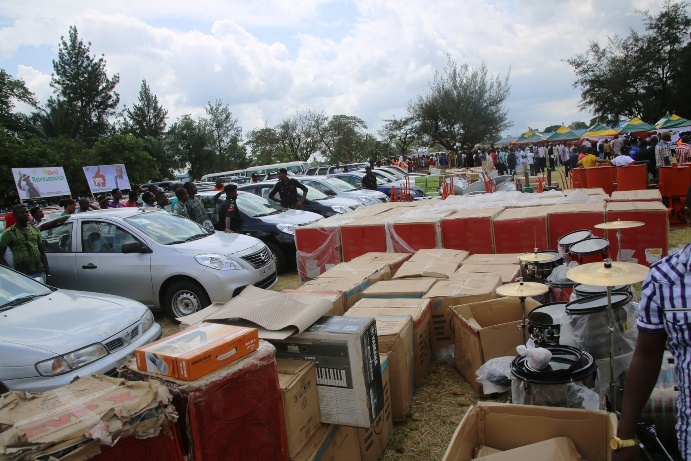
Donation of Sewing machines, motorcycles, etc. to Bauchi people.

With a drive to eradicate poverty from Bauchi state, Abdul Ningi donated 1,500 motorcycles, 600 tricycles, and 500 sewing machines to various communities. To aid transportation, numerous 18-seater buses were also donated.

=== Skill Acquisition Centers ===
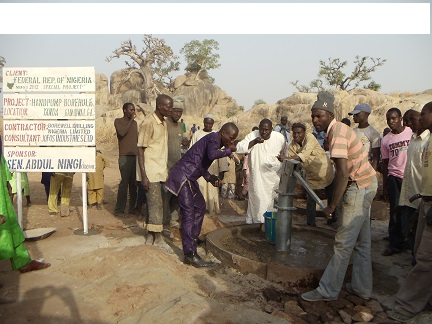
An Abdul Ningi funded borehole for Yanda community in Ganjuwa lga, Bauchi

Two mega Youth Skill Acquisition Centers in Ningi and Misau and in partnership with SMEDAN, Abdul Ningi trained over 1,200 youths in tailoring, 250 youths in basket weaver and hundreds more in craftsmanship. 9 ICT centers were constructed to extend computer literacy to Bauchi people. To enable proper utilization of these skill acquisition centers, Abdul Ningi is continually working in partnership with Secondary schools, local governments and other stakeholders.

=== Education ===
For the 2013/2014 academic session, 500 primary schools have been enlisted for intervention with equipment for provision of modern white board and markers, modernized classroom tables and seats, and provision of text and writing books. Through the Ningi scholarship scheme, hundreds of youths get their WASSCE fees and tuition fees paid by Abdul Ningi.

S/N	Project	Result
1	Job creation	1,000 Graduate (GIS) jobs
1	Job creation	500 Public work youth jobs
1	Job creation	3,000 jobs through Community Services Women and Youth Employment (CSWYE) program
2	Poverty eradication	1,500 Motorcycles donated
2	Poverty eradication	600 Tricycles donated
2	Poverty eradication	5,000 Sewing machines donated
3	Road construction	Rehabilitation of "Ningi-Yadangungume-Fuskar-Mata" Road
4	Farming support	1,850 farms Dry season support
4	Farming support	600 farms Wet season farming support
5	Community development	
5	Community development	659 units hand pump constructed
5	Community development	43 Solar powered Borehole
5	Community development	20units - 500KVA Transformer
5	Community development	1,240 Solar Street lights
6	Education	1,000 WASSCE fee paid between 2012 and 2013.
6	Education	53 Tertiary education scholarship beneficiaries
6	Education	250 Adult education beneficiaries
6	Education	500 primary schools provided with Tables, Chairs, Exercise books, and Writing materials
7	Skill Acquisition centers	9 ICT centers
7	Skill Acquisition centers	1,200 Tailors trained
7	Skill Acquisition centers	250 Basket weavers trained
7	Skill Acquisition centers	80 IT Professionals trained
8	Hospitals	5 Ambulances donated
8	Hospitals	40 Baby incubators donated
8	Hospitals	100 Beds and beddings
9	Transport	18 seater buses donated

== Personal life ==
Abdul Ningi and his wife were married in 1982, and live in Ningi, Bauchi. They have five children.

== Crisis with the Senate ==
Senator Ningi was suspended from the senate after he brought public attention to the issue of budget padding rocking the House. He resigned as the chairman of the Northern Senators Forum over the same issue.
