= Adamu Gumba =

Nigerian politician

Senator of the Federal Republic of Nigeria from Bauchi State South District
- Incumbent
- Assumed office 23 August 2010
- Preceded by: Bala Mohammed
- Succeeded by: Malam Wakili
- Constituency: Bauchi South

Personal details
- Born: 10 October 1948 (age 77)
- Party: Peoples Democratic Party (PDP)
- Profession: Politician

Ibrahim Adamu Gumba (born 10 October 1948) is a Nigerian politician who was elected senator for the Bauchi South constituency of Bauchi State, Nigeria, in the April 2011 national elections. He ran on the Peoples Democratic Party (PDP) ticket.

Gumba was born on 10 October 1948. He obtained a BSc in government. He worked in the Nigeria Customs Service, where he rose to the position of deputy comptroller general. Gumba became head of the Bauchi State civil service. In 2006, he was appointed the commissioner of education in Bauchi State.

The Bauchi South senatorial seat became vacant in May 2010 after Senator Bala Muhammed was appointed Minister of the Federal Capital Territory (FCT) by President Goodluck Jonathan. In the 23 August 2010 bye-election for the Bauchi South senate seat, Gumba received 273,764 votes, while Ibrahim Haruna of the All Nigeria Peoples Party (ANPP) trailed with 57,661 votes, and Danjuma Dabo of the Congress for Progressive Change (CPC) received 56,294 votes.

In the PDP primaries for the April 2011 election for the Bauchi South senatorial seat, Gumba gained the nomination at the expense of former Senator Abubakar Maikafi and one-time Independent National Electoral Commission (INEC) national commissioner, Mohammed Abubakar. In the elections, Gumba scored 312,627 votes, while Alhaji Mohammed Ibrahim of the All Nigeria Peoples Party (ANPP) scored 114,281 votes. Senator Malam Wakili succeeded Gumba in the Senate after defeating Isa Yuguda in the general elections of March 2015.
