= Babalola Borishade =

Nigerian politician

Abraham Babalola Borishade
- Born: 7 March 1946; Usi Ekiti
- Died: 26 April 2017 (aged 71); London
- Education: University of Ife
- Occupations: Electrical engineer Teacher; Politician
- Spouse: Ireti Olubunmi Borishade
- Awards: National Honour of Commander of the Order of the Federal Republic CFR Baba Isale of St Andrew Anglican cathedral of Ekiti Oke Diocese of Anglican communion at Usi Ekiti

Abraham Babalola Borishade (7 March 1946 – 26 April 2017) was a Nigerian politician. He was a four time Federal Minister in Nigeria, between 1999-2011. He was known as an electrical engineer, teacher and political strategist.

== Early life ==
Borishade attended St. Andrews Primary School, Usi Ekiti, and Doherty Memorial Grammar School, Ijero Ekiti. In 1971, he graduated from the University of Ife, with First Class Honors in electrical engineering. After graduation, he was hired as a graduate assistant there. In 1972, he earned a Commonwealth Scholarship for a doctorate degree in high-voltage engineering at Victoria University. He obtained his PhD in 1975, and returned to Obafemi Awolowo University (OAU), where he launched the Electrical Power Systems degree program and the University of Ife Consultancy Unit, both in the Faculty of Technology.

== Career ==
In 1975, Borishade was selected to train at the Nuclear and Power Engineering Station at Texas A&M University. He obtained a certificate in Nuclear Power Development. He underwent further training in the International Atomic Energy Agency, Vienna in 1982.

Borishade was a registered engineer and a member of the Institute of Electrical Engineers, United Kingdom.

He was a member of the Nigerian Society of Engineers, American Nuclear Society, and the Science Association of Nigeria. He became an Associate Professor of Electrical Engineering at OAU in 1985. He served as a member of the Technical Advisory Committee of the Regional Centre for Training in Aerospace Survey. He was a representative of the congregation at the University Senate, and also Chairman of Project Advisory Committee and University Works and Maintenance Service Monitoring Committee.

== Public service ==
In 1988 Borishade was elected as a Member of the Constituent Assembly to review the 1979 Constitution . He advocated for the creation of the Nigeria Energy Commission and the Environmental Protection Commission that later created the Federal Environmental Protection Agency (FEPA), a precursor to the present Ministry of Environment.

Borishade supported General Shehu Musa Yar’adua's efforts towards crafting bridges of understanding among the country's ethnic nationalities as a prerequisite for development. He joined the Yar'adua's movement called "the Peoples Front" together with other politicians such as Atiku Abubakar, Abdullahi Aliyu Sumaila, Abubakar Koko, Dapo Sarumi, Yomi Edu, Bola Tinubu, Professor Ango Abdullahi, Sabo Bakin Zuwo and Rabiu Kwankwaso. This later birthed the Peoples Democratic Movement (PDM), a political association that has remained dominant in Nigerian politics. The PDM struggled to restore democracy to Nigeria and became a principal partner in the formation of the Social Democratic Party (SDP) created by the Babangida Military Administration.

Borishade served as director of research and planning for the defunct SDP; Coordinator (Administration) of M.K.O Abiola's campaign; director of administration, strategy, and planning for the Obasanjo Campaign Organization in 1999; and coordinator of the Election Administration and Management Unit of the Obasanjo/Atiku Campaign Organization in 2003. Borishade was appointed senior special assistant to President Obasanjo in May 1999, initiating and convening the first Youth Forum in Abuja. He chaired the preparation of the National Youth Policy and the blueprint of the National Poverty Eradication Programme (NAPEP). Between February 2001 and May 2003, he served as Minister of Education.

In recognition of his contributions to education in Nigeria, Africa and the world at large, Borishade was elected the vice-chairman of the E9 Group of the United Nations, President of the UNESCO International Conference on Education, as well as Chairman Education for All (EFA) Forum of African Ministers of Education. In 2004, Borishade was appointed Honourable Minister of State, Power and Steel. He initiated the 'Gas to Power Project (G2P)' a World Bank sponsored project designed to ensure sustained gas development and availability for power production to meet Nigerian electricity demands.

Between July 2005 and November 2006, Borishade was Minister of Aviation, during which a Civil Aviation Bill was passed to replace the 1964 Act, and the direct flight between Nigeria and the United States of America was restored. His initiation of various reforms and development in the aviation sector resulted in Nigeria scoring 93% in the ICAO Universal Audit which made Nigeria a benchmark for the African aviation industry.

In November 2006, he was assigned to the Federal Ministry of Culture and Tourism as a Minister, a position he held till May 2007 at the expiration of Obasanjo and Abubakar's tenure.

== Recognition ==
- National Honour of Commander of the Order of the Federal Republic, CFR
- Baba Isale of St Andrew Anglican cathedral of Ekiti Oke Diocese of Anglican communion at Usi Ekiti

== Personal life ==
He married Ireti Olubunmi Borishade and had children.

== Death ==
Prof Babalola Borishade died on 26 April 2017 in London after a brief illness. He was 71 years old.
