= Auwal Jatau =

Nigerian politician

His Excellency Auwal Jatau

Deputy Governor of Bauchi State
- Incumbent
- Assumed office 29 May 2023
- Governor: Bala Mohammed
- Preceded by: Baba Tela

Member House of Representatives for Zaki federal constituency
- In office 2020 – 29 May 2023

Commissioner for Health
- In office 2019–2020

Personal details
- Born: Mohammed Auwal Jatau; 1 January 1968 (age 58)
- Party: Allied Peoples Movement

Mohammed Auwal Jatau (born 1 January 1968) is a Nigerian politician, who is deputy governor of Bauchi State since 29 May 2023. Jatau was elected in the 2023 Bauchi State gubernatorial election. He previously served as a member of the House of Representatives representing Zaki federal constituency and the commissioner for health.

== Early life and education ==
Jatau was born on 1 January 1968 in Zaki, Bauchi State, Nigeria. He attended Government Teachers College, Sakwa, and later studied nursing and education. He obtained a Diploma in Nursing Education from The Polytechnic, Calabar, and a Bachelor of Education Health from the University of Nigeria, Nsukka. He also earned a master's degree in International Relations and Diplomacy from Baze University, Abuja.

== Political career ==
Jatau is a Nigerian politician and member of the People's Democratic Party (PDP). He represented the Zaki Federal Constituency of Bauchi State in the House of Representatives of Nigeria from 2020 to 2023. Before joining the House of Representatives, he served as Commissioner for Health in Bauchi State from 2019 to 2020. In 2023, Jatau was elected Deputy Governor of Bauchi State alongside Governor Bala Mohammed in the Bauchi State governorship election. He assumed office on 29 May 2023.
