= Baba Tela =

Nigerian politician

His Excellency Baba Tela

Deputy Governor of Bauchi State
- In office 29 May 2019 – 29 May 2023
- Governor: Bala Mohammed
- Preceded by: Sule Katagum
- Succeeded by: Auwal Jatau

Senator of the Federal Republic of Nigeria from Bauchi State
- In office 2003–2007

Baba Tela is the former deputy governor of Bauchi State, succeeded by Hon. Auwal Jatau . He is a former member of the Senate of the National Assembly of Nigeria. He is also a former chairman of Nigerian Maritime Administration and Safety Agency, NIMASA. He is a non-executive independent director of Zenith Bank plc, He is the chairman of the finance and general purpose committee of the bank; member of board credit committee of the bank and member of the board of directors of Zenith Bank Gambia.

== Political career ==
He was a senator of the Federal Republic of Nigeria between 2002 and 2003, and was further re-elected for a second tenure from 2003 to 2007. At the Senate, he was the chairman of the Senate Committee on Communications, served on several other committees, including Water Resources; Cooperation and Integration in Africa and NEPAD and Committee on Special Duties. He also served as a member of the governing council of the Federal University of Technology, Minna, and director, Coates Brothers (W.A.) Limited, among others.

In 2011, Tela contested for the governor of Bauchi State under the defunct ACN.

He commenced his working career as a financial analyst with Masenterp Nigeria Ltd. In late 1983, and worked in various capacities and organizations until he became special assistant to the president on economy in 2001, a position he held until his election as senator in 2002.

== Education ==
Alhaji Tela obtained a Bachelor of Science degree in Business Administration from the Ahmadu Bello University, Zaria in 1982.

He had attended various courses and seminars on banking, finance and administration. In December 2013, Senator Baba Tela Tela formally returned to his former party, the PDP.

== Personal life ==
Tela, a Muslim, is married and the father of twelve children.
