= Global University Bangladesh =

Private university in Barisal, Bangladesh

Coordinates: 22.7131°N 90.3489°E

- গ্লোবাল ইউনিভার্সিটি বাংলাদেশ
- Other names: GUB
- Motto: Success Begins Here
- Type: Private
- Established: 2015; 11 years ago
- Affiliations: University Grants Commission Bangladesh
- Chancellor: President Mohammed Shahabuddin
- Vice-Chancellor: Anisuzzaman
- Location: BN Tower, Sher-E-Bangla Sharak, Natullahbad, Barisal, Bangladesh
- Campus: Urban
- Language: English
- Website: globaluniversity.edu.bd

Global University Bangladesh (GUB) (Bengali: গ্লোবাল ইউনিভার্সিটি বাংলাদেশ) is a private university located at Barisal, a city in south-central Bangladesh. The University Grants Commission of Bangladesh approved it in 2013 and it was established in 2015 under the Private University Act 2010. It is the first private university in Barisal Division.

== History ==
Global University Bangladesh was established in 2015. Three members of its board of trustees, including the chair, were relatives of then ruling party MP Jahangir Kabir Nanak. As of late 2016, the university's top three administrative positions were still vacant. Not until May 2019 was the vice chancellorship filled, by professor of philosophy Anisuzzaman. At that time enrollment was approximately 1,300. Land had been purchased for a permanent campus, but it was still operating out of a rented six-story building. As of February 2021, it has no permanent professors on the faculty.

It is accredited by the University Grants Commission (UGC) and approved by the Ministry of Education, Government of Bangladesh.

== Academic programs ==
=== Faculty of Science and Engineering ===
Departments

- Electrical and electronic engineering
- Computer Science and Engineering

Undergraduate programs:

- B.Sc. in Electrical & Electronic Engineering (4 years )
- B.Sc. in Electrical & Electronic Engineering (Evening for Diploma holders - 44 months )
- B.Sc. in Computer Science & Engineering (4 years)
- B.Sc. in Computer Science & Engineering (Evening for Diploma holders - 44 months )

=== Faculty of Business Administration ===
Department

- Bachelor of Business Administration (BBA) (4 Years)
- Executive Master of Business Administration (EMBA) (1.5 Years)
- Master of Business Administration (MBA) ( 1 Year )

=== Faculty of Law ===
Department

- Law

Undergraduate programs:

- Bachelor of Laws [LL. B. (Hons.)]

Postgraduate programs:

- Master of Laws - BBB (For LLB Hons. 1 year)
- Master of Laws - LLM (For LLB Hons. 2 years)

=== Faculty of Arts and Social Science ===
Departments

- English
- Library and Information Science

Undergraduate programs:

- Bachelor of Arts in English (Hons.)

Postgraduate programs:

- MA in English
- Diploma in Library and Information Science, (1 Year)

== See also ==
- University of Barisal
