= Mohammed A. Muhammed =

Nigerian politician

Mohammed A Muhammed

Senator of the Federal Republic of Nigeria from Bauchi State Central District
- Incumbent
- Assumed office 2007
- Constituency: Bauchi Central

Personal details
- Born: 27 December 1939 (age 86)
- Party: All Nigeria Peoples Party (ANPP)
- Spouse: Zainab Adamu Bulkachuwa
- Profession: Accountant, politician

Mohammed A Muhammed (born 27 December 1939) is a Nigerian politician, who served as a member of the Senate for Bauchi State. He is married to Justice Zainab Adamu Bulkachuwa, President of the court of Appeal, Abuja.

== Background ==
Mohammed A Muhammed was born on 27 December 1939. He obtained a Diploma in Accountancy in 1964, and qualified as a Certified Accountant U.K in 1967. He was Chief Accountant at Northern State Marketing Board 1970–1976, and Assistant General Manager and Executive Director Union Bank Plc 1980–1990.

== Senator ==
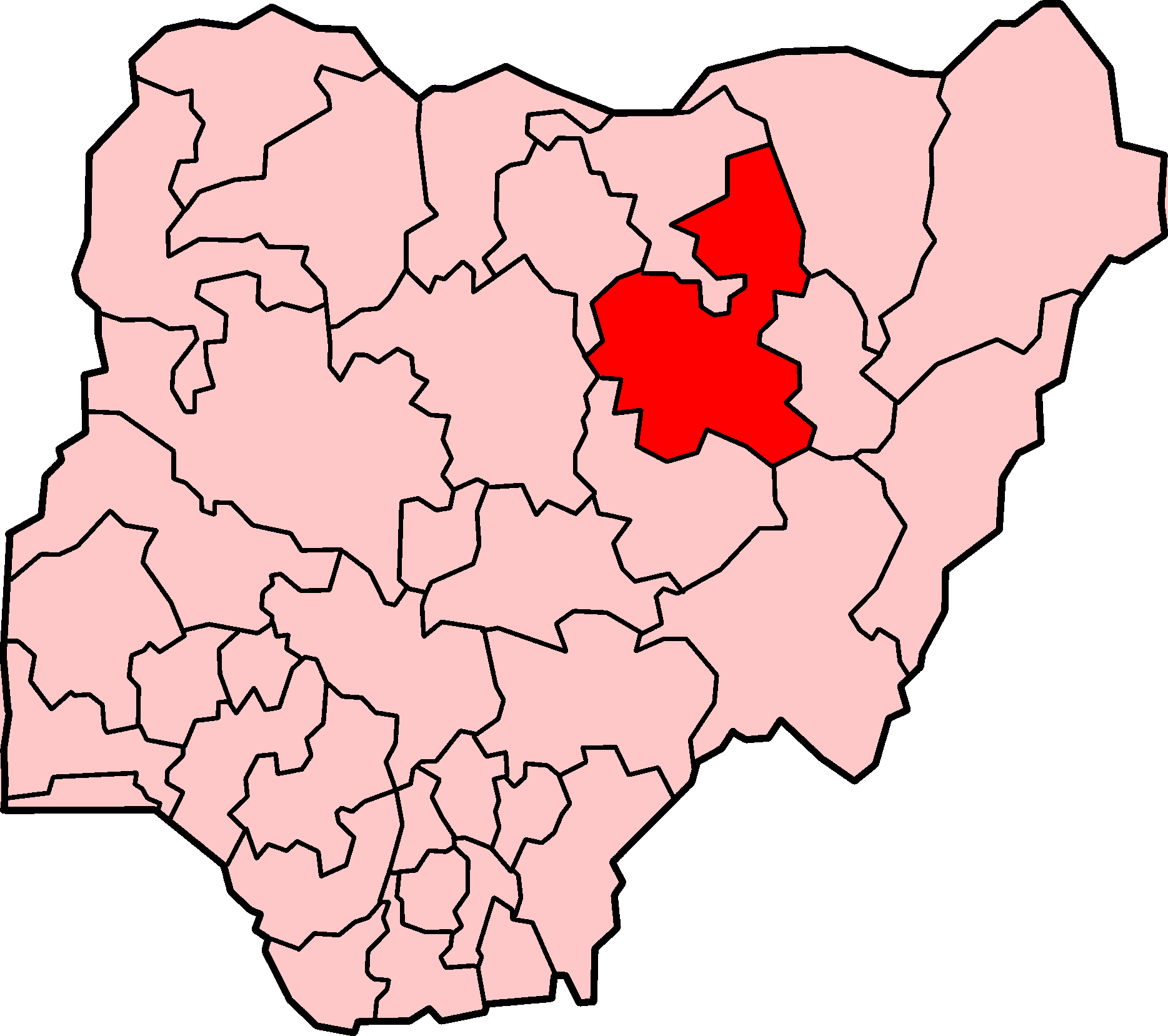
Bauchi State, Nigeria

In April 2007, he ran for the Senate as a member of the All Nigeria Peoples Party (ANPP) and was elected for the Bauchi Central constituency. He was appointed to committees on Integration and Cooperation, Finance (vice-chairman), Ethics & Petition, Banking, Insurance & Other Financial Institutions.

In January 2008, he was a member of the Senate Committee on Ethics and Privileges that was charged with investigating Senator Nuhu Aliyu's allegations about fraudsters in the National Assembly.

In a February 2009 interview, he expressed support for creation of new states in Nigeria and criticised the Independent National Electoral Commission (INEC). He was among a group of senators who reportedly travelled to Ghana in May 2009 to attend a meeting with some oil companies, which resulted in a senate investigation. He supported a bill proposed by President Umaru Musa Yar'Adua seeking to give more powers to the Nigeria Police during elections, which was rejected by the Senate.

In his first two years in the Senate, he failed to initiate any bills.
