= Bala Mohammed =

Nigerian politician (born 1958)

His Excellency Bala Mohammed CON

Governor of Bauchi State
- Incumbent
- Assumed office 29 May 2019
- Deputy: Baba Tela; Auwal Jatau
- Preceded by: Mohammed Abdullahi Abubakar

Minister of Federal Capital Territory
- In office 8 April 2010 – 28 May 2015
- President: Goodluck Jonathan
- Preceded by: Adamu Aliero
- Succeeded by: Mohammed Musa Bello

Senator for Bauchi South
- In office 5 June 2007 – 8 April 2010
- Preceded by: Abubakar Maikafi
- Succeeded by: Adamu Gumba

Personal details
- Born: 5 October 1958 (age 68) Alkaleri, Northern Region, British Nigeria
- Party: Allied Peoples Movement
- Education: University of Maiduguri
- Occupation: Politician

Bala Abdulkadir Mohammed CON (born 5 October 1958) is a Nigerian politician who has served as governor of Bauchi State since 2019. A member of the Allied Peoples Movement, he was the former minister of the Federal Capital Territory (FCT) from 2010 to 2015, and senator representing Bauchi South senatorial district from 2007 to 2010.

== Education and career ==
Mohammed attended Duguri primary school in Bauchi from 1965 to 1971. From 1972 to 1976, he had his secondary education at Government School Bauchi. He obtained his advanced level testimonial in 1979 from North East College of Art and Science and his Bachelor of Arts degree from the University of Maiduguri. In 1988, Mohammed completed a management course at the Administrative Staff College of Nigeria (ASCON), and in 1997, he earned a certificate from the Institute of Purchase and Supplies.

Mohammed began his career as a journalist in 1982 and served as a news editor of the Mirage newspaper, as a news reporter with the News Agency of Nigeria (NAN), and as a state editor in charge of Benue at the Democrat newspaper from 1983 to 1984.

He made a career switch to the civil service as an administrative officer at the Federal Ministry of Internal Affairs, where he served until 1994. He then moved to the presidency (cabinet secretariat) as the principal administrative officer. Mohammed's rise through the civil service ranks was rapid. Between 1995 and 2005, he advanced from chief supplies officer at the Federal Ministry of Solid Minerals to assistant director at the Federal Ministry of Power and Steel, deputy director/special assistant to the Honourable Minister at the Federal Ministry of Transport, director of administration at the Nigerian Railway Corporation, special assistant to the Honourable Minister of Aviation, and director of administration and supplies at the Nigerian Meteorological Agency. He voluntarily retired from the civil service at the rank of director and subsequently ventured into politics.

== Politics ==
He reportedly fell out with political godfather Governor Isa Yuguda after Yuguda married President Umaru Yar'Adua's daughter and decamped to the Peoples Democratic Party (PDP). Following the death of Umaru Yar'Adua, Mohammed joined the Peoples Democratic Party (PDP) and became a close associate of President Goodluck Jonathan.

=== Senator ===
In 2007, Mohammed contested and won the election to serve the people of Bauchi South Senatorial zone as a senator under the party platform of the All Nigeria Peoples Party (ANPP) from 2007 to 2010. While at the senate chamber, he became one of the foremost outspoken legislators in Nigeria. Mohammed sat as member of eight committees – he was the vice chairman Senate Committee on Aviation, secretary, Northern Senator's Forum. The committees included communication, finance, public account, rules and business, environment, labour and productivity.

On 10 February 2010, Mohammed supported the "doctrine of necessity" in the senate that led to the emergence of Vice President Goodluck Jonathan as the acting president. Mohammed's actions paved the way for Goodluck Jonathan, from the Niger Delta, to break the glass ceiling of Nigeria's tripodal political monopoly.

=== Minister of the federal capital territory ===
On 6 April 2010, Mohammed became the Minister of the Federal Capital Territory (FCT). He left the ANPP for the PDP shortly after. While at the FCT, he brought extensive reforms. Among the reforms were the sanitisation of the land administration of the FCT, comprehensive expansion of the major road access Nnamdi Azikiwe Airport road to the international airport in Abuja, the construction of the Kubwa expressway, the rail track from Abuja to Kaduna, and the Idu rail station. He also introduced the land swap policy, where land was used as a resource to fast-track infrastructural development in the FCT.

The FCT administration under Mohammed oversaw the installation of solar panel traffic lights. Other projects executed include the development of satellite towns and the completion of the Usama dam water project. Also, his administration instituted innovations that served as the bedrock of financial stability and employment opportunities, such as the FCT Internal Revenue Board, the Outdoor Advertising (Signage) Agency and the FCTA Emergency Services.

Following Mohammed's exit as Minister of the FCT in May 2015 and the entry of a new ruling party at the Presidential Villa in Aso Rock, Abuja, antigraft agencies began a clampdown on the former minister. In October 2016, the Economic and Financial Crimes Commission (EFCC) arrested Mohammed and detained him for 49 days. An Abuja High Court sitting in Maitama declared the detention illegal and unconstitutional, ordering the EFCC to pay the sum of N5 million as compensation. Mohammed stated that his ordeal was "a clear case of witch-hunt attributable to the role he played in the execution of the doctrine of necessity," aimed at tarnishing his image and hard-earned reputation.

== Governor of Bauchi State ==
On 29 May 2019, Mohammed was sworn in as the governor of Bauchi State under the banner of the PDP, after defeating the incumbent governor, Mohammed Abdullahi Abubakar, with 515,313 votes to 500,625 votes. The victory was later upheld by the Supreme Court on 20 January 2020.

== Achievements ==
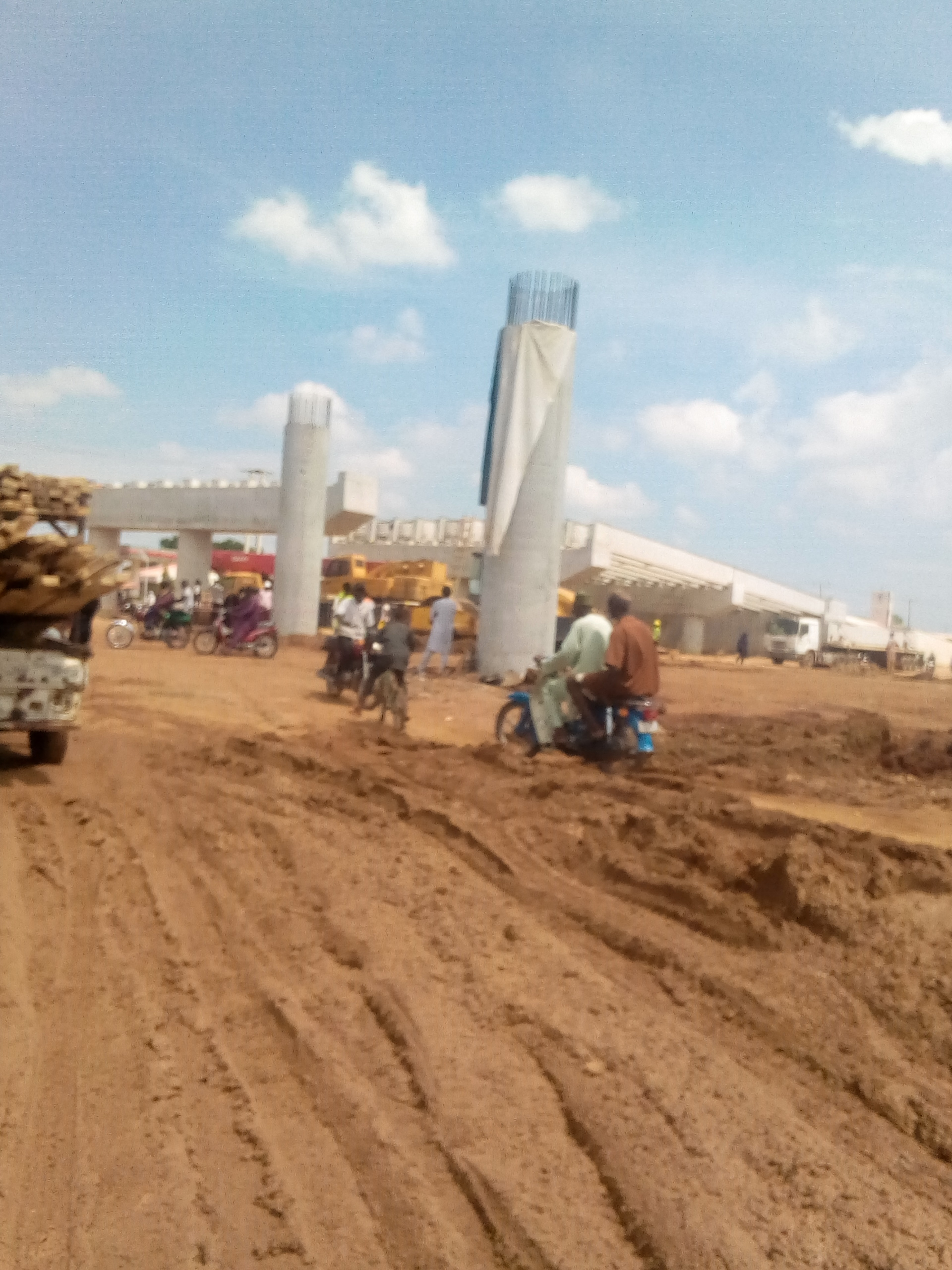
Flyover in Bauchi under construction

Begin in 2024, the first flyover to be constructed in Bauchi State is under construction

After his swearing-in, Mohammed sought to streamline government processes and protocols, as well as recover lost or stolen government properties and funds. He also launched an initiative to rid the Bauchi State civil service of ghost workers. He set up a committee tasked with probing and recovering looted funds from the past administration. Additionally, a committee was established to authenticate the Bank Verification Numbers (BVN) of civil servants, which uncovered ghost workers on the payroll.

Mohammed was determined to improve the education and health sectors in the state, addressing the burden of over 1.3 million out-of-school children and non-functional hospitals. The administration initiated policies and programmes and signed memoranda of understanding with local and international partners, significantly impacting the state's primary healthcare system. The administration also renovated schools to encourage higher school enrolments.

The government launched the Kaura Economic Empowerment Programme (KEEP), targeting women and youths with grants, loans, motorcycles, grinding machines, sewing machines, and buses, among other resources.

The government sought investments from NEXIM Bank and agricultural companies to scale up commercial farming in the state.

Mohammed flagged off the construction of 2,500 affordable houses in Dungal village, located in the Bauchi local government area. The government also constructed connecting roads within the state.

== See also ==
- List of governors of Bauchi State
